= List of Māori plant common names =

This is a list of Māori plant common names. In some cases, a Māori name may apply to two or more species, either similar visually or in terms of traditional use.

== A–H ==
Māori name	Alternative name(s)	Scientific name	Image	Notes
Akakura	Carmine rātā	Metrosideros carminea		
Akatea	White rātā	Metrosideros albiflora Metrosideros perforata		
Akeake	Tree daisy Broadleaf hopbush	Dodonaea viscosa Olearia avicenniifolia Olearia traversiorum		
Aruhe	Bracken	Pteridium esculentum		
Harakeke	New Zealand flax	Phormium tenax		
Heketara		Olearia rani Lepidium oleraceum		
Heruheru	Single crape fern Prince of Wales feathers	Leptopteris hymenophylloides Leptopteris superba		The image is of L. superba.
Hīnau	New Zealand privet	Elaeocarpus dentatus Geniostoma ligustrifolium		Also known in Māori as hangehange.
Horoeka	Lancewood	Pseudopanax crassifolius		
Horokaka	Ice plant	Disphyma australe		
Horopito		Pseudowintera sp.		
Houhere	Lacebark	Hoheria sp.		
Houpara		Pseudopanax lessonii		
Huruhuruwhenua	Shining spleenwort	Asplenium oblongifolium		
Hutu		Ascarina lucida		

== K–M ==
Māori name	Alternative name(s)	Scientific name	Image	Notes
Kahakaha	Bush lily Bush flax Widow maker	Astelia fragrans Astelia hastata		
Kahikatea	White pine	Dacrycarpus dacrydioides		
Kaikawaka	New Zealand cedar	Libocedrus bidwillii		Also known in Māori as pāhautea
Kaikōmako		Pennantia corymbosa		
Kāmahi		Pterophylla racemosa		
Kānuka	White tea-tree	Kunzea ericoides		
Kāpuka	New Zealand broadleaf	Griselinia littoralis		Also called pāpāuma in Māori.
Karaka	New Zealand laurel	Corynocarpus laevigatus		
Karamū		Coprosma robusta		The name karamū is also used as part of the name of Coprosma lucida (Shining karamū) and Coprosma macrocarpa (Coastal karamū).
Kareao	Supplejack	Ripogonum scandens		Also called pirita in Māori.
Karo	Stiffleaf cheesewood	Pittosporum crassifolium		Also called kaikaro or kihiki in Māori.
Kātote	Soft tree fern	Alsophila smithii Cyathea smithii		
Kauri		Agathis sp.		The Māori term kauri is used around the world for various species; in New Zealand it almost always refers to the Agathis australis.
Kawakawa		Piper excelsum		See note after Kiwikiwi (below).
Kiekie		Freycinetia banksii		
Kiokio	Palm-leaf fern	Parablechnum novae-zelandiae		The name kiokio is also used as part of the name of Parablechnum procerum (Small or mountain kiokio).
Kiwikiwi	Star fern Creek fern	Cranfillia fluviatilis Blechnum fluviatile		Also sometimes referred to as kawakawa (qv).
Kohekohe	New Zealand mahogany	Didymocheton spectabilis		See note after Kōhia (below).
Kōhia	New Zealand passionflower New Zealand passionfruit	Passiflora tetrandra		Also sometimes referred to as kohekohe (qv).
Kōhūhū	Black matipo	Pittosporum tenuifolium		Also called kohukohu or tawhiwhi in Māori.
Korokio tāranga		Corokia sp.		
Koromiko	Willow-leaf hebe	Veronica salicifolia Veronica stricta		
Kōtukutuku	Tree fuchsia New Zealand fuchsia	Fuchsia excorticata		
Kōwhai		Sophora sp.		The national flower of New Zealand.
Kōwhai ngutu kākā	Kākā beak	Clianthus sp.		
Kūmara	Sweet potato	Ipomoea batatas		
Kūmarahou	Golden tainui Gumdigger's soap	Pomaderris kumeraho Pomaderris hamiltonii		
Māhoe	Whiteywood	Melicytus ramiflorus		
Makawe	Hanging spleenwort Drooping spleenwort Weeping spleenwort	Asplenium flaccidum		
Makomako	Wineberry	Aristotelia serrata		Often simply called Mako in Māori.
Mamaku	Black tree fern	Sphaeropteris medullaris Cyathea medullaris		
Mānawa	Grey mangrove White mangrove	Avicennia marina		
Mangemange	Bushman's mattress	Lygodium articulatum		
Mānuka		Leptospermum scoparium		
Mataī	Black pine	Prumnopitys taxifolia		
Mingimingi		Coprosma propinqua		The name mingimingi is also used as part of the name of Leucopogon fasciculatus (Tall mingimingi) and Leptecophylla juniperina (Prickly mingimingi)
Miro		Prumnopitys ferruginea		
Monoao	Silver pine Westland pine	Dracophyllum subulatum Halocarpus kirkii Manoao colensoi		The name monoao is used for two widely different plant types, the shrubby Dracophyllum and the tall trees Halocarpus and Manoao. The image shows shoots of the Halocarpus kirkii.

== N–R ==
Māori name	Alternative name(s)	Scientific name	Image	Notes
Neinei	Spiderwood	Dracophyllum latifolium		Image is of closely related species Dracophyllum traversi (Mountain neinei)
Ngaio	Mousehole tree	Myoporum laetum		
Ngārara wehi	Leather-leaf fern	Pyrrosia eleagnifolia		Also called ota in Māori
Nīkau	Nikau palm	Rhopalostylis sapida		
Pānoko	Thread fern	Blechnum filiforme Icarus filiformis		Also spelt pānako
Parataniwha	Begonia fern	Elatostema rugosum		
Paretao	Strap fern Finger fern	Notogrammitis billardierei		Not to be confused with peretao (qv)
Patē	Seven-finger; Umbrella tree	Schefflera digitata		
Petako	Sickle spleenwort	Asplenium polyodon		
Pikopiko	Hen and chicken fern Mother spleenwort Common shield fern	Asplenium bulbiferum Polystichum richardii		Also called mouku or mauku in Māori. The term pikopiko is also used for the curled baby shoots of many species of ferns.
Peretao	Waterfall fern	Blechnum colensoi		Not to be confused with paretao (qv)
Pīngao	Golden sand sedge	Ficinia spiralis		Called pīkao in Southern Māori.
Pōhutukawa		Metrosideros excelsa		Sometimes called "The New Zealand Christmas Tree" due to it regularly blooming in late December.
Pōkākā		Elaeocarpus hookerianus		
Ponga	Tree fern Silver fern	Cyathea dealbata		A national symbol of New Zealand.
Pūhā	Sow thistle Hare thistle	Sponchus sp.		Also called rareke or raraki in Māori.
Puka	Shining broadleaf	Griselinia lucida Meryta sinclairii		Also called Akapuka in Māori.
Pukatea		Laurelia novae-zelandiae		
Pukupuku	Rasp fern	Doodia media		
Rangiora	Bushman's friend	Brachyglottis repanda		Also known by a variety of other Māori names (see article).
Rātā		Metrosideros sp.		See also Akakura and Pōhutukawa (above).
Raurenga	Kidney fern	Hymenophyllum nephrophyllum		
Rereti	Lance water fern	Austroblechnum lanceolatum Blechnum chambersii		Also called nini in Māori.
Rewarewa	New Zealand honeysuckle	Knightia excelsa		
Rimu	Red pine	Dacrydium cupressinum		

== T–W ==
Māori name	Alternative name(s)	Scientific name	Image	Notes
Tānekaha	Celery pine	Phyllocladus trichomanoides		Also called Toatoa (see below)
Tarata	Lemonwood	Pittosporum eugenioides		
Tarawera	Button fern	Pellaea rotundifolia		
Tauhinu	Cottonwood	Ozothamnus leptophyllus Pomaderris phylicifolia		
Taupata	Mirror bush	Coprosma repens		
Taupeka	Gypsy fern	Ctenopteris heterophylla Notogrammitis heterophylla		
Tawa		Beilschmiedia tawa		
Tawāpou		Planchonella costata Pouteria costata		
Tāwhai	Silver beech	Nothofagus menziesii		
Tītoki	New Zealand oak	Alectryon excelsus		
Tī kouka	Cabbage tree	Cordyline australis		Often simply called Tī in Māori. Known in Britain, where it is an introduced species, as the Torbay or Torquay palm.
Toatoa	Celery pine	Phyllocladus toatoa Haloragis erecta		The Tānekaha (qv) is also sometimes called toatoa. The name toatoa is also used as part of the name of Phyllocladus alpinus (Mountain toatoa). The image shown is of Phyllocladus toatoa.
Toetoe	Toetoe grass	Austroderia sp.		
Tōtara		Podocarpus totara		
Tutu	Toot	Coriaria sp.		
Wharariki	Mountain flax	Phormium colensoi Phormium cookianum		
Whekī	Rough tree fern	Dicksonia squarrosa		
Whekī ponga	Golden tree fern	Dicksonia fibrosa		
