= Caloptilia chrysitis =

Scientific classification
- Kingdom: Animalia
- Phylum: Arthropoda
- Clade: Pancrustacea
- Class: Insecta
- Order: Lepidoptera
- Family: Gracillariidae
- Genus: Caloptilia
- Species: C. chrysitis

Binomial name
- Caloptilia chrysitis (Felder & Rogenhofer, 1875)

Synonyms
- Gracilaria chrysitis Felder & Rogenhofer, 1875; Caloptilia adelina (Meyrick, 1880); Caloptilia purpurea (Philpott, 1927); Caloptilia rutilans (Butler, 1880); Gracilaria purpurea Philpott, 1927

Species of moth endemic to New Zealand

Caloptilia chrysitis is a species of moth of the family Gracillariidae. It is endemic to New Zealand and has been observed in both the North and South Islands. This species inhabits damp native forest. Adults are most commonly observed on the wing from September until November and again from January until April. Larvae mine and fold the leaves of New Zealand species in the genera Pterophylla (including Pterophylla racemosa and Pterophylla sylvicola), Elaeocarpus (including Elaeocarpus dentatus and Elaeocarpus hookerianus) and also but rarely Knightia excelsa. The larvae pupate in the folded leaves of their host plants.

== Taxonomy ==
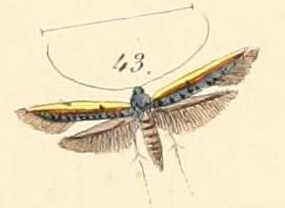
Illustration from first description.

This species was first described by Cajetan Felder and Alois Friedrich Rogenhofer in 1875 and originally named Gracilaria? chrysitis. In 1880 Arthur Gardiner Butler, thinking he was describing a new species named this moth Gracilaria rutilans. Also in 1880 Edward Meyrick, thinking he was describing a new species, named this moth Gracilaria adelina. In 1889 Meyrick synonymised both these names into Gracilaria chrysitis. In 1927 Alfred Philpott, also thinking he was describing a new species, named this moth Gracilaria purpurea. George Hudson discussed and illustrated this species also under the name Gracilaria chrysitis in his 1928 book The butterflies and moths of New Zealand. In 1988 John S. Dugdale placed this species in the genus Caloptilia and synonymised G. purpurea into this name. The male holotype, collected in Nelson by Thomas R. Oxley, is held in the Natural History Museum, London.

== Description ==
Hudson described this species as follows:

The expansion of the wings is about 1/2 inch. The fore-wings are very deep orange-red with coppery and purplish reflections; there is a very broad golden costal band; a deep purplish-blue discal spot before the middle and a series of minute blue streaks on the dorsum. The hind-wings are grey. The intermediate legs have the femur and tibia thickened and densely clothed with brilliant red scales interspersed with a few brilliant blue scales.

The conspicuous silver colouring on the underside of the head and thorax as well as the tufts of scales on the intermediate tibiae give the insect a striking appearance.

In 1939 Hudson stated that he had observed a rare form of this species in Wellington and Picton. He described the form as follows:

the orange-red colouring on head, thorax and dorsum of fore-wings is entirely replaced by deep glistening purple, with slight coppery reflections. The tibiae of the anterior legs and the scale tufts on the tibiae of the middle legs are also purple.

== Distribution ==
This species is endemic to New Zealand. It has been observed in both the North and South Islands.

== Habitat and hosts ==
C. chrysitis mines in leaves of Pterophylla sylvicola.

C. chrysitis at rest.

C. chrysitis inhabits damp places in native forest. The larvae mine and fold the leaves of New Zealand species in the genus Weinmannia (now known as Pterophylla) including Pterophylla racemosa and Pterophylla sylvicola, in the genus Elaeocarpus including Elaeocarpus dentatus and Elaeocarpus hookerianus, and also but rarely the species Knightia excelsa. The larvae pupate in the rolled leaf of their host plant.

== Behaviour ==
Adults are on the wing most commonly from September until November and again from January until April. When at rest adults of this species assume a curious position. The wings are closely rolled around the body; the antennae are placed backwards along the mid-back. The anterior and intermediate legs are each placed close together with the moth standing on tiptoe. The wings form a tripod shape which supports the insect in a position inclined at about 45 degrees. The hind-legs and body are hidden within the cylinder formed by the wings, giving the moth an striking appearance when at rest.
