= Society Islands tropical moist forests =

Terrestrial ecoregion in the Society Islands of French Polynesia

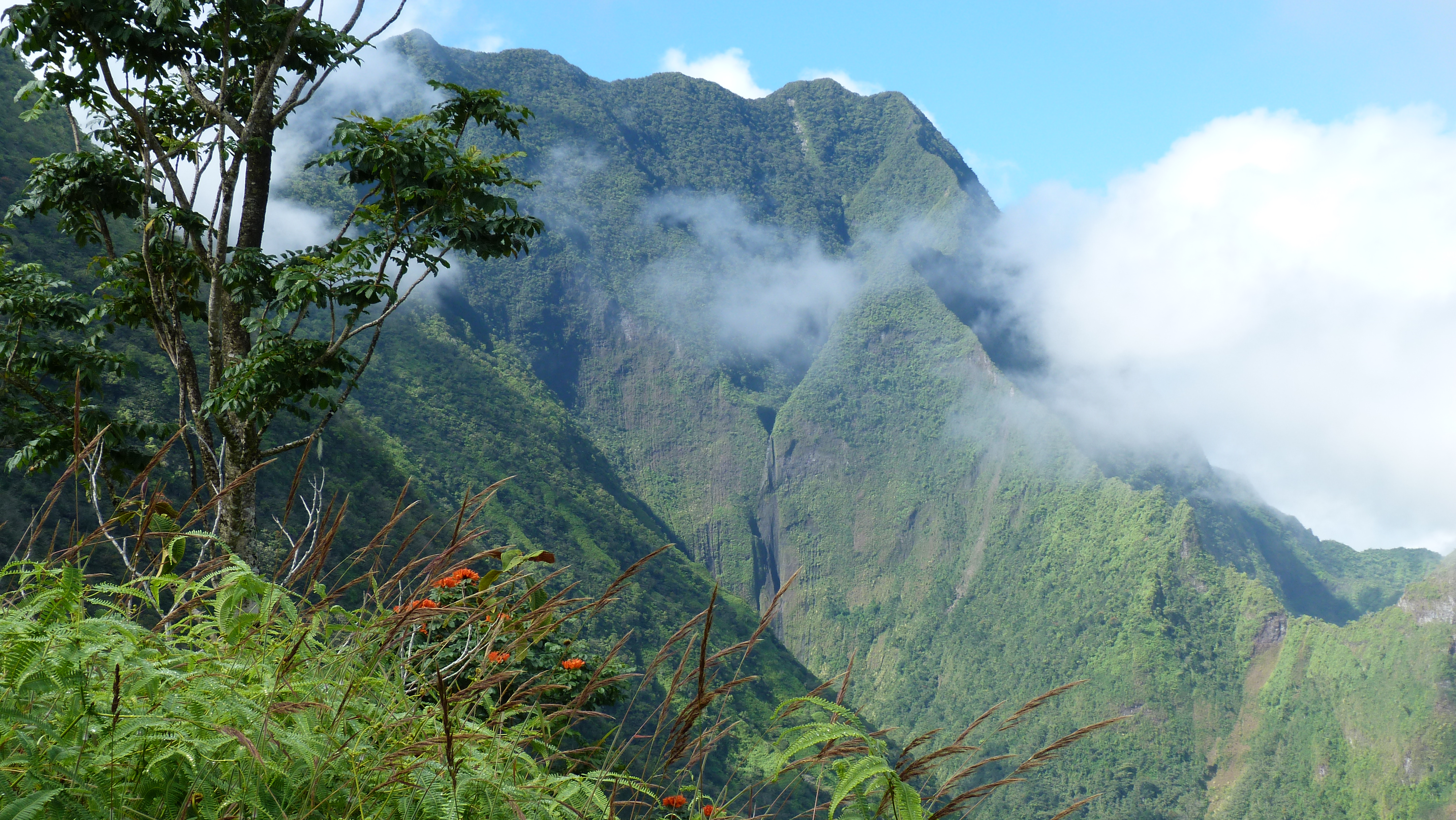
- Mount Aorai on Tahiti

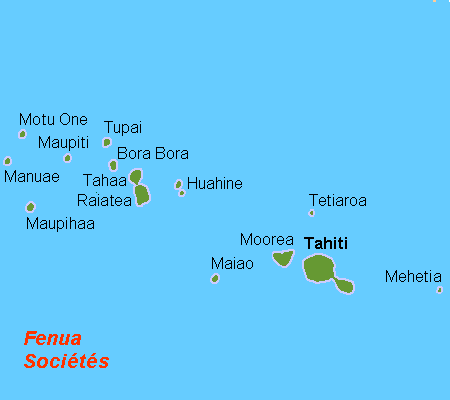
- Map of the Society Islands

Ecology
- Realm: Oceanian
- Biome: tropical and subtropical moist broadleaf forests

Geography
- Area: 1,205 km^{2} (465 sq mi)
- Country: French Polynesia
- Administrative subdivisions: Leeward Islands; Windward Islands

Conservation
- Conservation status: Critical/endangered
- Protected: 41 km² (3%)

The Society Islands tropical moist forests is a tropical and subtropical moist broadleaf forests ecoregion in the Society Islands of French Polynesia.

== Geography ==
The Society Islands is a group of 14 islands, including nine high dormant volcanoes and five low coral atolls. They extend from 16º to 18º S latitude and from 148º to 154º W longitude. The islands comprise two groups, the Windward Islands (French: Îles du Vent) to the east and the Leeward Islands (French: Îles Sous-le-vent) to the west.

Tahiti in the Windward group is the largest of the Society Islands, with an area of 1,042 km^{2}. The highest elevation in the islands (2,241 m) is also on Tahiti.

The islands were formed as the Pacific Plate moved slowly west-northwest over a volcanic hotspot. The islands increase in age from east to west. Mehetia at the eastern end of the chain is the youngest at less than 1 million years old, while Moorea is 1.5 million to 2 million years old. The western Leeward islands are at least 4.5 million years old, and have eroded and subsided to leave low coral atolls. The high islands' soils are mostly derived from basalt. Coralline limestone soils occur in coastal areas where ancient reefs were uplifted by geologic processes, and atoll soils are mostly of coral sand.

== Climate ==
The climate is humid and tropical. Average annual rainfall ranges from 1,700 mm near sea level to 8,000 mm or greater on windward mountain slopes. The summer months of December through February are the rainiest months, while March through November are typically cooler and drier. Easterly trade winds are consistent through much the year, and the eastern or windward sides of islands generally receive more rainfall. Mean annual temperature is 26º C.

== Flora ==
The natural vegetation is principally tropical rain forest, and includes lowland rain forests, montane rain forests, and cloud forests.

Lowland rain forest was once the most widespread forest type, but has been cleared from most of the coastal lowlands and is now found in valleys and on lower mountain slopes. Typical tree species include Inocarpus fagifer, Cananga odorata, Rhus taitensis, Pisonia umbellifera, Macaranga sp., Glochidion sp., Hibiscus tiliaceus, Tarenna sambucina, and the introduced Aleurites moluccana, along with the bamboo Schizostachyum glaucifolium.

Montane rain forests occur above 300 m, and extend to higher elevations on the drier western slopes. The characteristic trees include Alphitonia zizyphoides, Hernandia moerenhoutiana, Metrosideros collina, Fagraea sp., Canthium spp., and Wikstroemia sp.

Cloud forests occur between 400 and 1000 meters elevation, generally on the wetter eastern (windward) slopes. The easterly winds cool as they ascend the mountain slopes, and moisture condenses as rain and nearly continual cloud cover. Average annual temperatures are much cooler than in the lowlands, ranging from 14 to 18 °C. Pterophylla parviflora and Alstonia costata are the dominant tree species. Other common trees and shrubs include tree ferns (Cyathea spp.) Fitchia spp., Myrsine spp., Fuchsia cyrtandroides, Sclerotheca spp., Cyrtandra spp., Metrosideros collina, Coprosma spp., and Psychotria spp. The trees are covered with epiphytic plants and lichens. The tree fern Angiopteris evecta on Moorea forms a canopy up to 9 meters wide.

The islands are home to 623 native species of vascular plants, including 273 endemic species and one endemic genus. The trees Myrsine raiateensis and Pterophylla raiateensis are endemic to Raitaea. The Raiatean endemics Sclerotheca raiateensis and Kadua raiateensis are considered endangered.

== Fauna ==
The ancestors of the islands' native fauna arrived via long-distance dispersal from other islands, and evolved into distinct forms over millions of years.

BirdLife International designates the Society Islands as an endemic bird area based on the islands' five surviving endemic species and several extinct ones. Three species recorded on Captain Cook's 1773 visit, the Tahiti rail (Gallirallus pacificus) from Tahiti, the Tahitian sandpiper (Prosobonia leucoptera) from Moorea and Tahiti, and the Raiatea parakeet (Cyanoramphus ulietanus) from Raiatea are now extinct. Other extinct endemic species include the black-fronted parakeet (Cyanoramphus zealandicus) and Maupiti monarch (Pomarea pomarea).

Endangered native species include an endemic subspecies of striated heron (Butorides striatus patruelis), the Society Islands pigeon (Ducula aurorae), Tahiti reed warbler (Acrocephalus caffer), Tahiti swiftlet (Aerodramus leucophaeus), and Tahiti monarch (Pomarea nigra).

Land snails in the genera Partula and Samoana are part of the islands' unique biodiversity. From ancestors that are thought to have to have arrived in a single colonization event, the Partula land snails evolved into 53 distinct species. They were once found throughout the high islands. The native land snails on Tahiti and Moorea have been decimated by introduced predatory land snails Euglandina rosea and Gonaxis spp., and 15 species are now extinct or endangered.

== Conservation and threats ==
Humans have extensively altered the flora and fauna of the islands since the arrival of Polynesians 1000 to 2000 years ago. Polynesian settlers brought plants like the coconut palm (Cocos nucifera) and candlenut tree (Aleurites moluccana) which have naturalized across the archipelago, as well as pigs and the Polynesian rat (Rattus exulans). Europeans started visiting the islands in the 18th century and later conquered and settled there, and brought many more exotic plants and animals.

The lowlands below 500 meters elevation have mostly been cleared of the native forests, and replaced with coconut plantations and other crops, or with anthropogenic grasslands maintained by frequently-set fires.

Europeans brought black rats (Rattus rattus) and brown rats (R. norvegicus), which along with house cats have devastated the islands' native birds. Archeological sites have recovered remains of ten seabird species and 14 land birds which are no longer present on the islands. These include the extinct Huahine gull (Chroicocephalus utunui), two parrots (Vini vidivici and V. sinotoi), three pigeons, and the Raiatea starling (Aplonis sp.), along with two species of Prosobonia sandpiper, three species of parrots, and one pigeon that have gone extinct since Europeans arrived.

Relatively intact natural vegetation covers about 30% of the ecoregion. Relatively intact but unprotected areas include lowland Inocarpus forest and the Oponohu lowland forest on Moorea, the Vallée de Vaiote on Tahiti, the Vallée d’Avera and montane forest on Raiatea, Manuae island, and seabird colonies on Tetiaroa, Fenuaura, Motuone, and Mopiihaa atolls.

The greatest threat to the Society Islands' wild forests is the invasive tree Miconia calvescens. It was introduced in 1937 from South America, and has expanded to cover large areas of Tahiti and portions of Moorea and Raiatea. The trees form dense stands up to 15 meters high which shade out all but their own seedlings. The tree's seeds are dispersed by birds, and manual removal has been necessary to keep them from spreading to new areas and to smaller islands.

== Protected areas ==
A 2017 assessment found that 41 km², or 3%, of the ecoregion is in protected areas. Protected areas include:

- Lagon de Moorea on Moorea
- Mont Mara’u Conservation Area on Tahiti (10 km²)
- TeFa’aiti Natural Park on Tahiti was established in 1989, and has an area of 750 ha. The park protects mid-elevation lowland (valley) rain forest (70–500 m), montane forest on a mid-elevation plateau (500–700 m), and high-elevation cloud forest and subalpine vegetation on steep slopes (up to 2110 m). Invasive species in the park include the plants Miconia calvescens, Rubus rosifolius, Spathodea campanulata, and Tecoma stans, along with black rats and Polynesian rats.
- Temehani Ute Ute Management Area on Raiatea was established in 2010, and has an area of 69 ha. It protects a forested plateau between 415 and 817 meters elevation. Invasive species in the reserve include the plants Rhodomyrtus tomentosa, Miconia calvescens, Psidium cattleianum, Cecropia peltata, and Rubus rosifolius, along with feral pigs, black rats, and Polynesian rats.
- Manuae and Motu One Natural Reserves on Manuae (Scilly) and Motu One (Bellinghausen) atolls were established in 1971, with an area of 1180 ha. The reserves protect atoll coastal vegetation and atoll forest between sea level and 2 meters elevation. Portions of the reserves are covered with naturalized coconut plantations and the invasive plants Stachytarpheta cayennensis and Cenchrus echinatus.
