= Pterophylla parviflora =

Conservation status
- Least Concern (IUCN 3.1)

Scientific classification
- Kingdom: Plantae
- Clade: Tracheophytes
- Clade: Angiosperms
- Clade: Eudicots
- Clade: Rosids
- Order: Oxalidales
- Family: Cunoniaceae
- Genus: Pterophylla
- Species: P. parviflora

Binomial name
- Pterophylla parviflora (G.Forst.) Pillon & H.C.Hopkins

Synonyms
- Leiospermum parviflorum D.Don; Weinmannia parviflora G.Forst.; Windmannia parviflora (G.Forst.) Kuntze

Species of flowering plant

Pterophylla parviflora, formerly known as Weinmannia parviflora, is a species of flowering plant in the family Cunoniaceae. It is a tree endemic to the Society Islands of French Polynesia.

== Range and habitat ==
It is present on the islands of Tahiti, Moorea, Huahine, Tahaa, and Bora Bora. Together with Alstonia costata, Pterophylla parviflora is a predominant tree of the islands' cloud forests, which grow on the wetter eastern (windward) slopes of the larger islands between 400 and 1000 meters elevation.

On Tahiti it is the most common tree in primary montane forest above 400 meters elevation. It is co-dominant with Metrosideros collina in slope and ridge forest at medium and high elevations, and in Pterophylla–Alstonia cloud forest at high elevations. Other associated trees include species of Alphitonia, Dodonaea, and Psidium at middle elevations, and Myrsine, Coprosma, Cyathea, Vaccinium, Alyxia, Polyscias, and Ilex at higher elevations. It also grows in scrub and slopes covered by the fern Dicranopteris linearis.

On Huahine it grows in montane forest on the island's central crest between Mount Matoereere and Mount Turi, from 450 meters elevation to the island's summit at 670 m. These forests are dominated by Metrosideros collina and Macaranga sp., with Alstonia and Myrsine.

On Moorea it is co-dominant with Metrosideros collina in montane forests above 400–500 meters elevation, and in cloud forest with Ilex, Myrsine, and Metrosideros at higher elevations up to 1200 m.
