= Pterophylla ouaiemensis =

Conservation status
- Critically Endangered (IUCN 3.1)

Scientific classification
- Kingdom: Plantae
- Clade: Embryophytes
- Clade: Tracheophytes
- Clade: Angiosperms
- Clade: Eudicots
- Clade: Rosids
- Order: Oxalidales
- Family: Cunoniaceae
- Genus: Pterophylla
- Species: P. ouaiemensis

Binomial name
- Pterophylla ouaiemensis (Guillaumin & Virot) Pillon & H.C.Hopkins

Synonyms
- Cunonia ouaiemensis Guillaumin & Virot; Weinmannia ouaiemensis (Guillaumin & Virot) Hoogland

Species of flowering plant

Pterophylla ouaiemensis, formerly known as Weinmannia ouaiemensis, is a species of plant in the family Cunoniaceae. It is endemic to New Caledonia.
