= Pterophylla rutenbergii =

Conservation status
- Least Concern (IUCN 3.1)

Scientific classification
- Kingdom: Plantae
- Clade: Tracheophytes
- Clade: Angiosperms
- Clade: Eudicots
- Clade: Rosids
- Order: Oxalidales
- Family: Cunoniaceae
- Genus: Pterophylla
- Species: P. rutenbergii

Binomial name
- Pterophylla rutenbergii (Engl.) J.Bradford & Z.S.Rogers (2021)

Synonyms
- Weinmannia rutenbergii Engl. (1880); Windmannia rutenbergii (Engl.) Kuntze (1891); Weinmannia eriocarpa f. fruticulosa Pamp. (1905)

Species of flowering plant

Pterophylla rutenbergii is a species of plant in the family Cunoniaceae endemic to Madagascar. The species is common and has a widespread distribution. It can be found from sea level to 2000 metres elevation at the summits at Marojejy National Park. It grows in the lowland rain forests of eastern Madagascar and the montane and subhumid forests in the center and north of the island. The species does best in open, disturbed habitat, particularly on roadsides and areas recently burned.

The species exhibits high morphological plasticity, ranging from being shrub-like with small leaves at high elevations to being a large canopy tree with large leaves in lowland areas.
