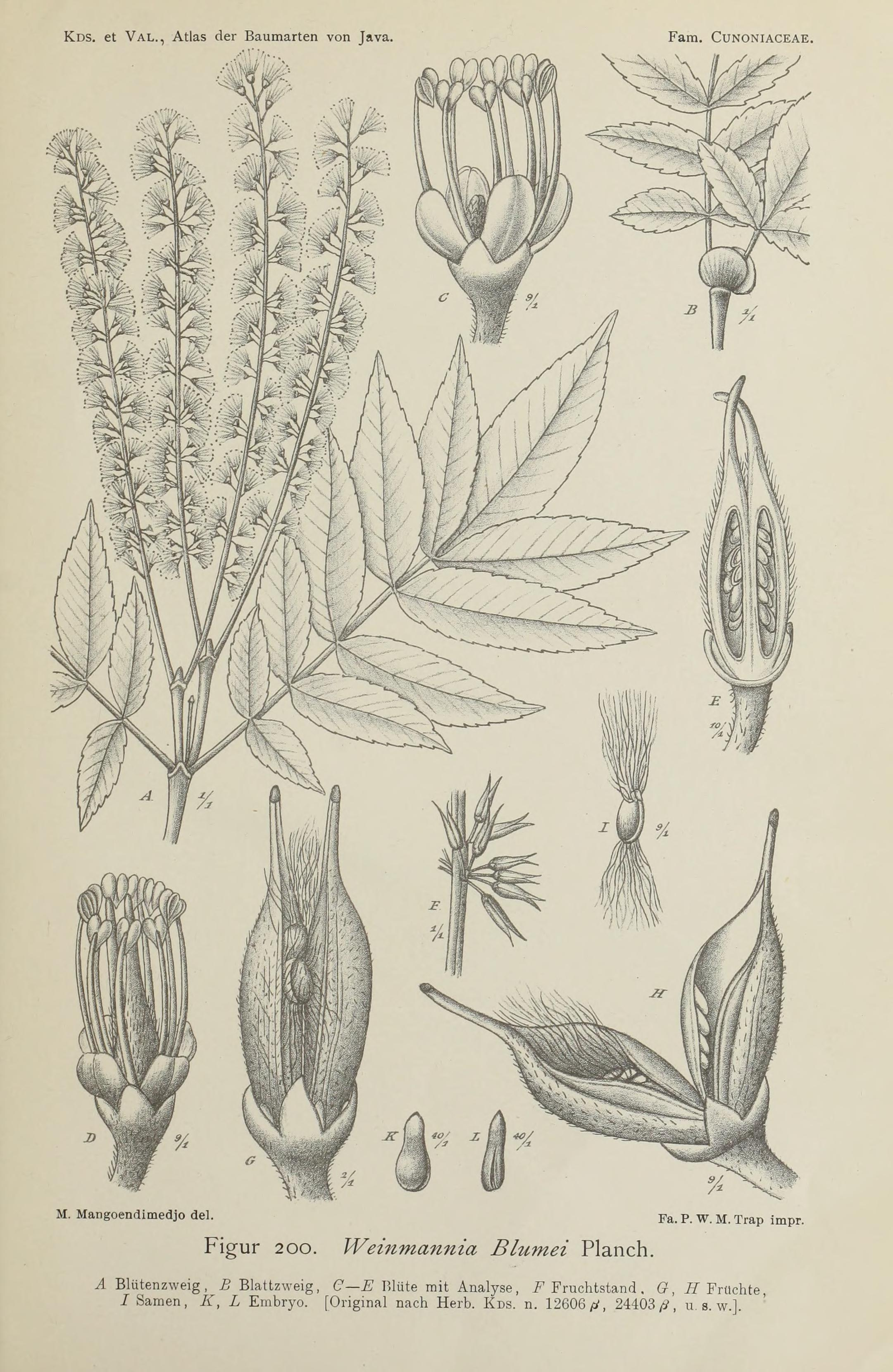

Conservation status
- Least Concern (IUCN 3.1)

Scientific classification
- Kingdom: Plantae
- Clade: Tracheophytes
- Clade: Angiosperms
- Clade: Eudicots
- Clade: Rosids
- Order: Oxalidales
- Family: Cunoniaceae
- Genus: Pterophylla
- Species: P. fraxinea

Binomial name
- Pterophylla fraxinea D.Don

Synonyms
- Synonymy: Arnoldia fraxinifolia Blume; Arnoldia heterophylla Blume; Arnoldia pinnata Blume; Spiraea pinnata Blume; Weinmannia alta Engl.; Weinmannia arnoldia A.Gray; Weinmannia blumei Planch.; Weinmannia borneensis Engl.; Weinmannia dictyoneura Schltr.; Weinmannia dulitensis Airy Shaw; Weinmannia fraxinea (D.Don); Windmannia fraxinea (D.Don) Kuntze; Weinmannia fraxinifolia (Blume) Miq.; Weinmannia horsfieldii Miq.; Weinmannia hypoglauca Kaneh.; Weinmannia ledermannii Schltr.; Weinmannia papuana Schltr.; Weinmannia sundana Miq.; Weinmannia tomentella Schltr.; Windmannia blumei (Planch.) Kuntze; Windmannia horsfieldii (Miq.) Kuntze; Windmannia sundana (Miq.) Kuntze

= Pterophylla fraxinea =

Species of tree

Pterophylla fraxinea, formerly known as Weinmannia fraxinea, is a tree in the family Cunoniaceae. It grows up to 40 metres (130 ft) tall. The bark is grey to dark brown. Inflorescences bear up to three pairs of flowers. The specific epithet fraxinea is from the Latin meaning 'ash tree', referring to the leaves' resemblance to those of the genus Fraxinus.

The tree grows in a wide variety of habitats from sea level to 2,000 metres (6,600 ft) elevation. P. fraxinea is found widely in Malesia. In Malaysia's Sarawak state the leaves are used to make a dye.

== Range and habitat ==
Pterophylla fraxinea ranges from Peninsular Thailand and Peninsular Malaysia through Sumatra, Borneo, Java, Maluku, and the Lesser Sunda Islands to New Guinea and the Solomon Islands. It is absent from Sulawesi and the Philippines.

It typically grows at medium to high elevations in the western (Malesian) portion of its range, and is more frequent at lower elevations in New Guinea and the Solomon Islands. It grows from (450–)1000–2065 metres elevation in Peninsular Malaysia and Thailand, 500–2700 m in Sumatra, 600–2400 m in Java, (0-)500–1970 m in Borneo, 500–1500+ m in the Lesser Sunda Islands, 10–1450(–2250) m in New Guinea, and 10–620 m in the Solomons.

In western Malesia it is a locally-common small tree in primary and secondary hill forests above about 500 metres elevation, often on ridges and slopes below ridge tops. It is commonly found with trees of family Casuarinaceae. It also grows in montane forests at higher elevations, including mossy heath forest and montane rain forest, and in dwarf subalpine forest and shrubland and low alpine shrubland. In Borneo it also grows in low- to mid-elevation heath forest on sandy nutrient-poor soils, including Agathis-dominated forest, and in peat swamp forest near sea level.
