= Pterophylla comorensis =

Scientific classification
- Kingdom: Plantae
- Clade: Tracheophytes
- Clade: Angiosperms
- Clade: Eudicots
- Clade: Rosids
- Order: Oxalidales
- Family: Cunoniaceae
- Genus: Pterophylla
- Species: P. comorensis

Binomial name
- Pterophylla comorensis (Tul.) J.Bradford & Z.S.Rogers (2021)

Synonyms
- Weinmannia comorensis Tul. (1857); Windmannia comorensis (Tul.) Kuntze (1891)

Species of flowering plant

Pterophylla comorensis, formerly known as Weinmannia comorensis, is a species of plant in the family Cunoniaceae. It is a tree endemic to the Comoro Islands.
