= Pterophylla aphanoneura =

Conservation status
- Least Concern (IUCN 3.1)

Scientific classification
- Kingdom: Plantae
- Clade: Tracheophytes
- Clade: Angiosperms
- Clade: Eudicots
- Clade: Rosids
- Order: Oxalidales
- Family: Cunoniaceae
- Genus: Pterophylla
- Species: P. aphanoneura

Binomial name
- Pterophylla aphanoneura (Airy Shaw) Pillon & H.C.Hopkins

Synonyms
- Weinmannia aphanoneura Airy Shaw

Species of plant

Pterophylla aphanoneura, formerly known as Weinmannia aphanoneura, is a species of plant in the family Cunoniaceae. It is a shrub or tree native to Borneo, with a single record from western Sumatra.

Pterophylla aphanoneura grows in montane rain forest from 1,175 to 2,560 metres elevation. Its habitat includes open moss forest, ericaceous mossy forest, and submontane heath forest.
