= Hangehange =

Hangehange is a Māori language name for the following plant species:

- Elaeocarpus dentatus, a large native tree of New Zealand also commonly called hinau
- Geniostoma rupestre var. ligustrifolium, a native shrub of New Zealand, also called New Zealand privet
