= Pterophylla richii =

Conservation status
- Least Concern (IUCN 3.1)

Scientific classification
- Kingdom: Plantae
- Clade: Tracheophytes
- Clade: Angiosperms
- Clade: Eudicots
- Clade: Rosids
- Order: Oxalidales
- Family: Cunoniaceae
- Genus: Pterophylla
- Species: P. richii

Binomial name
- Pterophylla richii (A.Gray) Pillon & H.C.Hopkins (2021)

Synonyms
- Weinmannia richii A.Gray (1854); Weinmannia rhodogyne Gibbs (1909); Windmannia richii (A.Gray) Kuntze (1891)

Species of flowering plant

Pterophylla richii, formerly Weinmannia richii, is a species of flowering plant in the family Cunoniaceae. It is a shrub or tree endemic to Fiji.
