= Pterophylla clemensiae =

Conservation status
- Least Concern (IUCN 3.1)

Scientific classification
- Kingdom: Plantae
- Clade: Tracheophytes
- Clade: Angiosperms
- Clade: Eudicots
- Clade: Rosids
- Order: Oxalidales
- Family: Cunoniaceae
- Genus: Pterophylla
- Species: P. clemensiae

Binomial name
- Pterophylla clemensiae (Steenis) Pillon & H.C.Hopkins

Synonyms
- Weinmannia clemensiae Steenis

Species of plant

Pterophylla clemensiae, formerly known as Weinmannia clemensiae, is a species of plant in the family Cunoniaceae. It is endemic to Borneo. It is a tree or treelet growing up to 10 metres tall.

Pterophylla clemensiae is native to Mount Kinabalu and Mount Tambuyukon in Kinabalu Park in Sabah, Malaysia. It has a restricted range, with an estimated area of occupancy (AOO) of 32 km^{2} and extent of occurrence (EOO) of 120 km^{2}.

It grows in open-canopied dwarf upper montane forests on soils formed from ultramafic rock between 1,500 and 2,700 metres elevation. It is relatively abundant in its specialized habitat.
