= Pterophylla vitiensis =

Conservation status
- Endangered (IUCN 3.1)

Scientific classification
- Kingdom: Plantae
- Clade: Embryophytes
- Clade: Tracheophytes
- Clade: Angiosperms
- Clade: Eudicots
- Clade: Rosids
- Order: Oxalidales
- Family: Cunoniaceae
- Genus: Pterophylla
- Species: P. vitiensis

Binomial name
- Pterophylla vitiensis (Seem.) Pillon & H.C.Hopkins

Synonyms
- Weinmannia vitiensis Seem.

Species of flowering plant

Pterophylla vitiensis, formerly known as Weinmannia vitiensis, is a species of plant in the family Cunoniaceae. It is a tree endemic to Fiji.
