= Pterophylla exigua =

Conservation status
- Near Threatened (IUCN 3.1)

Scientific classification
- Kingdom: Plantae
- Clade: Embryophytes
- Clade: Tracheophytes
- Clade: Angiosperms
- Clade: Eudicots
- Clade: Rosids
- Order: Oxalidales
- Family: Cunoniaceae
- Genus: Pterophylla
- Species: P. exigua

Binomial name
- Pterophylla exigua (A.C.Sm.) Pillon & H.C.Hopkins

Synonyms
- Weinmannia exigua A.C.Sm.

Species of shrub

Pterophylla exigua, formerly known as Weinmannia exigua, is a species of plant in the family Cunoniaceae. It is endemic to Fiji. This scarce shrub or small tree is known from a single population of 30 to 40 individual plants in Cakaudrove Province on Vanua Levu. It grows in forest or thicket at low elevations. Its known habitat is in at high risk of fires.
