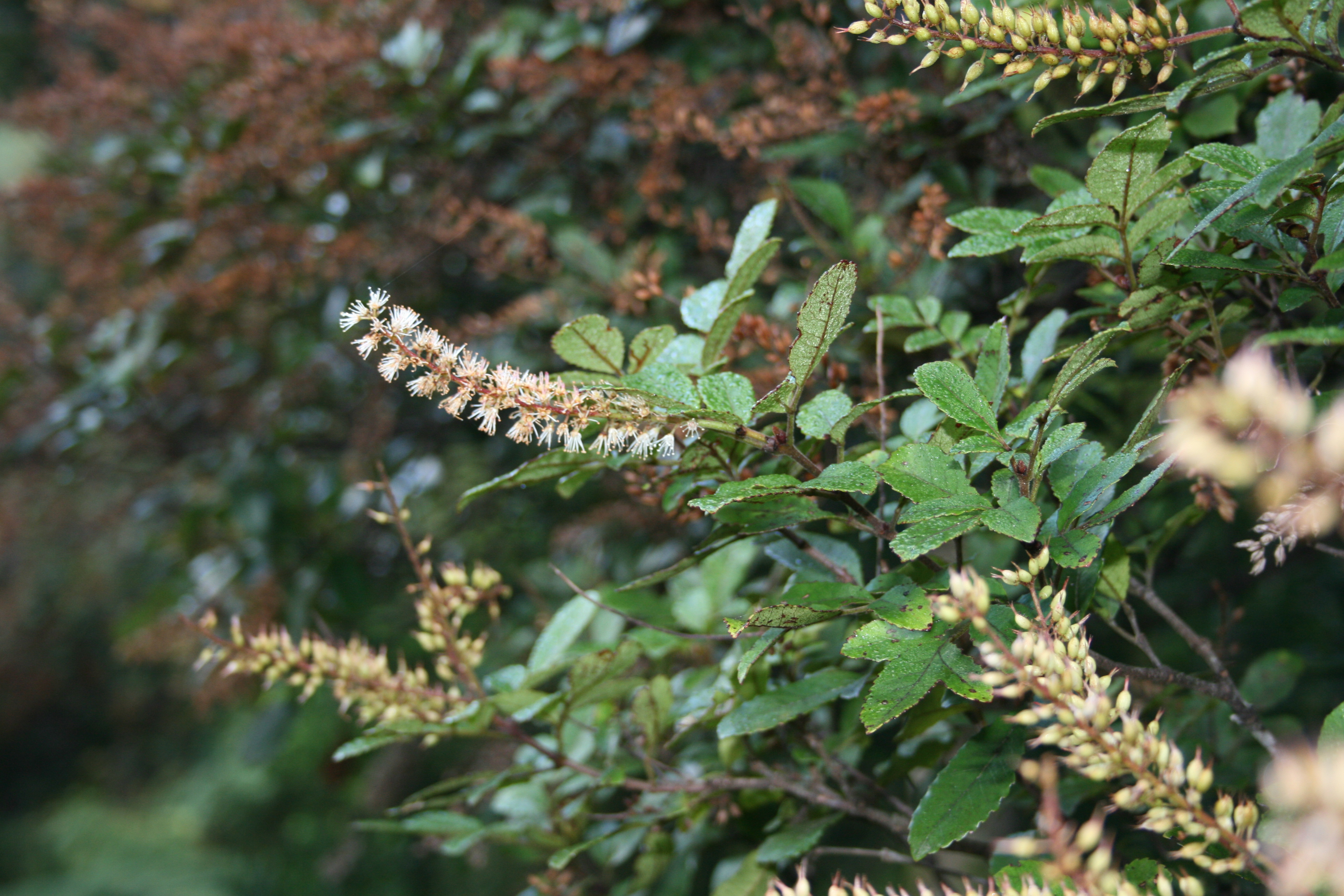
- Flowers and leaves of tōwai (Pterophylla sylvicola)

Scientific classification
- Kingdom: Plantae
- Clade: Tracheophytes
- Clade: Angiosperms
- Clade: Eudicots
- Clade: Rosids
- Order: Oxalidales
- Family: Cunoniaceae
- Genus: Pterophylla; D.Don

= Pterophylla (plant) =

Genus of flowering plant

Pterophylla is a genus of trees of the family Cunoniaceae, with species found growing naturally in Madagascar, Malesia, Papuasia, and the Pacific Islands, formerly included in Weinmannia.

== Range and habitat ==
Species of Pterophylla are native to Madagascar and the Comoro Islands, and to Malesia (Peninsular Thailand and Malaysia, Sumatra, Borneo, Java, the Lesser Sunda Islands, Sulawesi, Maluku, and the Philippines), Papuasia (New Guinea, the Bismarck Archipelago, and Solomon Islands), Vanuatu, New Caledonia, New Zealand, and parts of Oceania (Fiji, Cook Islands, Marquesas Islands, Samoa Islands, Society Islands, and Tubuai Islands).

Species of Pterophylla grow in lowland tropical forests in Madagascar, and generally in hill and montane tropical forests on the larger islands of Malesia and the Pacific. They are absent from Oceania's low coraline islands, but can be abundant on the higher volcanic islands from 300 to 750+ metres elevation. They are also found in subtropical and temperate forest in New Zealand between 0 and 1180 metres elevation.

== Classification ==
The genus was first described by David Don in 1830. It is often treated as a synonym of Weinmannia.

A phylogenomic study by Pillon et al. (2021) concluded that Weinmannia was paraphyletic, and formed two distinct clades. The species belonging to the four Old World sections – Fasciculatae, Inspersae, Spicatae, and Leiospermum – formed a monophyletic group, which is sister to the Old World genera Cunonia and Pancheria. Section Weinmannia, which includes species from the Americas and the Mascarene Islands, is sister to the Old World assemblage. They proposed placing the four Old World sections into the revived genus Pterophylla, with genus Weinmannia limited to the American and Mascarene species of section Weinmannia.

== Species ==
There are 68 accepted species, which are divided among four sections – Pterophylla (formerly Fasciculatae), Leiospermum, Spicatae, and Inspersae.

=== sect. Pterophylla ===
(mostly Malesia and Papuasia, from Sumatra to Fiji)

- Pterophylla aphanoneura (Airy Shaw) Pillon & H.C.Hopkins – Borneo
- Pterophylla celebica (Koord.) Pillon & H.C.Hopkins – Sulawesi
- Pterophylla clemensiae (Steenis) Pillon & H.C.Hopkins - Borneo
- Pterophylla coodei (H.C.Hopkins) Pillon & H.C.Hopkins – Sulawesi
- Pterophylla descombesiana (Bernardi) Pillon & H.C.Hopkins – Sulawesi
- Pterophylla devogelii (H.C.Hopkins) Pillon & H.C.Hopkins – Sulawesi
- Pterophylla exigua (A.C.Sm.) Pillon & H.C.Hopkins – Fiji (Vanua Levu)
- Pterophylla eymana (H.C.Hopkins) Pillon & H.C.Hopkins – Sulawesi
- Pterophylla fraxinea D.Don – Malay Peninsula, Borneo, Sumatra, Java, Lesser Sunda Islands, Maluku Islands, New Guinea, Solomon Islands.
- Pterophylla furfuracea (H.C.Hopkins) Pillon & H.C.Hopkins – Sulawesi and Maluku Islands
- Pterophylla hooglandii (H.C.Hopkins & J.Bradford) Pillon & H.C.Hopkins – Malay Peninsula
- Pterophylla hutchinsonii (Merr.) Pillon & H.C.Hopkins – Philippines
- Pterophylla lucida (Merr.) Pillon & H.C.Hopkins – Philippines (Luzon and Samar)
- Pterophylla luzoniensis (S.Vidal) Pillon & H.C.Hopkins – Philippines (Luzon)
- Pterophylla macgillivrayi (Seem.) Pillon & H.C.Hopkins – Vanuatu
- Pterophylla negrosensis (Elmer) Pillon & H.C.Hopkins – Philippines and Sulawesi
- Pterophylla pullei (Schltr.) Pillon & H.C.Hopkins – New Guinea
- Pterophylla richii (A.Gray) Pillon & H.C.Hopkins – Fiji
- Pterophylla urdanetensis (Elmer) Pillon & H.C.Hopkins – Philippines and Papuasia
- Pterophylla ysabelensis (L.M.Perry) Pillon & H.C.Hopkins – Solomon Islands (Santa Isabel Island)

=== sect. Leiospermum (D.Don) Pillon & H.C.Hopkins ===
(mostly Pacific, from the Bismarck Archipelago to the Marquesas)

- Pterophylla affinis (A.Gray) Pillon & H.C.Hopkins (synonym Pterophylla samoensis (A.Gray) Pillon & H.C.Hopkins) – Fiji, Samoan Islands, and Rarotonga
- Pterophylla croftii (H.C.Hopkins) Pillon & H.C.Hopkins – Bismarck Archipelago
- Pterophylla denhamii (Seem.) Pillon & H.C.Hopkins – Vanuatu
- Pterophylla dichotoma (Brongn. & Gris) Pillon & H.C.Hopkins – New Caledonia
- Pterophylla marquesana (F.Br.) Pillon & H.C.Hopkins – Marquesas Islands
- Pterophylla ouaiemensis (Guillaumin & Virot) Pillon & H.C.Hopkins – northern New Caledonia
- Pterophylla paitensis (Schltr.) Pillon & H.C.Hopkins – central and southeastern New Caledonia
- Pterophylla parviflora (G.Forst.) Pillon & H.C.Hopkins – Society Islands
- Pterophylla purpurea (L.M.Perry) Pillon & H.C.Hopkins – Bougainville Island
- Pterophylla racemosa (L.f.) Pillon & H.C.Hopkins – New Zealand
- Pterophylla raiateensis (J.W.Moore) Pillon & H.C.Hopkins – Raiatea
- Pterophylla rapensis (F.Br.) Pillon & H.C.Hopkins – Rapa Iti
- Pterophylla serrata (Brongn. & Gris) Pillon & H.C.Hopkins – New Caledonia
- Pterophylla sylvicola (Sol. ex A.Cunn.) Pillon & H.C.Hopkins – New Zealand North Island
- Pterophylla tremuloides (H.C.Hopkins & J.Florence) Pillon & H.C.Hopkins – Marquesas (Fatu Hiva)
- Pterophylla vescoi (Drake) Pillon & H.C.Hopkins – Society Islands (Raiatea and Tahiti)
- Pterophylla vitiensis Pillon & H.C.Hopkins - Fiji

=== sect. Spicatae (Bernardi ex J.Bradford) Pillon & H.C.Hopkins ===
(Madagascar and the Comoros)

- Pterophylla arguta (Bernardi) J.Bradford & Z.S.Rogers – Madagascar
- Pterophylla baehniana (Bernardi) J.Bradford & Z.S.Rogers – Madagascar
- Pterophylla bernardii J.Bradford & Z.S.Rogers – Madagascar
- Pterophylla bojeriana (Tul.) J.Bradford & Z.S.Rogers – Madagascar
- Pterophylla bradfordii (I.M.Turner) J.Bradford & Z.S.Rogers - Madagascar
- Pterophylla comorensis (Tul.) J.Bradford & Z.S.Rogers – Comoros
- Pterophylla decora (Tul.) J.Bradford & Z.S.Rogers - Madagascar
- Pterophylla eriocarpa (Tul.) J.Bradford & Z.S.Rogers – Madagascar
- Pterophylla hildebrandtii (Baill.) J.Bradford & Z.S.Rogers – Madagascar
- Pterophylla humbertiana (Bernardi) J.Bradford & Z.S.Rogers – Madagascar
- Pterophylla humblotii (Baill.) J.Bradford & Z.S.Rogers – Madagascar
- Pterophylla icacifolia (Bernardi) J.Bradford & Z.S.Rogers – northern and eastern Madagascar
- Pterophylla lucens (Baker) J.Bradford & Z.S.Rogers – Madagascar
- Pterophylla magnifica (J.Bradford & Z.S.Rogers) J.Bradford & Z.S.Rogers - Madagascar
- Pterophylla mammea (Bernardi) J.Bradford & Z.S.Rogers – Madagascar
- Pterophylla marojejyensis (J.S.Mill. & J.Bradford) J.Bradford & Z.S.Rogers – Madagascar
- Pterophylla minutiflora (Baker) J.Bradford & Z.S.Rogers – Madagascar
- Pterophylla pauciflora (J.Bradford) J.Bradford & Z.S.Rogers – Madagascar
- Pterophylla rakotomalazana (J.Bradford) J.Bradford & Z.S.Rogers – Madagascar
- Pterophylla sanguisugarum (Bernardi) J.Bradford & Z.S.Rogers – Madagascar
- Pterophylla stenostachya (Baker) J.Bradford & Z.S.Rogers – Madagascar

=== sect. Inspersae (Bernardi ex J.Bradford) Pillon & H.C.Hopkins ===
(Madagascar)

- Pterophylla aggregata (Z.S.Rogers & J.Bradford) J.Bradford & Z.S.Rogers – Madagascar
- Pterophylla commersonii (Bernardi) J.Bradford & Z.S.Rogers – Madagascar
- Pterophylla henricorum (Bernardi) J.Bradford & Z.S.Rogers – Madagascar
- Pterophylla hepaticarum (Bernardi) J.Bradford & Z.S.Rogers – Madagascar
- Pterophylla louveliana (Bernardi) J.Bradford & Z.S.Rogers – Madagascar
- Pterophylla lowryana (J.Bradford) J.Bradford & Z.S.Rogers – Madagascar
- Pterophylla madagascariensis (DC. ex Ser.) J.Bradford & Z.S.Rogers – eastern Madagascar
- Pterophylla rutenbergii (Engl.) J.Bradford & Z.S.Rogers – Madagascar
- Pterophylla venusta (Bernardi) J.Bradford & Z.S.Rogers – Madagascar
