= Akatea =

Akatea is the Māori name for at least two different species of white-flowering climbing vine from New Zealand:

- Metrosideros albiflora
- Metrosideros perforata
Plants named Akatea
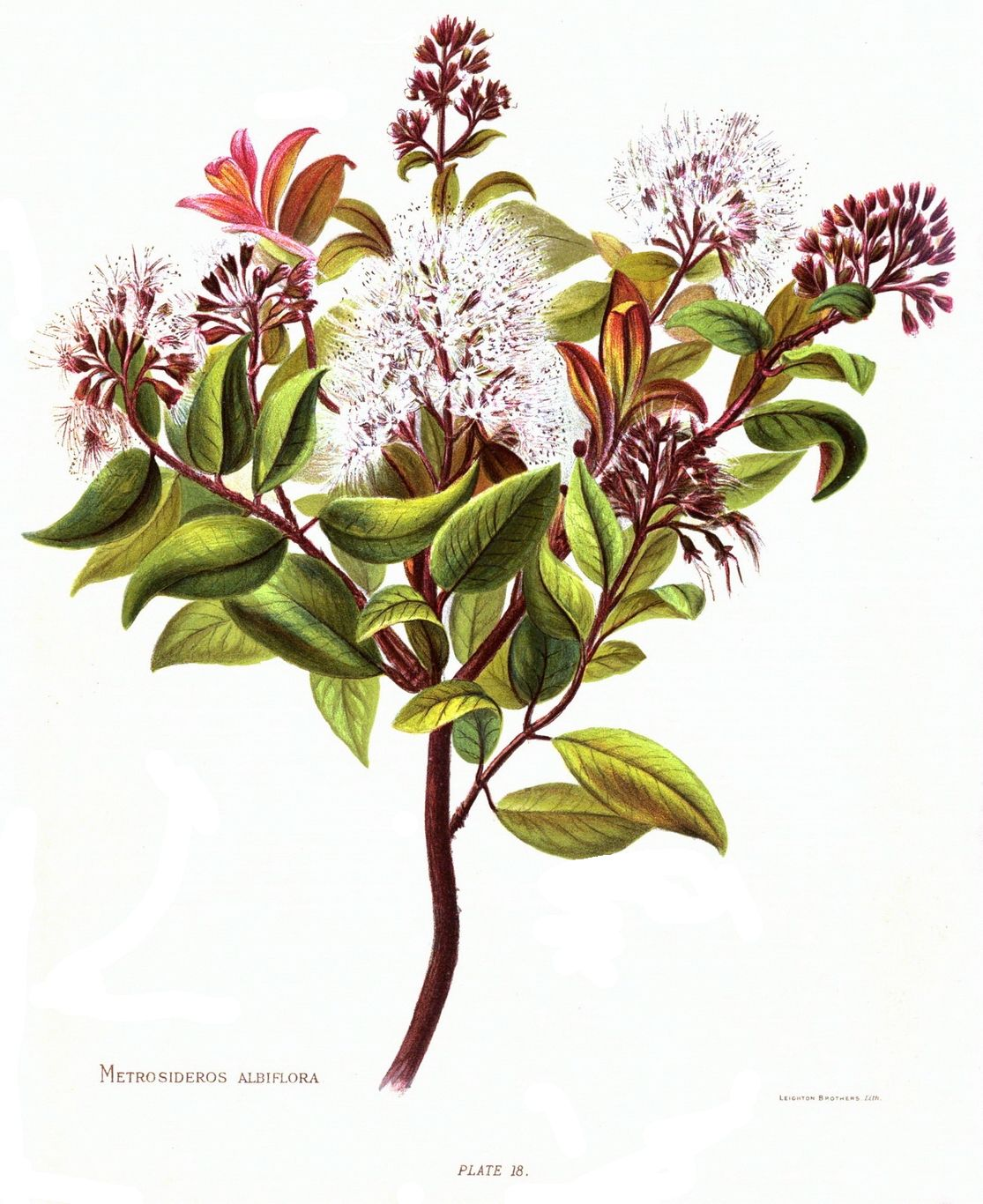
Metrosideros albiflora

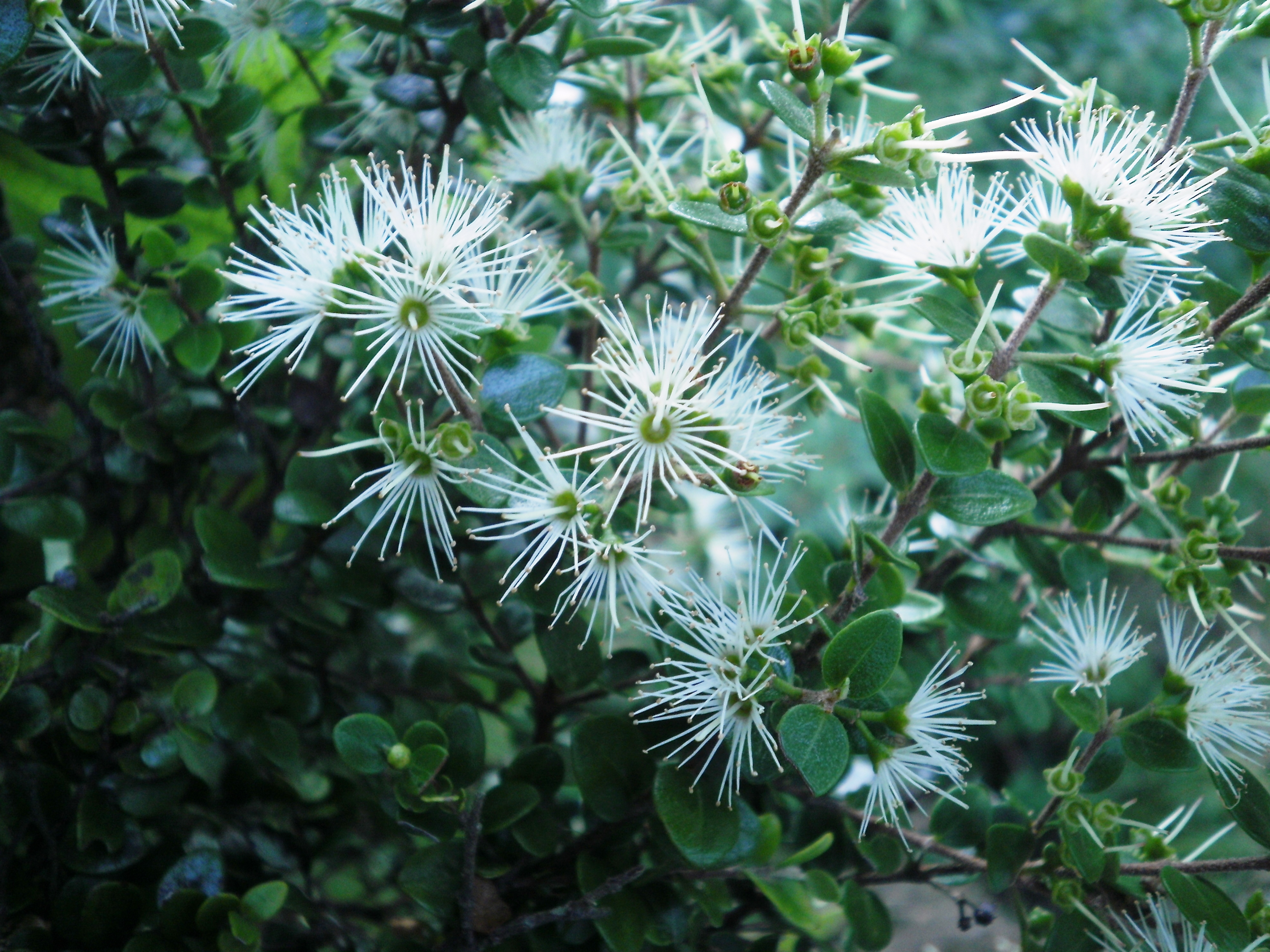
Metrosideros perforata
