= Koromiko =

Koromiko may refer to:

- Veronica salicifolia, a plant endemic to New Zealand
- Veronica stricta, a plant endemic to New Zealand
- Koromiko, New Zealand, a locality in Marlborough, New Zealand
