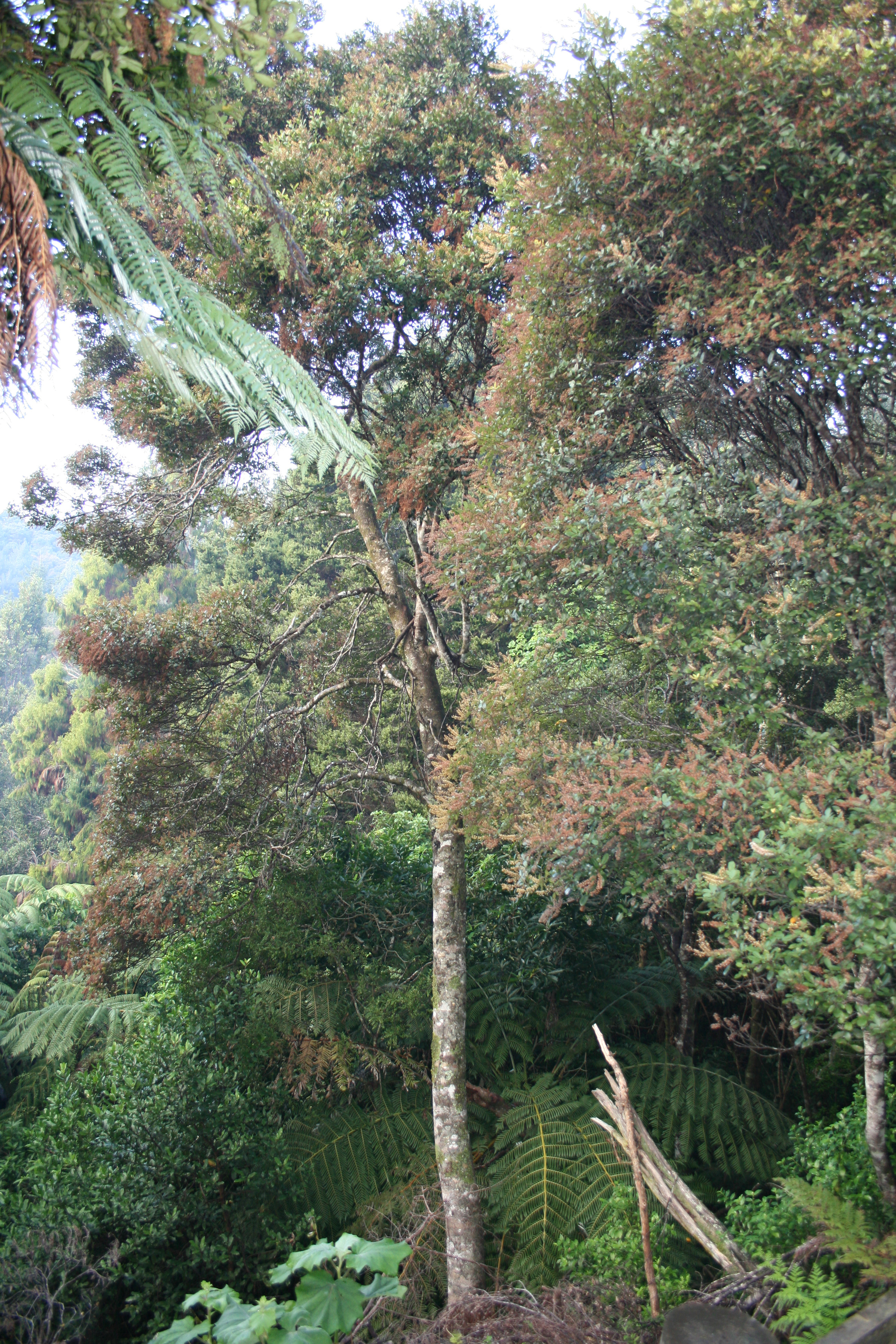

Conservation status
- Least Concern (IUCN 3.1)

Scientific classification
- Kingdom: Plantae
- Clade: Tracheophytes
- Clade: Angiosperms
- Clade: Eudicots
- Clade: Rosids
- Order: Oxalidales
- Family: Cunoniaceae
- Genus: Pterophylla
- Species: P. sylvicola

Binomial name
- Pterophylla sylvicola (Sol. ex A.Cunn.) Pillon & H.C.Hopkins

Synonyms
- Pterophylla sylvicola var. betulina (A.Cunn.) Pillon & H.C.Hopkins; Weinmannia betulina A.Cunn.; Weinmannia fuchsioides A.Cunn.; Weinmannia sylvicola Sol. ex A.Cunn.; Weinmannia sylvicola var. betulina (A.Cunn.) Hook.f.

= Pterophylla sylvicola =

Tōwai, tawhero

Species of tree

Pterophylla sylvicola, known as tōwai or tawhero, is a medium-sized evergreen tree of the family Cunoniaceae native to northern New Zealand. It is formerly known as Weinmannia sylvicola.

== Description ==
It grows to 15 m or more, with a trunk up to 1 m in diameter. Adult leaves are toothed and leathery, with up to five pairs of leaflets. Juvenile leaves are thinner and have up to ten pairs of leaflets. Its flowers are small and pink or white, occurring in 8–12 cm racemes. Its fruits are 4–5 cm capsules, which release many tiny seeds that are dispersed by wind.

== Range and habitat ==
Tōwai occurs in forest and forest margins from North Cape south to the Waitākere Ranges west of Auckland. A closely related tree, kāmahi (P. racemosa), replaces tōwai south of latitude 37°S.

== Gallery ==
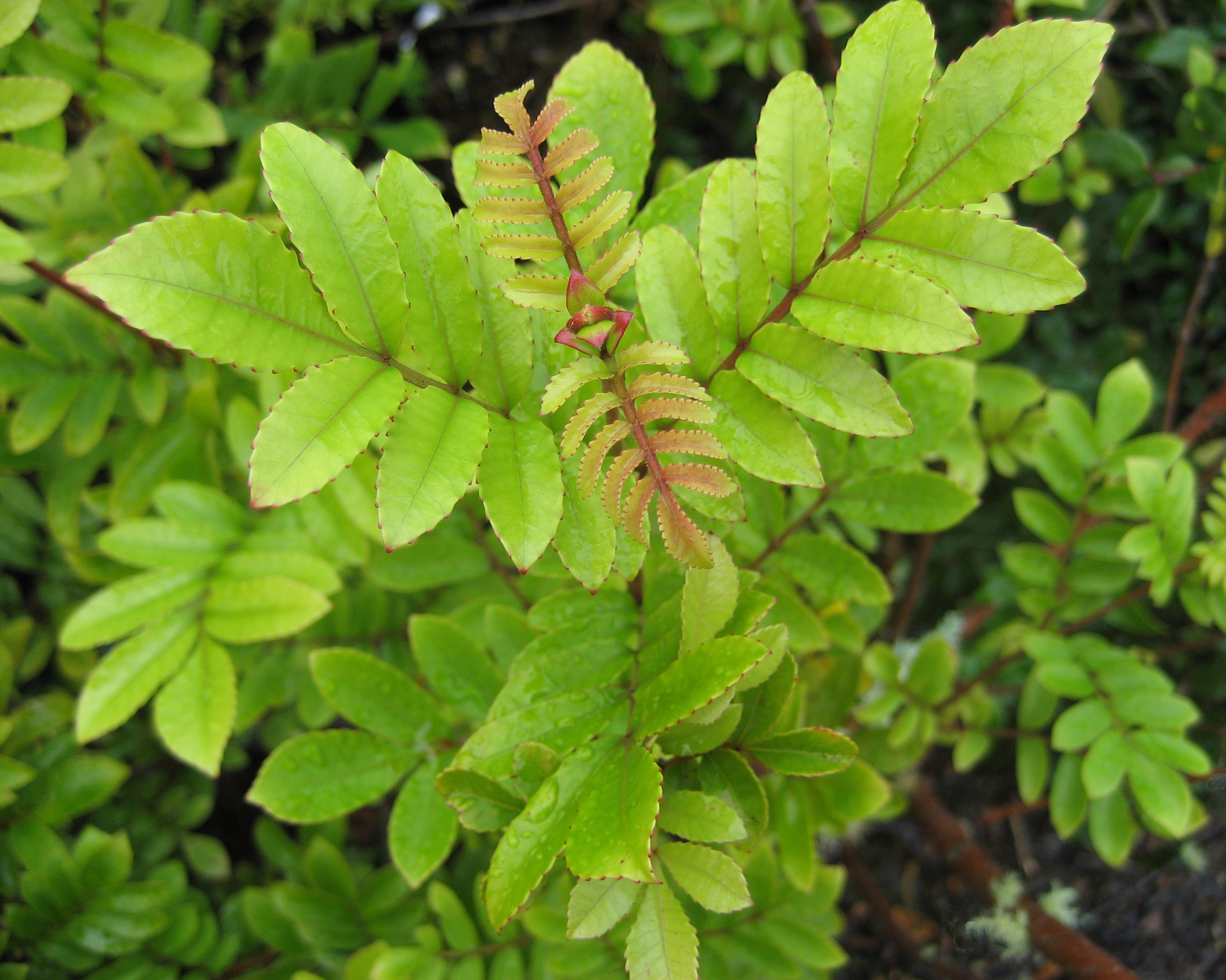
Foliage

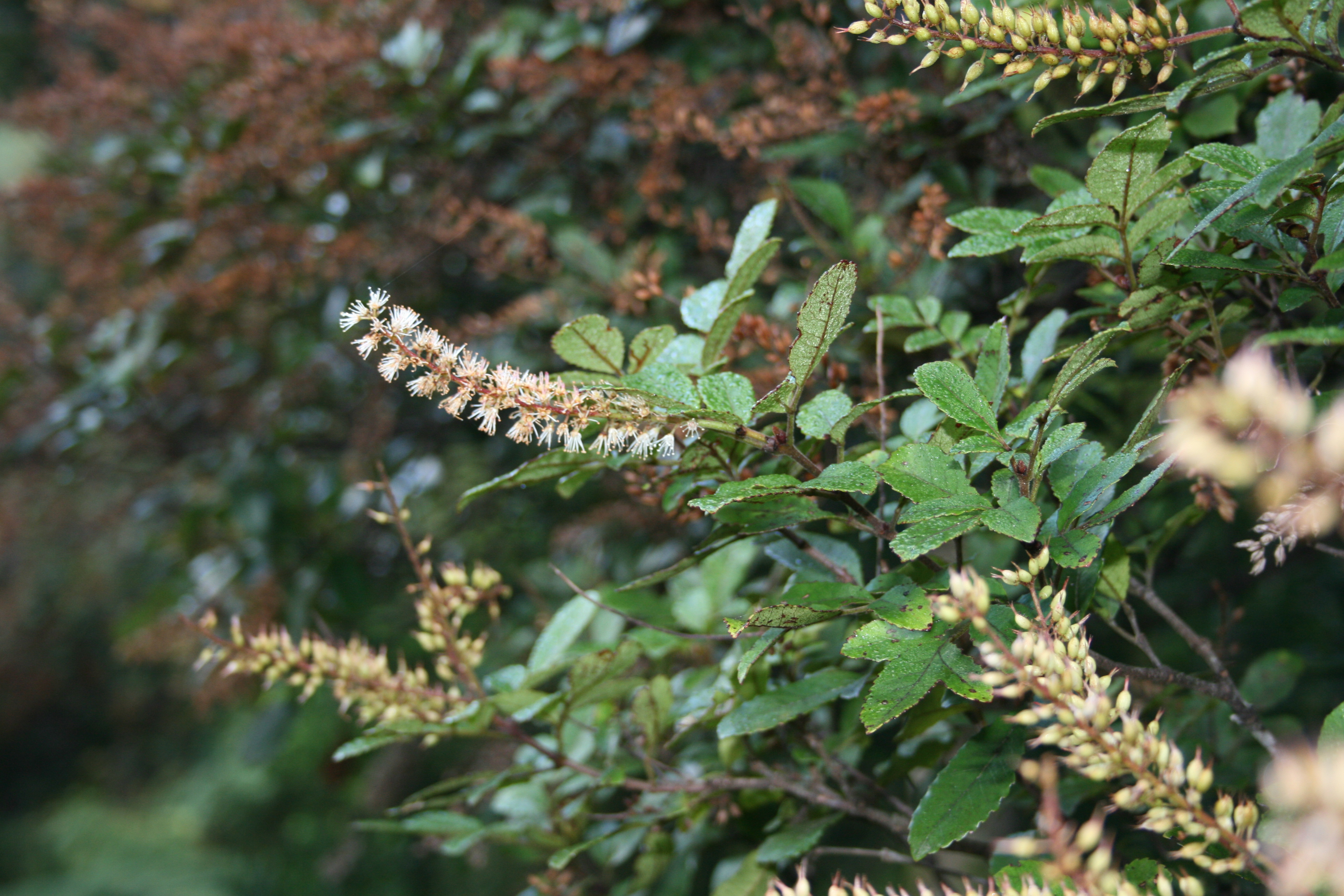
Flowers

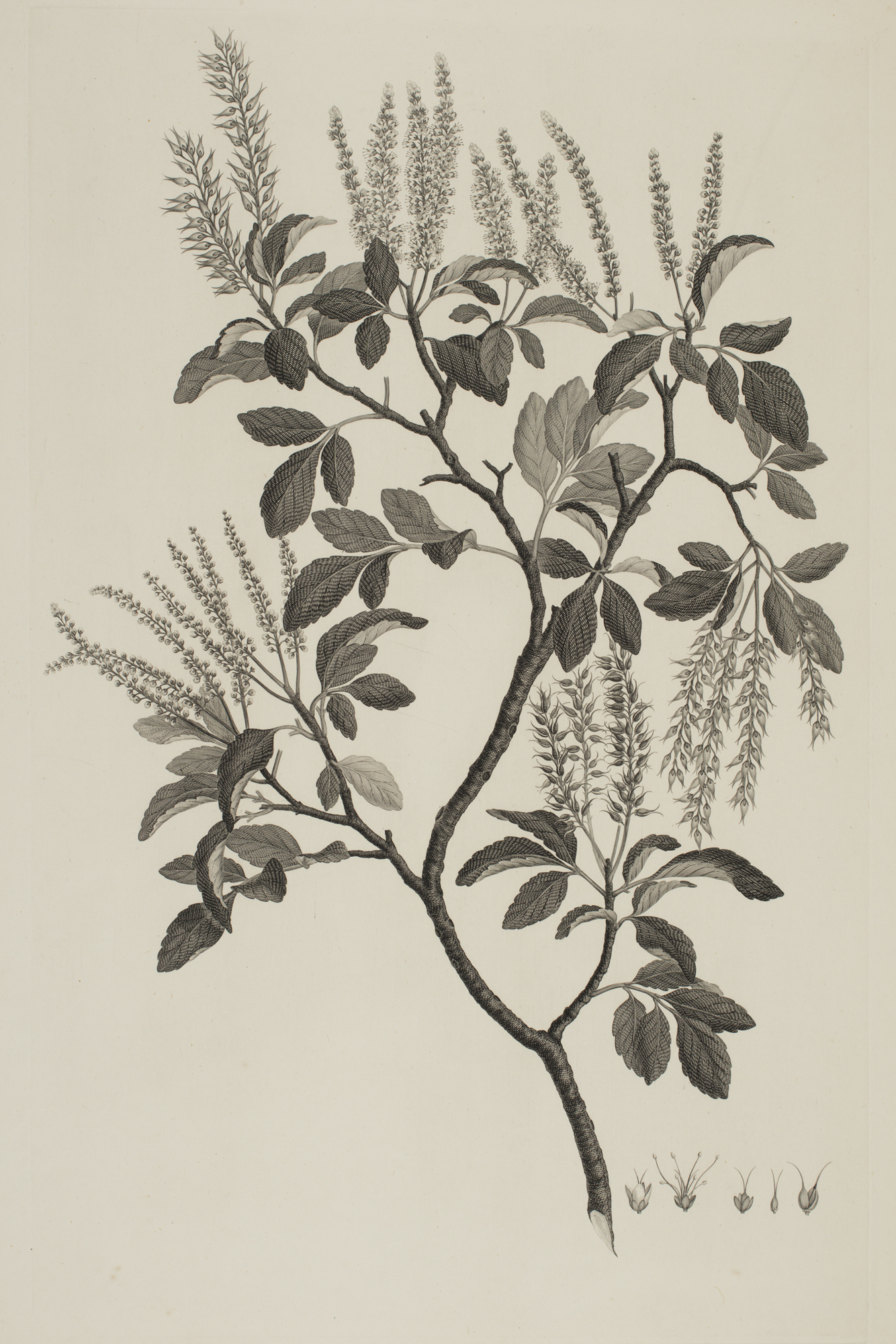
1895 botanical illustration by Sydney Parkinson
