= Monoao =

Monoao refers to the following plants of New Zealand:

- Dracophyllum subulatum
- Halocarpus kirkii, a native tree of New Zealand resembling a kauri
- Manoao colensoi, a native conifer of New Zealand, also called silver pine
