= Pterophylla raiateensis =

Conservation status
- Near Threatened (IUCN 3.1)

Scientific classification
- Kingdom: Plantae
- Clade: Tracheophytes
- Clade: Angiosperms
- Clade: Eudicots
- Clade: Rosids
- Order: Oxalidales
- Family: Cunoniaceae
- Genus: Pterophylla
- Species: P. raiateensis

Binomial name
- Pterophylla raiateensis (J.W.Moore) Pillon & H.C.Hopkins

Synonyms
- Weinmannia raiateensis J.W.Moore

Species of flowering plant

Pterophylla raiateensis, formerly known as Weinmannia raiateensis, is a species of plant in the family Cunoniaceae. It is endemic to the island of Raiatea, in the Society Islands of French Polynesia.
