= Tauhinu =

Tauhinu is the Māori name for two species of plants native to New Zealand.

- Ozothamnus leptophyllus, a common colonising shrub
- Pomaderris phylicifolia, an endangered colonising plant
