= Heketara =

Heketara is the Māori name for at least two different species of plants native to New Zealand:

- Olearia rani, a widespread small native forest tree.
- Lepidium oleraceum, a threatened coastal plant.

== See also ==
- Puccinia heketara, a species of fungus
