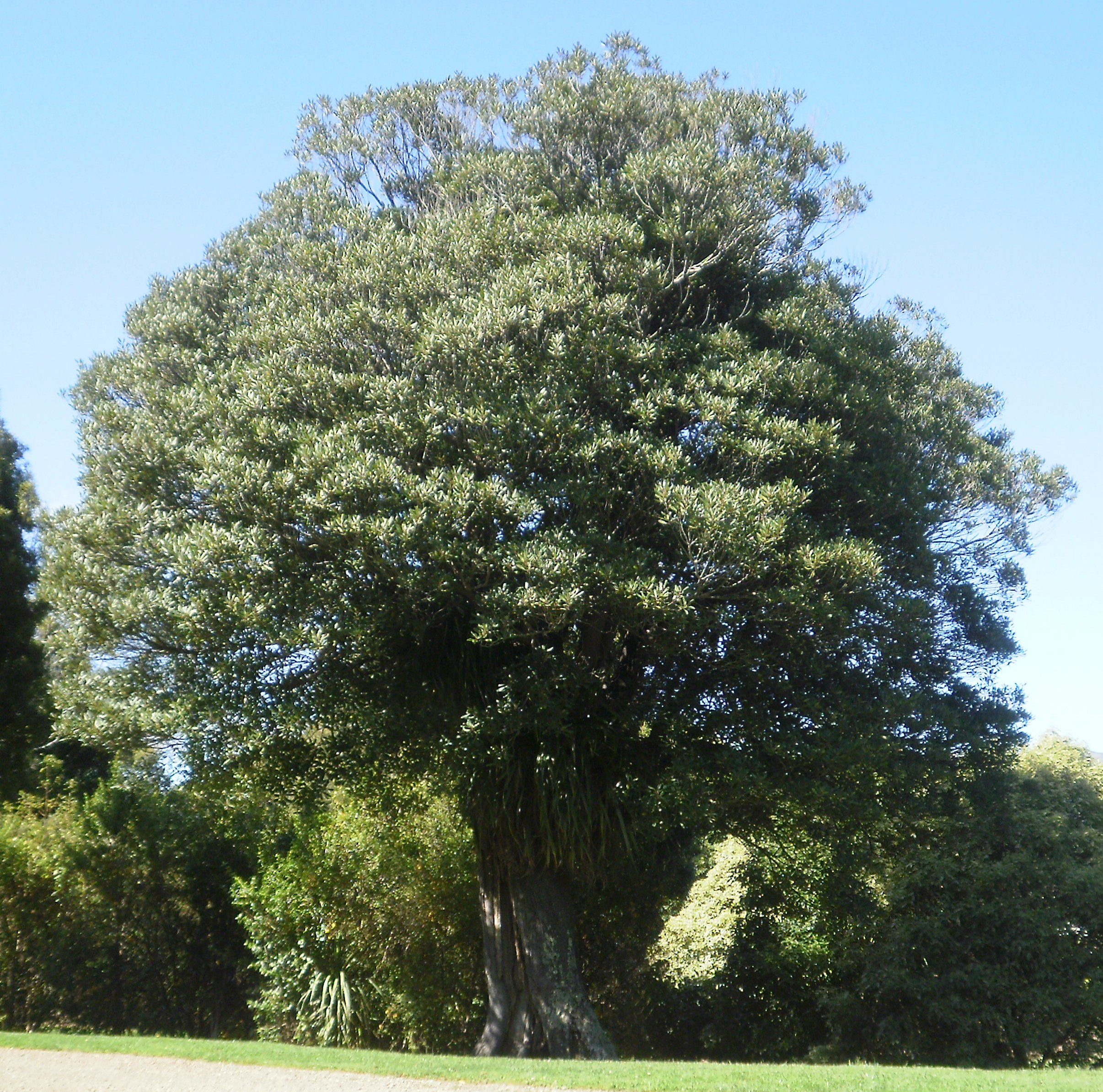
- E. dentatus in Lower Hutt

Scientific classification
- Kingdom: Plantae
- Clade: Embryophytes
- Clade: Tracheophytes
- Clade: Angiosperms
- Clade: Eudicots
- Clade: Rosids
- Order: Oxalidales
- Family: Elaeocarpaceae
- Genus: Elaeocarpus
- Species: E. dentatus

Binomial name
- Elaeocarpus dentatus (J.R.Forst. & G.Forst.) Vahl

Varieties
- Elaeocarpus dentatus var. dentatus; Elaeocarpus dentatus var. obovatus
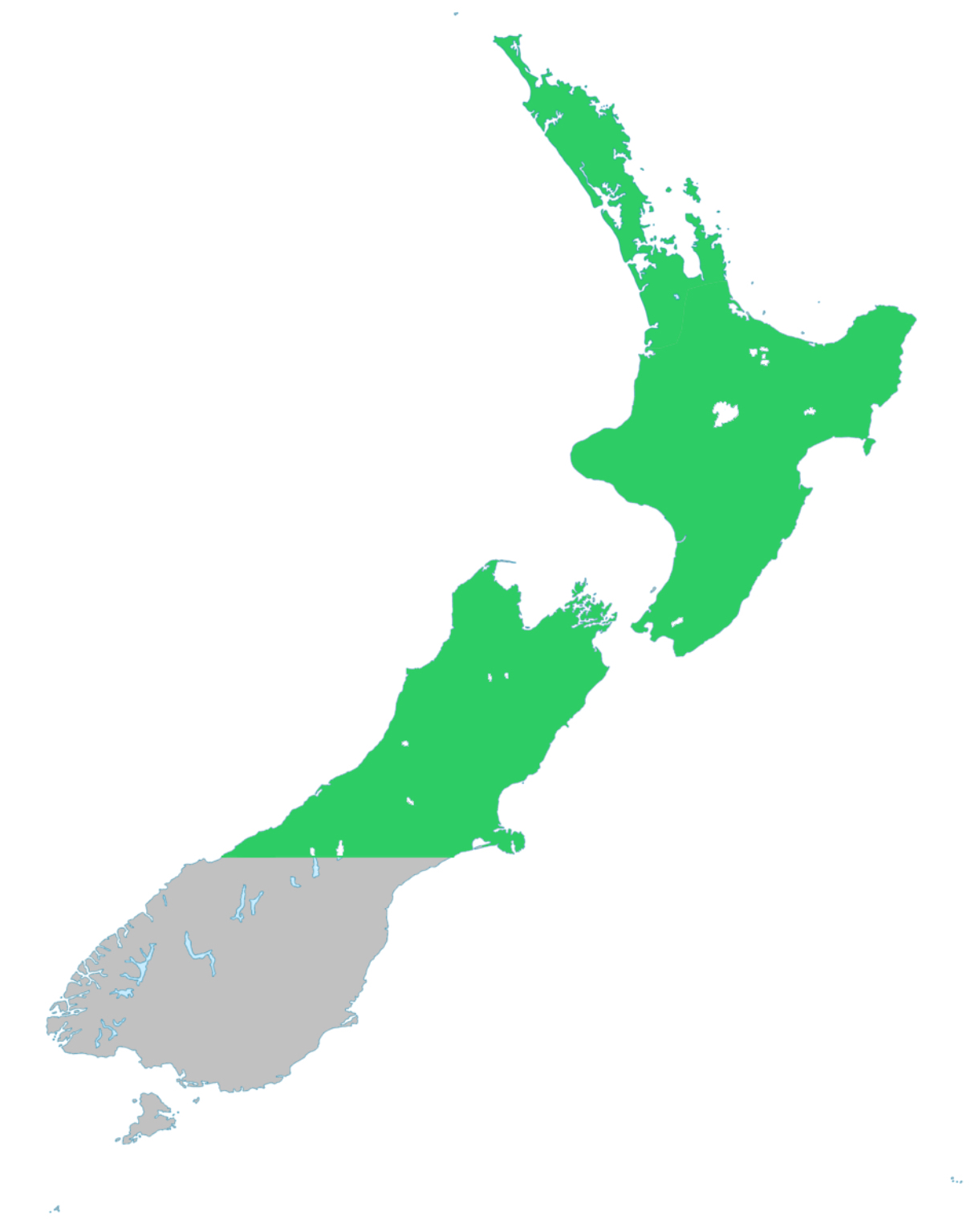
- Natural range of Hīnau

Synonyms
- Dicera dentata J.R.Forst. et G.Forst.; Elaeocarpus hinau A.Cunn.; Elaeocarpus cunninghamii Raoul

= Elaeocarpus dentatus =

Species of flowering plant

Elaeocarpus dentatus, commonly known as hinau (Māori: hīnau), is a native lowland forest tree of New Zealand. Other names in Māori for the tree are hangehange, pōkākā, and whīnau.

A member of the family Elaeocarpaceae, it is found on both the North and South Islands of New Zealand, but not on Stewart Island. The leaves are dark green, with a toothed edge. On the underside of the leaf, small domatia are present. Clusters of small white flowers are produced in spring, and in late summer the flowers form into a fleshy fruit.

It was officially first recorded for science by botanists Joseph Banks and Daniel Solander on 5 November 1769.

== Description ==
E. dentatus is a tree which reaches a height of around 18 m (59 ft.) and has a trunk of around 1 m (3.2 ft.) in diameter with greyish bark which roughens with age. The sapwood is white and the heartwood is dark brown. The latter, being heavy and strong, is used for making fence posts though is rarely milled because it is often hollow inside. It has leathery leaves which are 10–12 cm (3.9–4.7 in) long and 2–3 cm (0.8–1.2 in) wide. On top they are a dark green and an off-white colour below.

It flowers from October to February with flowers very similar to the lily of the valley extending off of 10–18 cm long racemes, each one bearing 8–10 flowers. The flowers (around 12mm in diameter) are white and droop down, connected to the raceme by 1 cm long silky pedicels. They are made of 3–5 petals which are lobed at their tips and have long anthers which extend out on short filaments. The sepals are covered with many tiny hairs. E. dentatus has 15 pairs of chromosomes (2n = 30) and is bisexual, meaning its flowers contain both the male (stamen) and female (carpel) parts.

It fruits from December through to when it ripens in May. The fruit are purple-black egg-shaped drupes which are 12–18 mm long and 9 mm wide and are attractive to birds. It has 2-celled ovaries and a rugulose (wrinkly) endocarp. The drupes are very fleshy, the flesh making up 56% of the mass, and have a relatively low level of water at 66%. They have a mean mass of 1.05g and have the following compositional breakdown (after moisture is removed): 69.9% N.F.E (Soluble carbohydrates), 21.8% Crude Fiber, 3.4% Crude protein, 3.2% Ash, and 1.7% Lipid.

It is very similar to Elaeocarpus hookerianus but can be distinguished by its larger leaves, flowers and fruit, and its lack of E. hookerianus's distinctive divaricating juvenile to sub-adult form.

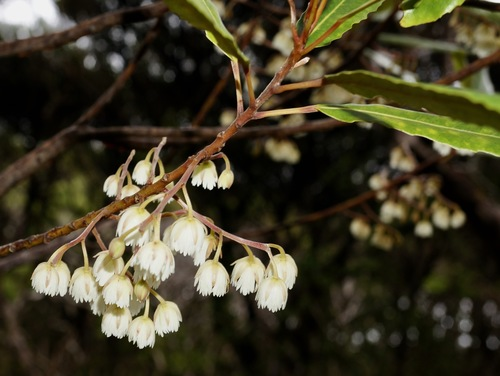
Hinau flowers

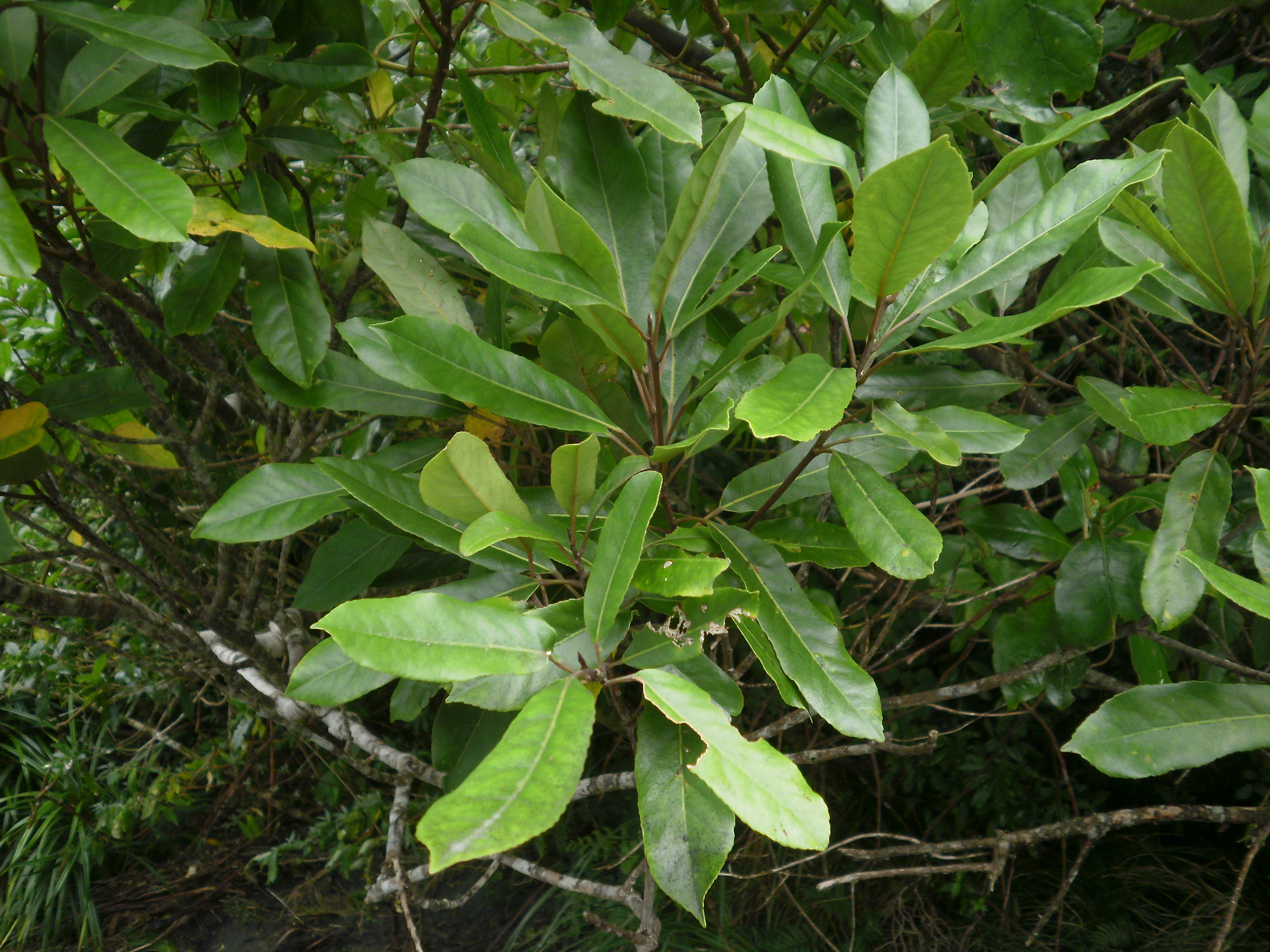
Hinau foliage

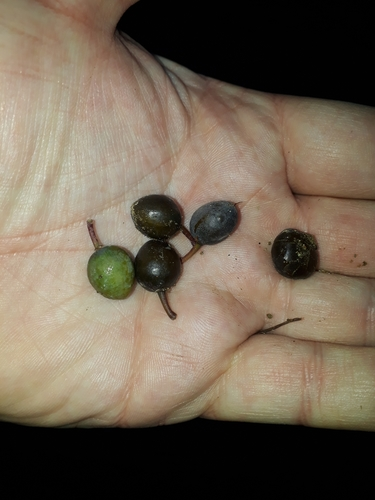
Hinau drupes (fruit)

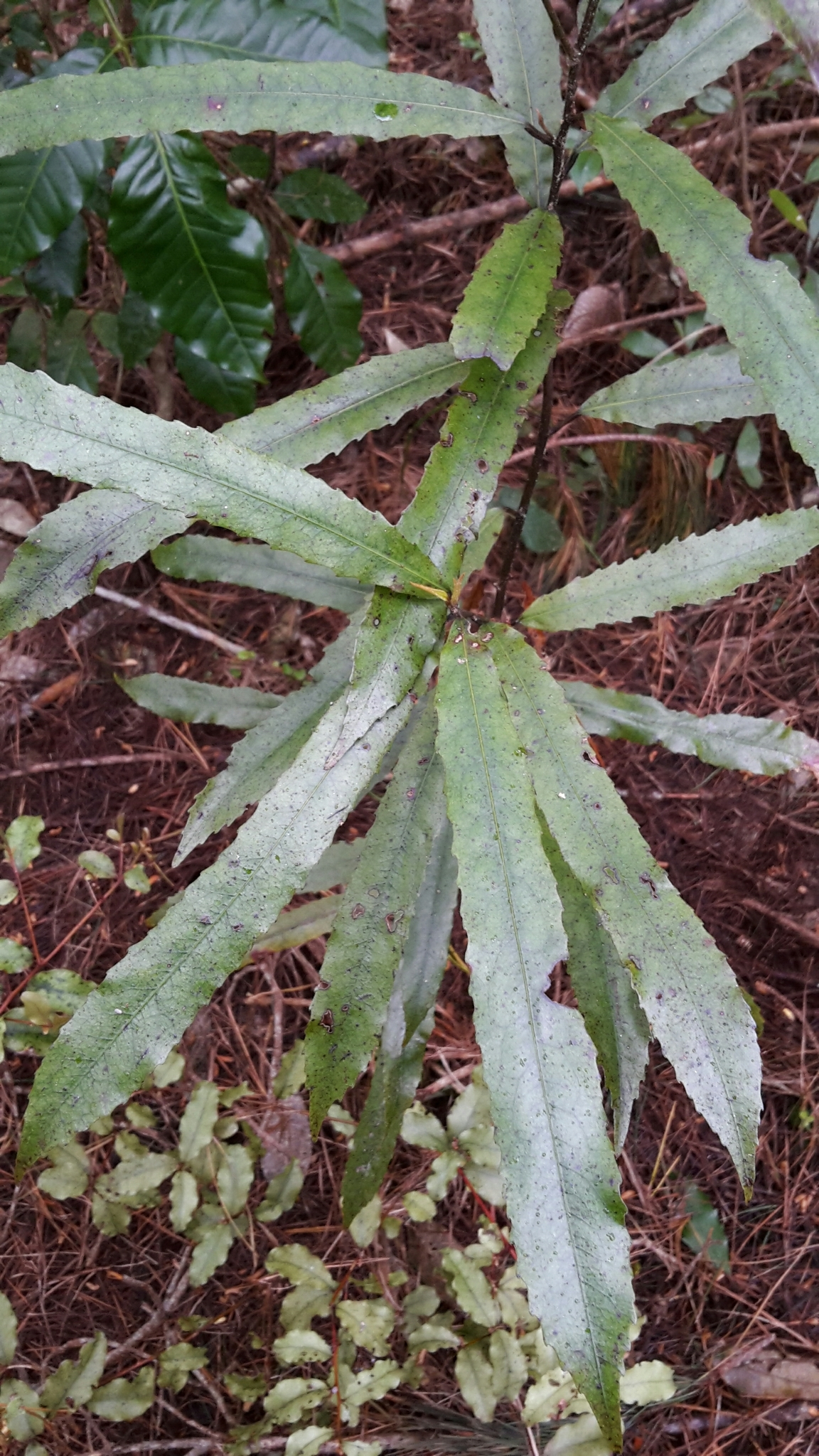
Juvenile foliage

== Taxonomy ==
The Obovatus variety

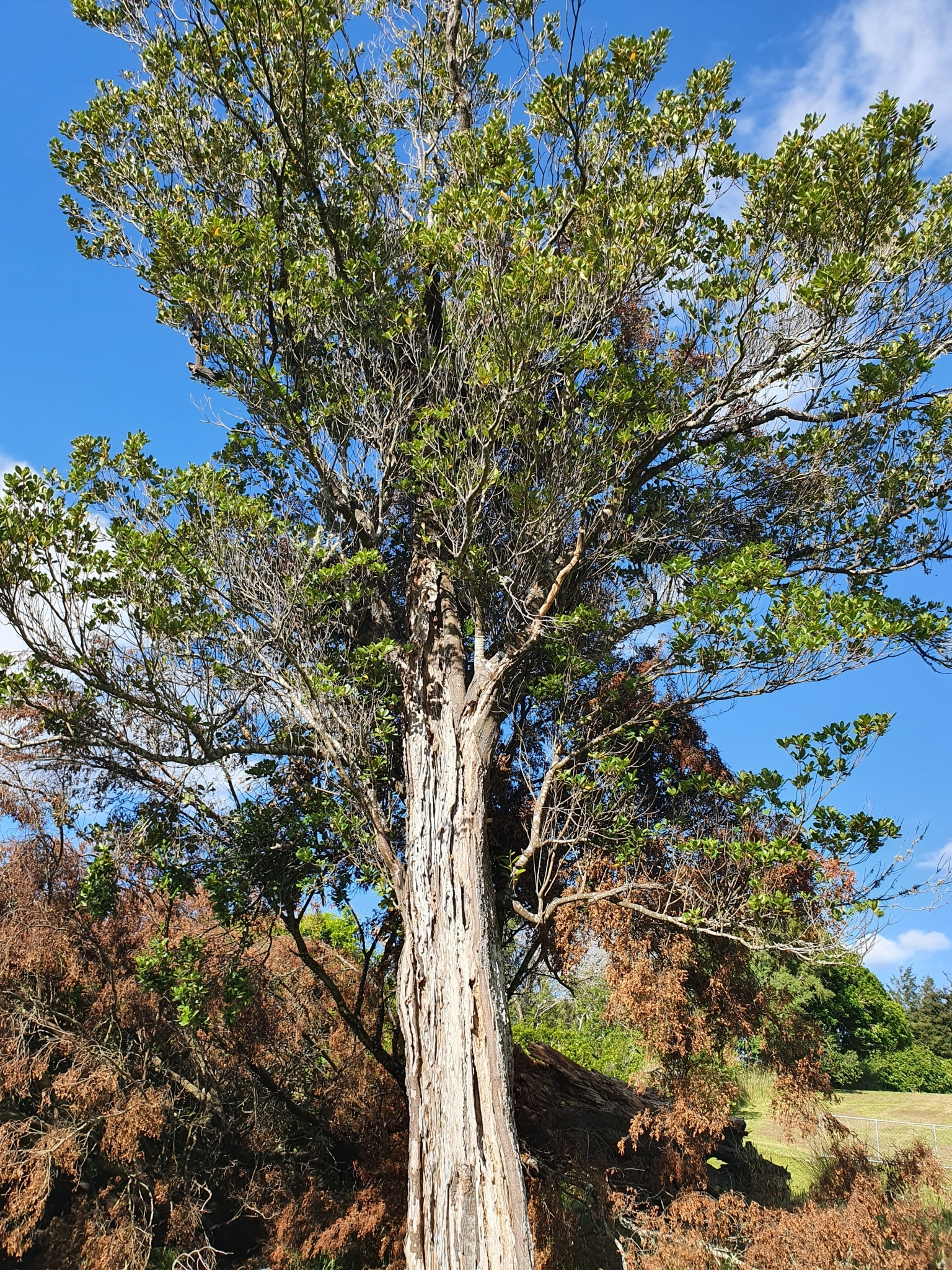
E. d. var. obovatus

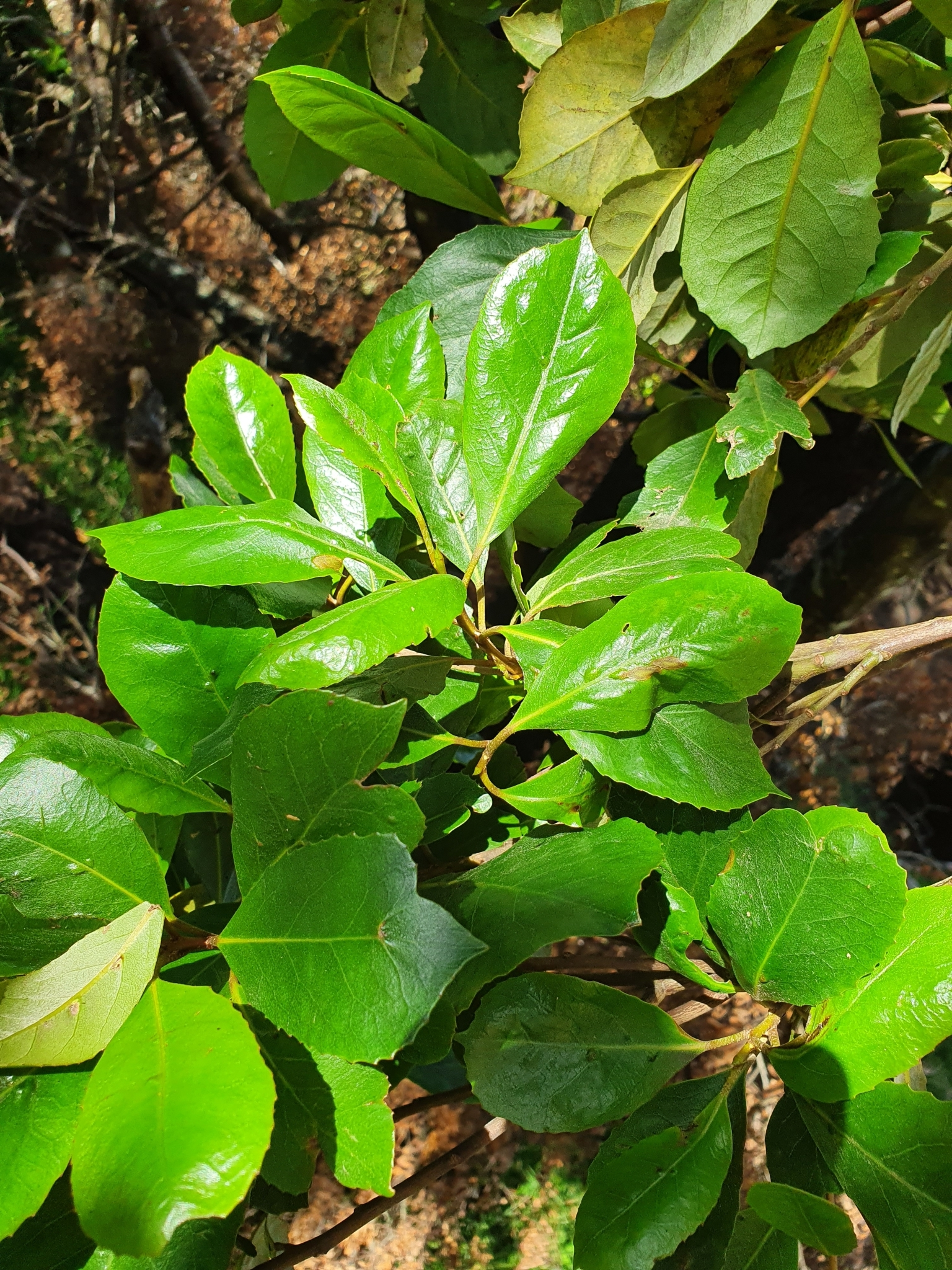
E. d. var. obovatus foliage

Elaeocarpus dentatus was first described by the German botanists Georg and Johann Forster in their 1779 Characteres Generum Plantarum as Dicera dentata, one of two species in their genus Dicera; (Note: The other being Dicera serrata (Wineberry), which is now called Aristotelia serrata.) he did not designate a type specimen. It was renamed Elaeocarpus dentatus by the Danish-Norwegian botanist Martin Vahl in the third edition of his Symbolæ Botanicæ, published in 1794. The British botanist Allan Cunningham renamed it superfluously to Elaeocarpus hinau in 1840, in an article in the Annals of Natural History, as did the French Botanist Étienne Raoul in his 1846 Choix de Plantes de la Nouvelle-Zélande ("Selected plants of New Zealand"), this time to Elaeocarpus cunninghamii. (Note: He originally spelt it with just one i.)

=== Varieties ===
The New Zealand botanist Thomas Cheeseman described a variety of E. dentatus in an article in the 1907 issue of the Transactions and proceedings of the New Zealand Institute. Naming it Elaeocarpus dentatus var. obovatus, he described how, though E. dentatus is variable, he had "never seen specimens with leaves so broad and ovate." This variety is recognised by the New Zealand Plant Conservation Network, New Zealand flora, as well as in Harry Allan's 1961 The flora of New Zealand. As such, they describe two varieties: E. dentatus var. dentatus, the nominate variety, as well as E. dentatus var. obovatus, the variety with wider leaves. It was not accepted, however, by Anthony Peter Druce in his unpublished 1993 Indigenous vascular plants of New Zealand. It is listed as a synonym of Elaeocarpus dentatus by both The Plant List and World Flora Online, which superseded it. The variety was mentioned in a Department of Conservation Conservation Status Report published in 2017, under the heading: "Data Deficient."

E. dentatus var. obovatus has much wider leaves than the nominate variety, reaching 5–7 cm in length and 3–5 cm in width. The leaves have pits on their undersides and tiny teeth along their edges. Though the adult leaves are wide, they shrink down to thin petioles (leaf stems), and juvenile leaves are also much more narrow. E. d. var. obovatus produces white flowers on racemes, and later purple oval-shaped fruit, that are between 12 and 15 mm long.

=== Phylogeny ===
A 2015 thesis established through DNA sequencing that E. dentatus evolved from the same ancestor as E. hookerianus, which is shown in the cladogram below. They likely split off from their ancestor 13.13 mya, which reached New Zealand through long-distance dispersal, similar to other plants.

- - Hīnau (Elaeocarpus dentatus)
  - Pōkākā (Elaeocarpus hookerianus)

=== Etymology ===
The name of its genus, Elaeocarpus, comes from the Latin elaeocarpus meaning olive-seed; and the specific epithet dentatus, from the Latin dentatus meaning toothed, referring to the tree's serrated leaves. The epithet obovatus combines the Latin prefix ob, meaning reverse or against, and ovatus, meaning shaped like an egg, since the leaves get wider towards the top rather than the bottom.

The Māori language name hīnau does not appear to have any cognates in other Pacific languages, and is likely a name that originated in New Zealand. Early English language names for the tree include New Zealand olive, and lily of the valley tree, the latter chosen due to the similarity of the flowers.

== Ecology ==
The fruit are eaten off the ground by North Island brown kiwi (Apteryx mantelli) who use the seeds as grinding agents to help break down food in their gizzards. To kākā on Kapiti Island, the drupes are an important food source especially in March and, for males, from March all the way until June. This is thought to be because of the different shaped mandible which females have as the fruit actually harden in the months following March, meaning the females are unable to break into them to get at the developing seed, the part that kākā eat. Kākā also rely heavily on hinau and tawa trees to feed their young, both because of their prevalence on the island and their abundant crop of fruit. Weka (Gallirallus australis) eat the fruit which falls onto the ground and are thought to be very important dispersers after the extinction of many of New Zealand's other flightless birds. Hinau seeds may also germinate better after the coat has been torn open and the weka's gizzard might have a similar effect, though more research is needed. Kōkako eat both the leaves and fruit, though they make up a very small proportion of the bird's varied and complex diet. The extremely hard endocarp is thought to be for protection inside the digestive systems of large flightless birds who acted as another disperser by eating fallen fruit. It is also possible, however, that it is to balance the over-eating of their fruit by parrots, like the kākā, who have been found digesting an average of 7.1 seeds per minute in March. Kererū also eat the fruit and act as a disperser, though not to the degree weka do.

In New Zealand forests, the trunks of trees are crucial to flightless invertebrates who use them as a way to reach the canopy for food and breeding. One study which trapped these invertebrates coming up and down hinau trees found that the most prevalent species coming up were springtails, followed by wasps and ants, spiders, beetles and weevils and mites. Coming down the trunk, the most common were the mites, making up 15%, followed by larvae, springtails, and harvestmen.

== Distribution ==
E. dentatus is endemic to New Zealand and found in both the North and South Islands down to South Westland and Christchurch on the east and west. It grows from sea level to 600 m (1970 ft.), essentially anywhere north of the latitude 43˚30'S.

== In Māori culture ==
=== Mythology ===
In Māori mythology Māui discovers the origin of fire by stealing the nails of his grandmother Mahuika, the atua (God) of fire, extinguishing each one. After realising that Māui had taken all of her fire she threw her last nail at him. It missed and landed first in the Rata (all species under NZ), Hīnau, Kahikatea, Rimu, Mataī, and Miro trees who rejected the fire. It then went on, landing in the kaikōmako, tōtara, patete, pukatea, and māhoe trees who received the fire, considering it a great gift. The trees that accepted the fire can be used to create fire by rubbing dry sticks together, those that do not, like the Hīnau, will not produce fire in this way.

Māori traditional beliefs often associated hīnau trees with the ability to grant life, help fertility and determine the sex of babies.

=== Food ===
The mealy substance which covers the kernel of the hinau's drupe (similar to that of an Olive) was used by Māori to make a kind of cake or bread or, alternatively, a kind of gruel.

The ethnographer Elsdon Best recorded that, though the drupes are edible raw, to make the cake they would first dry the fruit for a couple of days and then pound them with a pestle made of maire or stone. This process, called tuki, was done in a trough called a kumete, and was necessary in order to remove the unwanted nuts, stalks and bits of broken skin. The meal was then sifted through baskets make of Cabbage tree leaves such that the stones were trapped in the basket, known as a tatari or kete puputu. They were then sieved through a finer sieve to ensure that none of the stones known as karihi, iwi, or iho were left in the meal. Afterwards, the meal was moulded into a large cake which was then cooked for several hours in what he described as a steam oven, likely a hāngī, inside wooden baskets called rourou, which were lined with Hound's tongue ferns, in which the meal was also wrapped. Because some meal was still left on the stones, water was used to rub it off and the combination was drunk as a sort of gruel, as it would be called in a western context, and known to Māori as wai haro. He also reported that it was usually drunk heated, by placing hot stones into it. The cakes, 9-13 kg in weight, would take 1–2 days of cooking to be prepared.

William Colenso in 1880 described the process as being different depending on iwi: some iwi would steep the fruit in water, while others would pound and sift the fruit without a steeping stage. Another 19th century ethnographer, Richard Taylor, described a similar process, though he recorded that the drupes were steeped in running water for a year to remove their "bitterness" and cooked wrapped inside a rangiora leaf. An alternative cooking method he described involved placing the "flour" in heated water at which point it was described as rerepi. Mākereti Papakura, another ethnographer from the time period also described the fruit being soaked, though she didn't record it being a year long process.

Although some Europeans did not particularly enjoy the cakes, Elsdon Best writing that "I prefer my bread and beefsteak," Mākereti Papakura claimed that Māori considered it a great luxury as demonstrated in their saying: "Kia whakaara koe i taku moe, ko te whatu turei a Rua" meaning "When you awaken me from my sleep let it be for the purpose of eating the whatu turei a Rua (Hīnau meal).

E. dentatus's fruit are in fact nutritious as they contain some fatty acids which may be protective against Cardiovascular disease.

=== Dye and other uses ===
The bark produces a brown dye which, when dipped in a ferruginous swamp (one containing iron), turns it into a bright and durable black colour. The dye had many traditional uses, including as an ink for tā moko and for dyeing harakeke for weaving.

Young seedlings were tied with a knot and left to grow into the shape of a walking stick. They were then cut and used as such. The bark was used to make bags which served various purposes, such as for the preparation of raupō pollen bread.

Timber from the tree traditionally had a variety of uses, including for palisades, tools, spears. Early European settlers used the timber for bridge construction, furniture-making, and to construct houses and boats.

== Cultivation ==
E. dentatus prefers a rich, moist soil in partial shade. To grow, press the seed well in and cover with 5mm of soil. It takes around 6 months to germinate and fresh fruit can be used.
