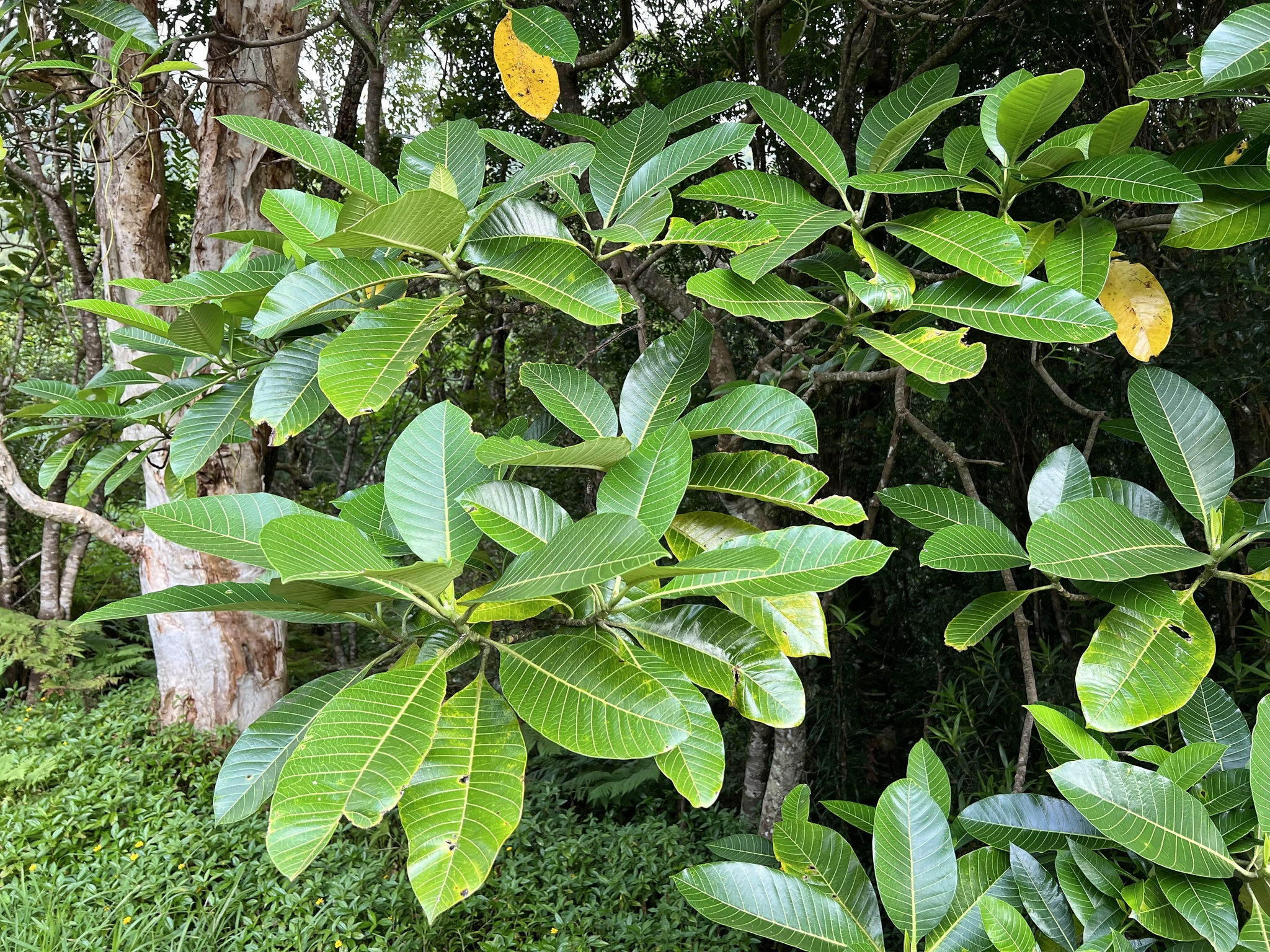
- In New Caledonia

Conservation status
- Least Concern (IUCN 3.1)

Scientific classification
- Kingdom: Plantae
- Clade: Embryophytes
- Clade: Tracheophytes
- Clade: Angiosperms
- Clade: Eudicots
- Clade: Asterids
- Order: Gentianales
- Family: Apocynaceae
- Genus: Alstonia
- Species: A. costata

Binomial name
- Alstonia costata (G.Forst.) R.Br.

Synonyms
- Alstonia costata Jeann., nom. illeg.; Alstonia elliptica J.W.Moore; Alstonia fragrans J.W.Moore; Alstonia godeffroyi Reinecke; Alstonia marquisensis M.L.Grant ex Fosberg & Sachet; Alstonia montana Turrill; Alstonia plumosa Labill.; Alstonia reineckeana Lauterb.; Alstonia roeperi Van Heurck & Müll.Arg.; Alstonia setchelliana Christoph.; Alstonia smithii Markgr.; Alstonia villosa Seem., nom. illeg.; Alstonia vitiensis Seem.; Echites costatus G.Forst.

= Alstonia costata =

Species of plant

Alstonia costata, synonyms including Alstonia marquisensis, is a species of flowering plant in the family Apocynaceae, native to the Solomon Islands in Papuasia and to islands in the south Pacific. It was first described by Georg Forster in 1786 as Echites costatus. It grows as a shrub or tree.

== Distribution ==
Alstonia costata is native to the Solomon Islands in Papuasia; the Cook Islands, the Marquesas Islands and the Society Islands in the south-central Pacific; and Fiji, New Caledonia, Samoa, the Santa Cruz Islands, Tonga, and Vanuatu in the south-western Pacific.
