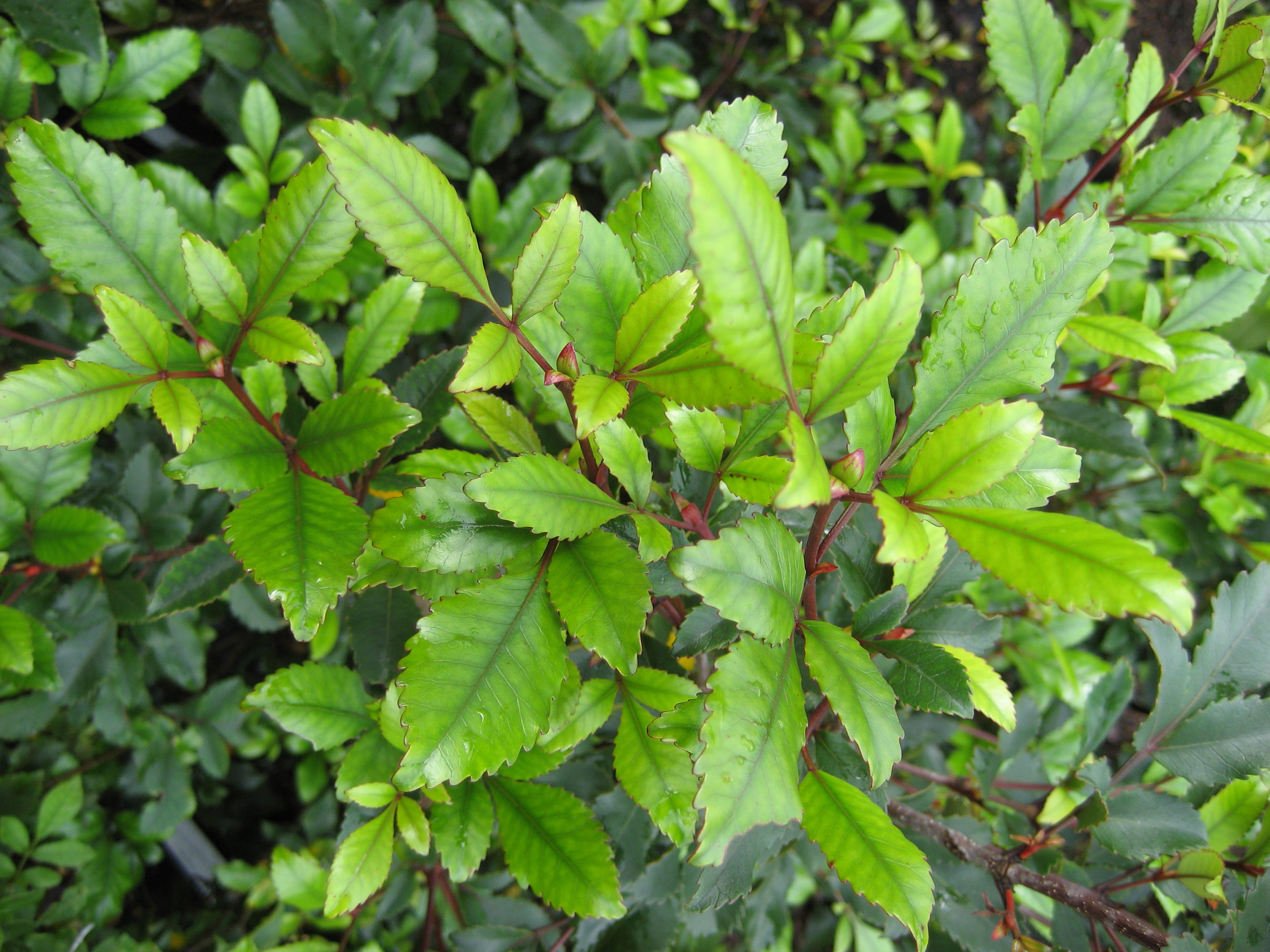

Conservation status
- Least Concern (IUCN 3.1)

Scientific classification
- Kingdom: Plantae
- Clade: Tracheophytes
- Clade: Angiosperms
- Clade: Eudicots
- Clade: Rosids
- Order: Oxalidales
- Family: Cunoniaceae
- Genus: Pterophylla
- Species: P. racemosa

Binomial name
- Pterophylla racemosa (L.f.) Pillon & H.C.Hopkins (2021)

Synonyms
- Leiospermum racemosum (L.f.) D.Don (1830); Weinmannia racemosa L.f. (1782); Weinmannia speciosa Banks & Sol. ex A.Cunn. (1839); Windmannia racemosa (L.f.) Kuntze (1891)

= Pterophylla racemosa =

Kāmahi

Species of tree endemic to New Zealand

Pterophylla racemosa, commonly known as the kāmahi, is an evergreen tree endemic to New Zealand. It is a member of the Cunoniaceae family of plants, and it is often referred to by its former botanical name Weinmannia racemosa.

Most members of the Cunoniaceae are native to tropical wet parts of the Southern Hemisphere, with the majority of Pterophylla species being native to either Malesia and Papuasia or to Madagascar; however, two Pterophylla species are endemic to New Zealand: Pterophylla racemosa, and Pterophylla sylvicola. Whilst P. sylvicola is restricted to subtropical forests in the far north of North Island, P. racemosa is found growing across vast areas of the country as far south as Stewart Island and is found in a variety of climatic conditions from mild coastal areas to mountainous (sub)-alpine areas inland.

The abundance of the kāmahi (P. racemosa) across New Zealand has led to it long being described as the common tree in the country.

== Description ==
A very common tree throughout New Zealand, kāmahi is evergreen that grows up to 25 m in height (rarely higher) with a trunk up to 24 cm (Wardle & MacRae, 1966). The tree has dark green leathery leaves approximately 7.5 cm long and 4 cm wide. It produces masses of creamy flowers between October and March which have a sweet, scented smell. The flowers form in erect spikes like clusters and are highly attractive to a range of insects and birds.

== Distribution and habitat ==
Kāmahi is native to New Zealand although the genus Pterophylla has a more widespread distribution in Madagascar, Malesia, and the southwest Pacific. Most species of this genus are tropical or sub-tropical. In New Zealand, however, kāmahi is found south in colder climate such as alpine terrain.

Kāmahi appears in lowland, montane, and subalpine forests and shrubland from central North Island south to Stewart Island.

Kāmahi's habitat is coastal to subalpine. It is very commonly widespread in coastal, lowland and montane forest, often becoming dominant in higher elevation montane forest in the higher areas of the North Island and western South Island.

== Life cycle ==
Kāmahi is durable, hardy, and persistent meaning it will grow in most situations. Kāmahi often starts life as a dense shrub; however, given the space, it can develop into a hulking tree that grows erratically. The white candle-like flowers that bloom in spring open to release fine seeds to be blown in the wind. Spreading their seed easily in spring. It is a slow growing plant that takes time to establish roots, however, once established, they will grow to 25 m at their best.

== Ecology ==
Kāmahi prefers well drained sites and tolerates infertile soil reasonably well. It is found on hillslopes, roadside cuttings and can even start out life perched on the trunks of tree ferns. It has medium water requirements, preferring the soil to become dry between waterings. Kāmahi enjoys free draining soil which is suited to silt and sand-based soil, although it is accepted that this tree does not necessarily need particular climates and it is an adaptable plant that grows in diverse areas.

Kāmahi flowers in spring and bees use its nectar for honey. Plenty of insects and other invertebrates use the trees to feed off and move around. A study in the Ōrongorongo Valley forest near Wellington called “Invertebrate fauna of four tree species in Ōrongorongo valley, New Zealand, as revealed by truck traps” discovered that tree trunks provide an important pathway (especially at night) for many ground-living invertebrates that move from the forest floor to feed or breed on tree stems and in the canopy.

The Department of Conservation are monitoring a kāmahi forest on the Kaitake Range. This investigation brings up the problem of possums and the damage they do to kāmahi trees. Their results showed how possums were damaging the trees from the canopy to the ground floor. This shows that one of the threats to kāmahi are introduced species. Kāmahi have not adapted and have very little protection against invaders. However, with kāmahi being a very common tree throughout New Zealand, possums should not pose much of a threat to the species.

== Fruit ==
The fruit is about 5mm in diameter. The berries are not edible according to Crowe, the main authority on New Zealand edibles. He said the first error probably started with the confusion with tawa, which has a similar Māori name. He does not, however, say it is actually poisonous and it has not found out if it is anywhere (Nicholls, 2000). It was, however, very valuable to Māori for other uses (see below).

== In human culture ==
Before the arrival of Europeans, kāmahi was valuable to Māori and because of this, it was protected by tapu (spiritual restriction, means that kāmahi was almost sacred to Māori). Back when the land was being transformed by Māori and being set up for cultivation, there are legends that say Māori were careful not to cut down all the tree's limbs, if they did they or their spouse may suffer unfortunate consequences.

Kāmahi bark is a rich source of tannins and a reddish, permanent dye can be obtained by boiling and soaking the bark. It was historically used by some Māori to dye cloaks and mats and was considered to have a preservative effect on fishing lines. Following the arrival of Europeans to New Zealand, Kāmahi-based dyes were exported during the 1800s.

== Medical uses ==
Inner bark is a purgative decoction. "Bark from west side of the tree, from which the outer rind has been scraped off, is steeped in hot water and the decoction taken internally as an aperient in cases of abdominal and thoracic pain". Bark infused in boiling water is a good tonic. Inner bark is also a laxative.

== Gallery ==
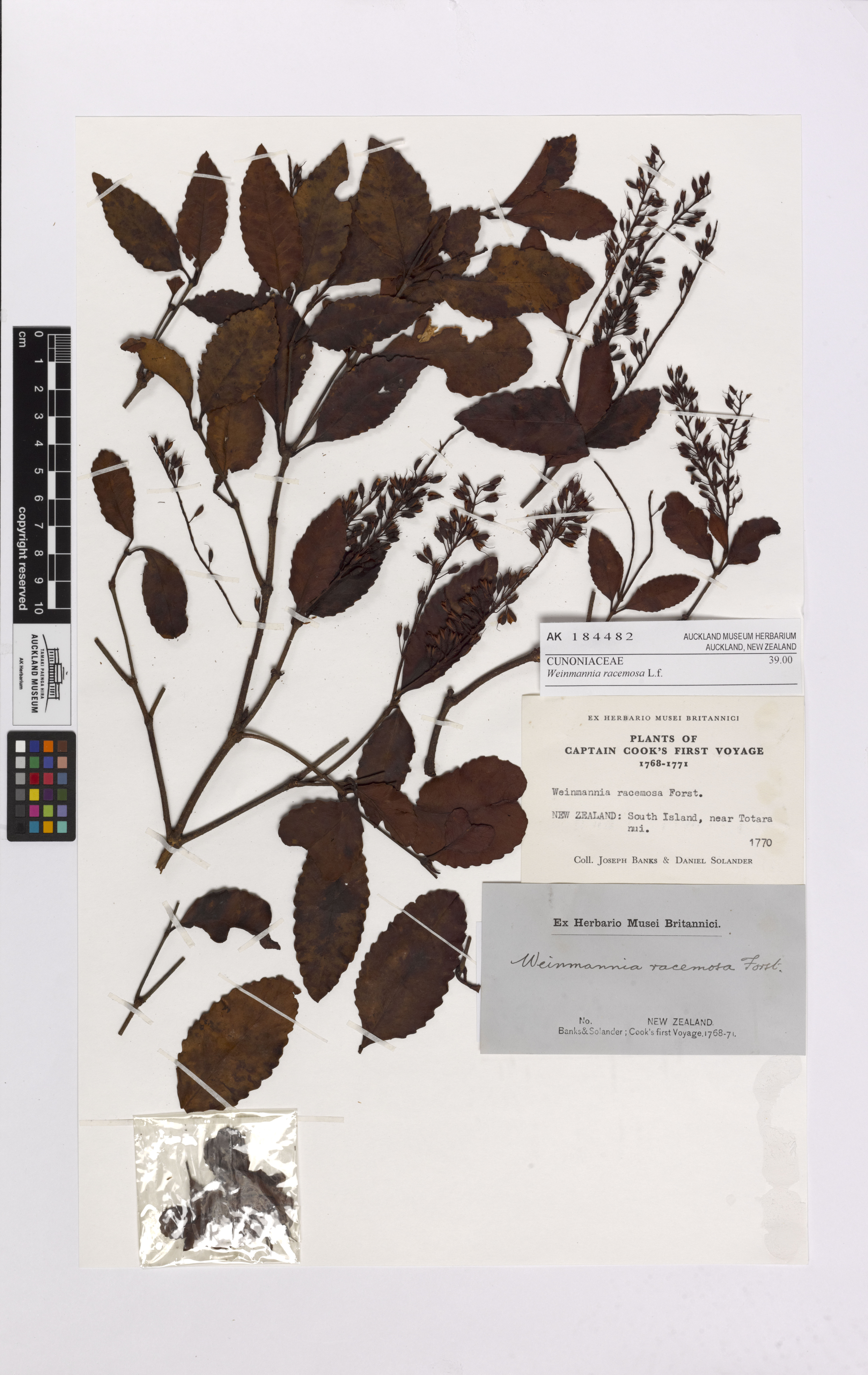
Herbarium specimen

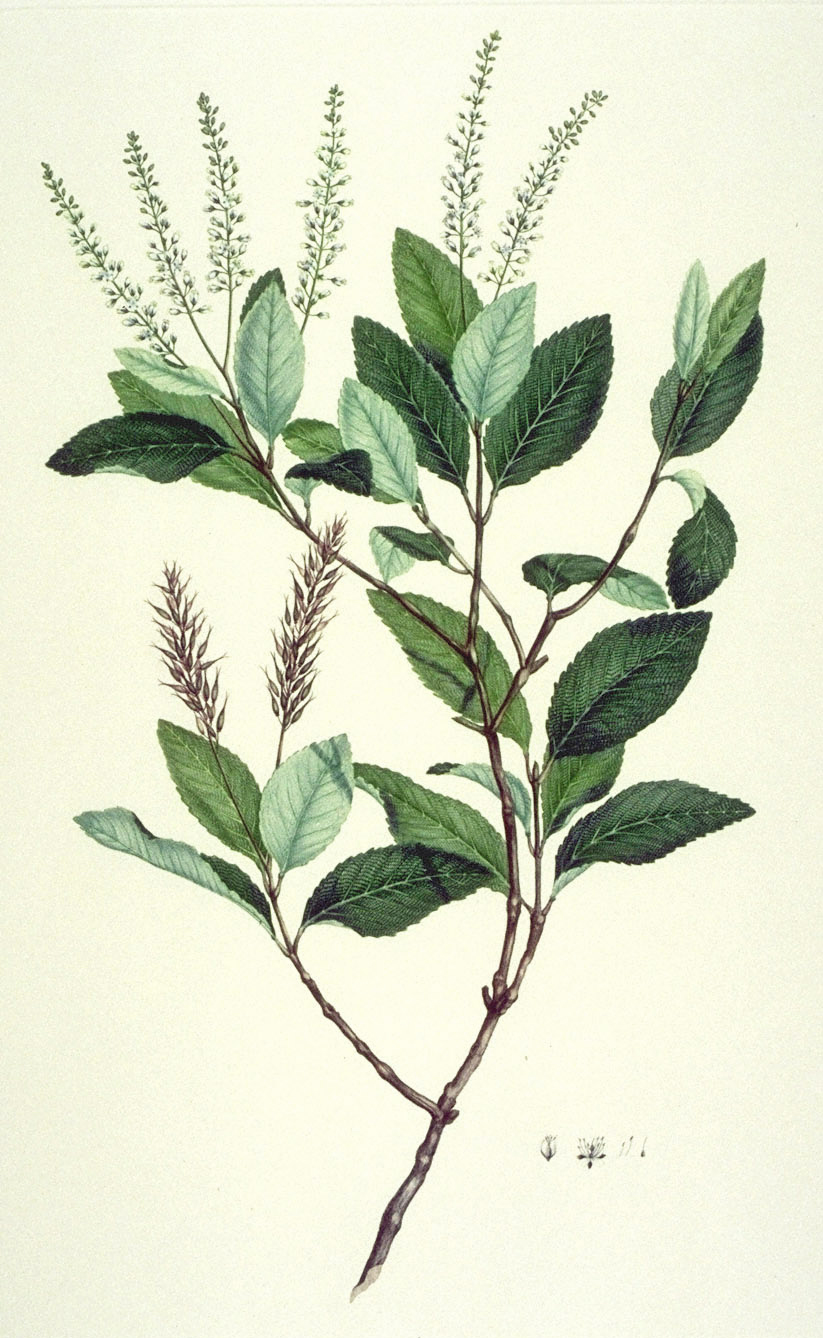
Botanical illustration

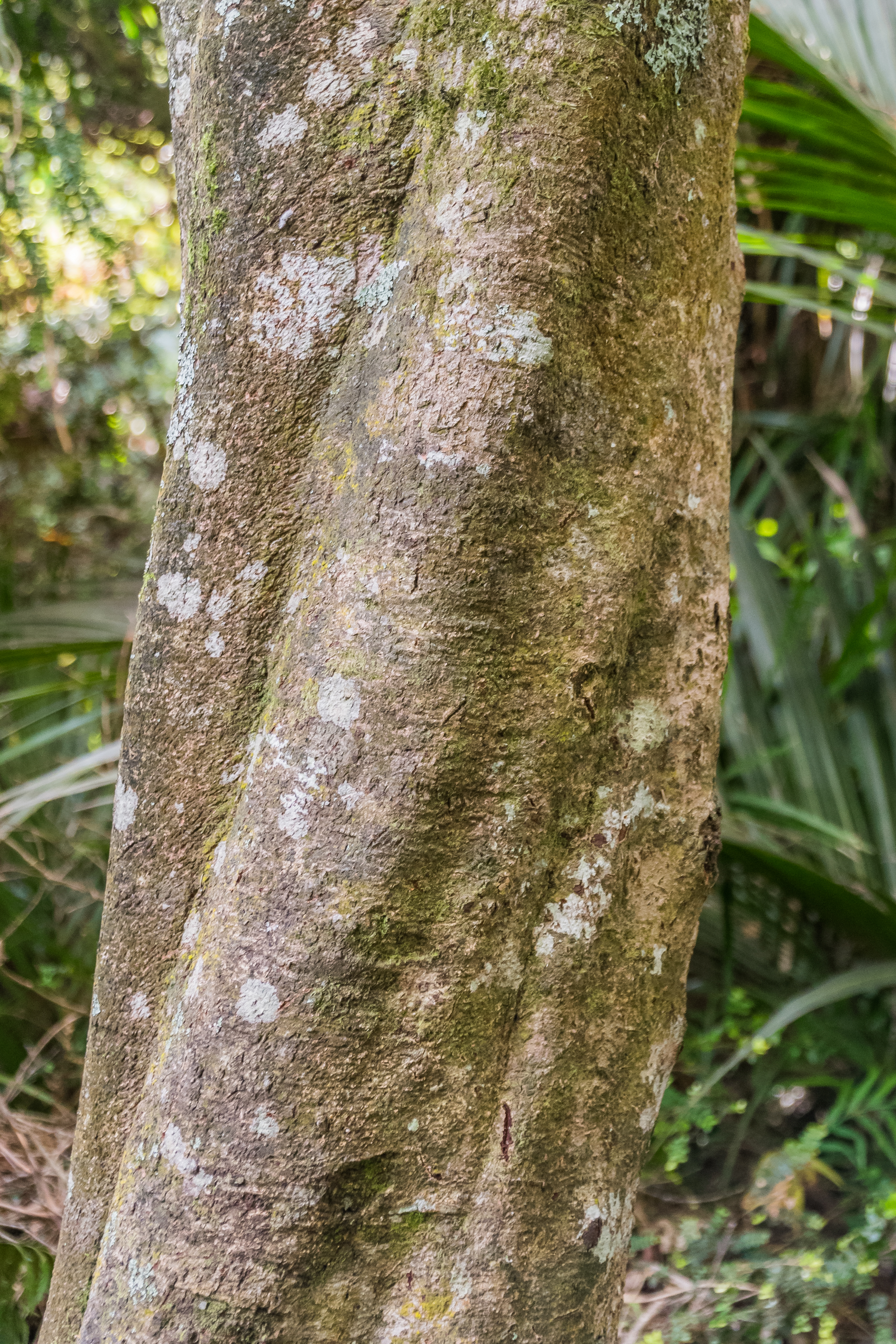
Trunk

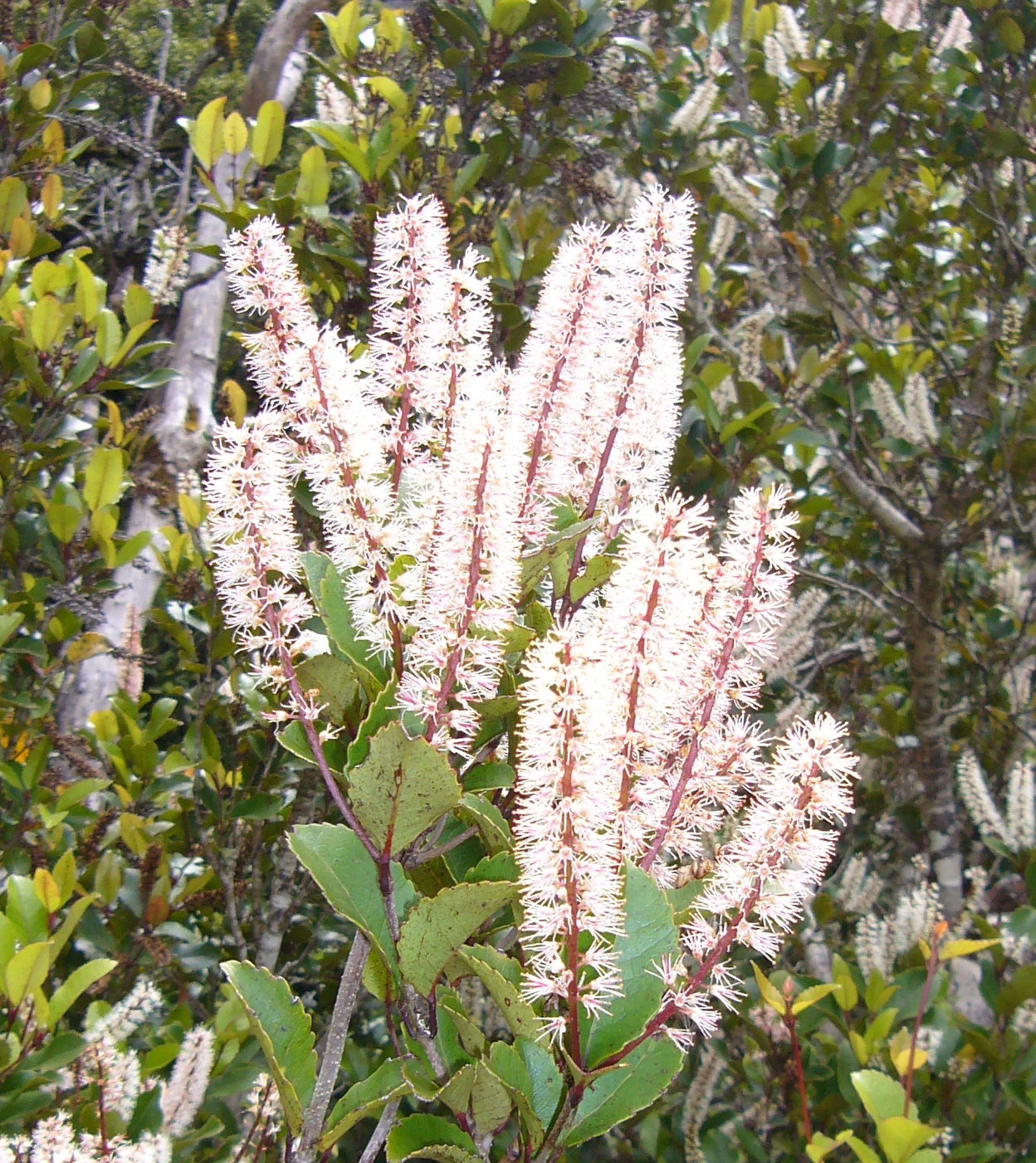
Flowers

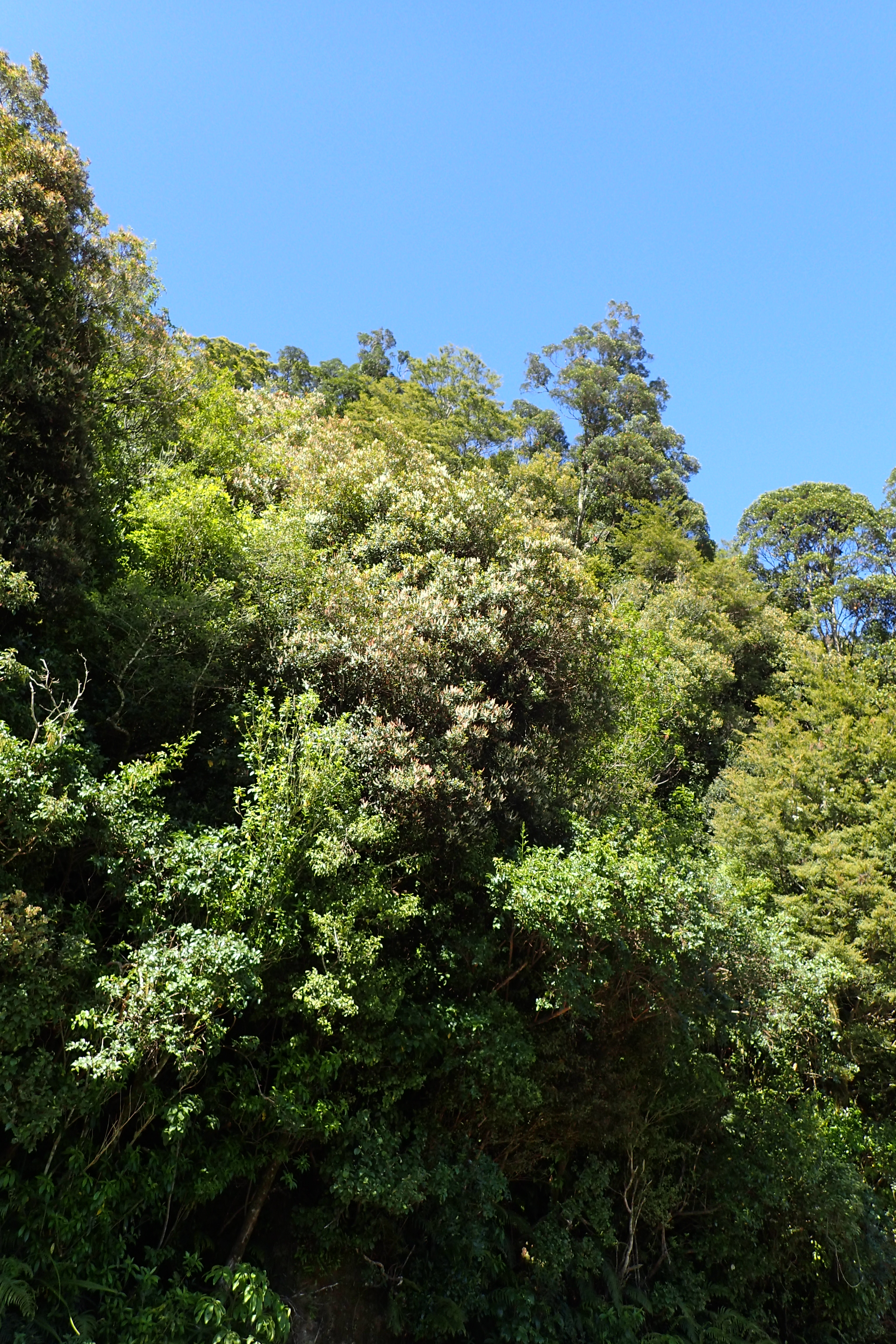
Pterophylla racemosa tree in Haast
