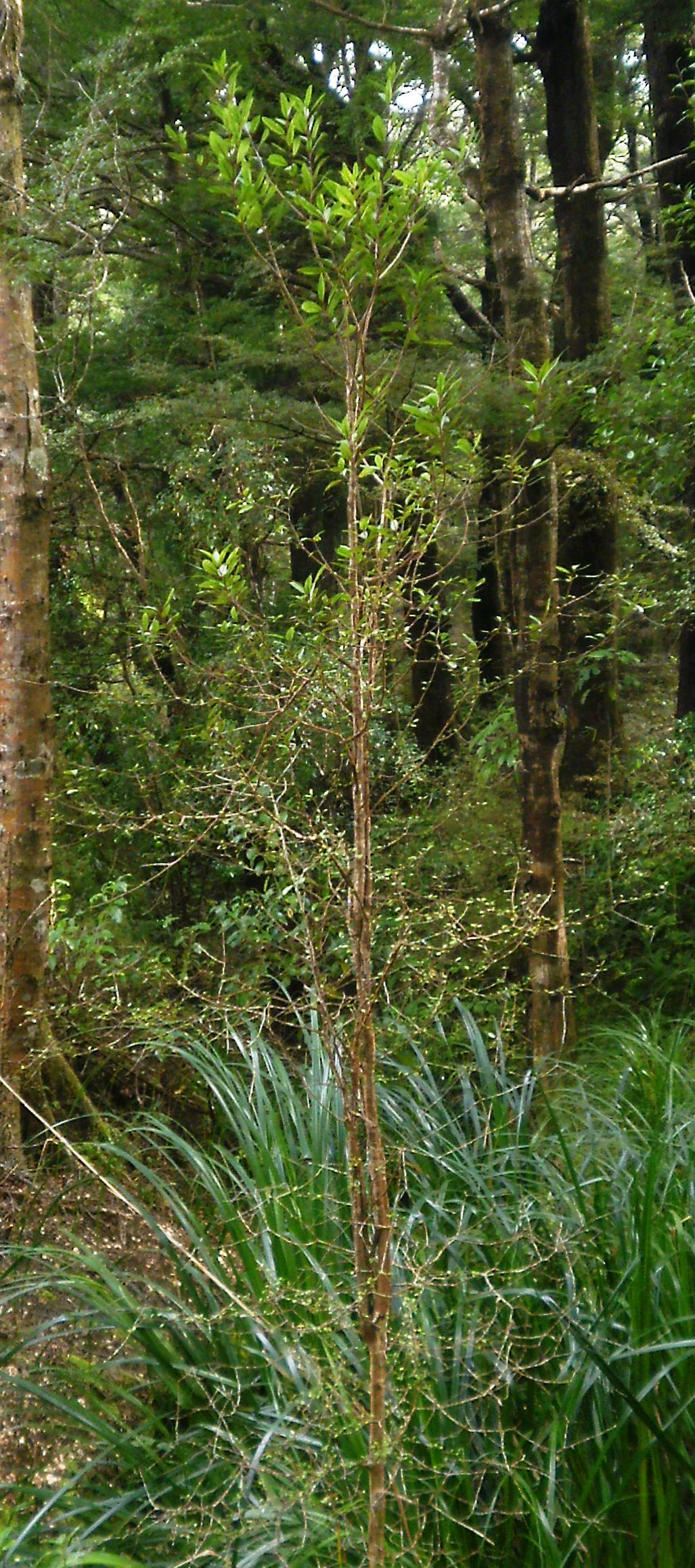
- Pōkākā with juvenile foliage at the base and adult leaves near the top

Scientific classification
- Kingdom: Plantae
- Clade: Tracheophytes
- Clade: Angiosperms
- Clade: Eudicots
- Clade: Rosids
- Order: Oxalidales
- Family: Elaeocarpaceae
- Genus: Elaeocarpus
- Species: E. hookerianus

Binomial name
- Elaeocarpus hookerianus Raoul

= Elaeocarpus hookerianus =

Species of flowering plant

Elaeocarpus hookerianus, commonly known as pokaka (Māori: pōkākā), is a native forest tree of New Zealand. A cold tolerant plant, E. hookerianus can be found from valley floors to mountainous areas.

Like many other New Zealand trees it has a distinctive juvenile form where its branches are interlaced and have tiny leaves.
