= Proto-Philippine language =

Reconstructed ancestor of the Philippine languages

Proto-Philippine
- Reconstruction of: Philippine languages
- Region: Philippines
- Reconstructed ancestors: Proto-Austronesian: Proto-Malayo-Polynesian
- Lower-order reconstructions: Proto-Batanic; Proto-Northern Luzon; Proto-Central Luzon; Proto-Greater Central Philippine; Proto-South Mindanao; Proto-Minahasan; Proto-Sangiric

The Proto-Philippine language is a reconstructed ancestral proto-language of the Philippine languages, a proposed subgroup of the Austronesian languages which includes all languages within the Philippines (except for the Sama–Bajaw languages) as well as those within the northern portions of Sulawesi in Indonesia. Proto-Philippine is not directly attested to in any written work, but linguistic reconstruction by the comparative method has found regular similarities among languages that cannot be explained by coincidence or word-borrowing.

== Classification ==
There have been three initial proposals in delineating the southern boundaries of the Philippine group: Northern Borneo in Malaysia, southern Philippines (encompassing southern Luzon all the way to Mindanao and the Sulu Sea area), and northern Sulawesi in Indonesia. The earliest boundary was proposed by Esser (1938) between the Gorontalo languages and the Tomini languages of Sulawesi. While it was later found decades after (Himmelmann, 1990) that there are shared innovations between Philippine and Tomini languages, there are still uncertainties as to whether the latter do validly form one genetic group, or should be relegated as a mere geographic unit. Meanwhile, Charles (1974) in particular proposed that languages in Sabah and of northern Sarawak are descendants of this Proto-Philippine, which has subsequently garnered counter-evidences (Blust, 1974; Reid, 1982; Zorc, 1986). Lastly, there have been several proposals establishing southern Philippines as the boundary (Thomas & Healey, 1962; Dyen, 1965; Zorc, 1977; 1986) with the "Macro Meso-Philippine" and "Sangiric" as two primary branches. Walton (1979) and McFarland (1980) included the Sama-Bajau group as the third branch, but such has been later disputed as entirely separate directly under Malayo-Polynesian.

== Features ==
Due to issues with the validity of a Philippine genetic group, and thus the existence of an ancestral Proto-Philippine language, most of its features, particularly its phonology, remain as proposals.

=== Phonology ===
==== Llamzon's reconstruction ====
Llamzon's (1975) proposed phonology of Proto-Philippine was derived from earlier reconstructions of Dempwolff's (1934–1938) works by Dyen (1947; 1951; 1953a; 1953b; 1953c). Used in this reconstruction were nine languages—Tagalog, Cebuano, Hiligaynon, Waray, Bikol (Central?), Ilokano, Ibanag, Ifugao, and Kankanaey—with the rationale that the aforementioned have "relatively better structural description and vocabularies" than other related and geographically contiguous languages at that time. While his analysis focused on attested Proto-Austronesian phonemes which were retained in this Proto-Philippine, features that were lost or merged were not highlighted.

Proto-Philippine consonants by Llamzon (1975)
	Labial		Dental/Alveolar		Retroflex	Palatal	Velar		Uvular	Glottal
	Unvoiced	Voiced	Unvoiced	Voiced	Voiced	Voiced	Unvoiced	Voiced	Unvoiced	Unvoiced
Nasal		*m /m/		*n /n/				*ng /ŋ/		
Stop	*p /p/	*b /b/	*t /t/	*d /d/	*D /ɖ/	*j /ɟ/	*k /k/	*g /ɡ/		*q /ʔ/
Affricate						*Z /ɟʝ/				
Fricative			*s /s/							*h /h/
Flap/Tap				*r /ɾ/						
Trill									*R_{134} /ʀ/	
Approximant		*w /w/		*l /l/		*y /j/				

Proto-phonemes *Z and *D were restricted to medial positions, and were not retained in any of the languages.

The proto-phonemes *j and *R are not preserved as such in any Philippine language: *j became either *g or *d (e.g. *púsəj became Ilocano púsəg, Tagalog púsod), whereas *R shifted to *r (e.g. in Ilokano), *l (e.g. in Pangasinan), *g (e.g. in Tagalog) or *y (e.g. in Kapampangan).

PPh vowels by Llamzon (1975)
	Front	Central	Back
Close	*i /i/		*u /u/
Mid		*ə /ə/	
Open		*a /a/	

Proto-Philippine's schwa *ə often merged with other vowels (e.g. /u/ in Cebuano, Hiligaynon, Waray; /a/ in Ibanag, /i/ in Tagalog), but is retained in a diverse range of Philippine languages (e.g. Gaddang, Kinaray-a, Maranao, Maguindanao, Rinconada Bikol, Palawano), and in southern dialects of Ilokano.

Proto-Philippine diphthongs by Llamzon (1975)
*ay	*uy	*aw	*iw

==== Paz' reconstruction ====
Another notable proposal is by Paz (1981) who conducted a bottom-up approach by reconstructing using her own symbols.

Proto-Philippine consonants by Paz (1981)
	Labial		Dental/Alveolar		Retroflex	Palatal	Velar		Glottal
	Unvoiced	Voiced	Unvoiced	Voiced	Voiced	Voiced	Unvoiced	Voiced	Unvoiced
Nasal		m /m/	n /n/					N /ŋ/	
Stop	p /p/	b /b/	t /t/	d /d/	ḍ /ɖ/	g̯ /ɡʲ/	k /k/	g /ɡ/	? /ʔ/
Fricative			s /s/						h /h/
Trill			*r /r/						
Approximant		w /w/	l̩ /l̥/	*l /l/		y /j/			

Paz revisits two types of proto-Austronesian L as part of her reconstruction (l, l̥), which makes it distinct from other reconstructions.

Proto-Philippine vowels by Paz (1981)
Height	Front	Central	Back	Stress
Close	i		u	Vː
Mid		ə		Vː
Open		a		Vː

In comparison to Llamzon, Paz presents five diphthongs instead.

Proto-Philippine diphthongs by Paz (1981)
ay	uy	əy	aw	iw

== Lexicon ==
Below is a table comparing core vocabulary from modern Philippine languages in relation to the following Proto-Philippine innovations. Note that the accented vowels (e.g. á) under Proto-Philippine indicate the stress, while q represents glottal stop.

Proto-Philippine	Tagalog	Ilokano	Kapampangan	Maguindanaon	Visayan group	Gloss
*ásu	aso	aso	asu	asu		dog
*baláy	bahay	balay	bale	waláy	baláy	house
*bábuy	baboy	baboy	babi	babuy	baboy	pig
*baqRu	bago	baro	bayu	bagu	bag-o	new
*báqi	babae	babai	babai	babay	babayi bayi	woman/female
*dəkət	dikít	dekket		deket	dukót	adhesive/(to) stick
*dáRaq		dara	daya	dara		blood
*duRúq	dugô			lugu	dugô	blood
*hajək	halík	agek		alek	halók	(to) kiss
*ŋájan	pangalan ngalan	nagan	ngalan	ngala ngalan	pangalan ngalan ngaran	name
*danúm		danum	danum			water
*túbiR	tubig				tubig	water
*laŋúy	langóy	langóy		langúy	langóy	(to) swim
*táu	tao	tao	tau	taw	tawo	human

Below are selected animal and plant names in Proto-Philippine from the Austronesian Comparative Dictionary.

=== Animal names ===
No.	Common name	Scientific name	Proto-Philippine
9207	fish sp., slipmouth	Leiognathus sp.	*sapsáp
10806	kind of mackerel	Rastrelliger spp.	*tuliŋan
10964	a sea fish, the rudderfish	Kyphosus cinerascens	*hilek
1631	anchovy	Stolephorus spp.	*bulínaw
12682	milkfish	Chanos chanos	*baŋús
11877	parrot fish	Scarus spp.	*mulmúl
9819	kind of water bird, the Oriental darter	Anhinga melanogaster	*kasíli
10671	a bird and its call, probably the tailor bird	Orthotomus atrogularis	*tiwtiw
11077	coconut crab	Birgus latro	*tatus
12348	large marine mollusk	Turbo marmoratus	*RaRaŋ

=== Plant names ===
No.	Common name	Scientific name	Proto-Philippine
9369	a flowering plant	Ixora spp.	*santán
9568	a fruit tree, the pomelo	Citrus decumana	*suháq
2940	a leguminous shrub	Leucaena glauca	*ipil ipil
8957	a palm	Corypha spp.	*silaR
12394	a plant	Acalypha spp.	*abilus
10807	a plant	Astronia spp., Melastomataceae	*tuŋaw₂
11068	a plant	Glochidion spp.	*anam
9810	a plant	Impatiens balsamina	*kamantigi
6876	a plant	Lunasia amara	*paqit-an
10007	a plant	Sesbania grandiflora	*katúday
9565	a plant	Solanum spp.	*sili-sili
10064	a plant in the banana family	Musa textilis?	*qaRutay
12593	a plant with medicinal value, probably	Blumea spp.	*qalibun
11080	a shrub or tree	Melanolepis multiglandulosa	*álem
9651	a shrub, the Jew's mallow	Corchorus spp., fam. Malvaceae	*salúyut
12668	a small tree with leaves used as medicine	Citrus aurantifolia	*dayap
10265	a tall tree	Parkia spp.	*kúpaŋ
7998	a tree	Acalypha amentacea	*beRus
12362	a tree	Diospyros sp.	*kanadem
947	a tree	Diospyros spp.	*talaŋ₁
9647	a tree	Erythrina spp.	*sabaŋ₂
10966	a tree	Ficus sp.	*lab(e)nuR
10563	a tree	Ficus sp.	*tebéR
11024	a tree	Ganua obovatifolia, Sapotaceae	*piaŋa
608	a tree	Lagerstroemia speciosa	*banabá
11756	a tree	Mallotus lackeyi	*lamay
12325	a tree	Myristica spp.	*lagu₂
9093	a tree	Planchonella obovata	*banisah
9092	a tree	Pongamia spp.	*bani₂
10722	a tree	Prunus sp.	*taŋa₄
12392	a tree	Shorea polysperma	*taŋíliq
11555	a tree and its fruit, the Java plum	Syzygium cumini	*luŋ(e)búy
12198	a tree with bark that can be used as a shampoo	Ganophyllum falcatum	*gúguq
12228	a tree with edible fruit	Diplodiscus paniculatus	*baRubu
1208	a tree;	Macaranga tanarius	*binuŋa
12434	a vine	Caesalpinia bonduc	*kabit₃
10233	a vine with gourd or cucumber-like fruit	Luffa sp.?	*kabatíti
11595	a vine with red flower clusters, the Chinese honeysuckle	Quisqualis indica	*taluluŋ
12477	an edible plant, swamp cabbage	Ipomoea aquatica	*taŋkuŋ
11071	beautyberry	Callicarpa spp.	*anayup
11088	creeping vine that grows on sandy beaches, the beach morning glory	Ipomoea pes-caprae	*balinu
11148	hairy eggplant	Solanum ferox	*basula
10234	kind of aromatic herb	Pogostemon cablin	*kab(e)liŋ
9922	kind of ebony or persimmon tree with fruits that are pounded and used to stupefy fish	Diospyros spp.	*kanúmay
10312	kind of edible squash or gourd	Lagenaria leucantha	*tabayaR
11075	kind of tall grass	Themeda gigantea	*taŋ(e)laj
9750	kind of wild lemon tree, possibly	Citrus hystrix	*kabuRaw
9806	large forest tree with edible brown, hairy fruits	Diospyros discolor	*kamaguŋ
10412	lesser yam	Dioscorea sp.	*tugíq
10885	lima bean	Phaseolus lunatus	*patániq
2	Manila hemp	Musa textilis	*abaká
11872	mountain apple	Eugenia spp.	*makúpa
12657	native spinach	Amaranthus spp.	*kulitis
11653	Philippine cedar tree	Cedrela sp.	*kalantas
10749	plant with leaves used as a vegetable	Talinum paniculatum or Talinum triangulare	*talínum
1854	silk cotton tree	Ceiba pentandra	*buybuy
11145	small tree	Morinda citrifolia?	*apatut
12468	taro	Colocasia esculenta	*gabi
10978	the almasiga tree	Agathis celebica	*gala
11073	the castor bean plant	Ricinus communis	*katana
10163	the horseradish tree	Moringa oleifera	*maruŋgay
12753	the Philippine mahogany	Shorea or Hopea sp.	*yakál
9615	the sappan tree	Caesalpinia sappan	*sibukaw
12361	the seeded breadfruit tree	Artocarpus camansi	*kamansi
12253	the seeded breadfruit tree	Artocarpus camansi	*kamansiq
10762	tree with bright yellow fruit that has dry flesh	Lucuma nervosa	*tisaq
8970	wild palm tree with fruit similar to areca nut	Heterospathe elata	*sagisí

== See also ==
- Proto-Austronesian language
- Proto-Malayo-Polynesian language
- Proto-Oceanic language
- Proto-Polynesian language
- Philippine languages
- Philippine Negrito languages
- Austronesian languages
