= OREA =

Orea is a Greek word that means beautiful or great in height, see Panorea.
Orea is a Spanish word that means to air.

OREA or Orea may also refer to:

== Organizations ==
- OREA, a worker's union, see Air Georgian
- Diocese of Orea, see Archdiocese of Santa Severina
- Office of Russian and European Analysis
- Oral Roberts Evangelistic Association, a Pentecostal ministry founded by Oral Roberts
- Ontario Real Estate Association, Canada
- Oxford Real Estate Advisors, an investment advisory firm, see Oxford Development
- OREA Hotels, a hotel chain in the Czech Republic

== Television, film, music, and art ==
- Zoi Ine Orea (Life is Wonderful), see Los Roldán
- I orea ton Athinon, The Beauty of Athens, see Sperantza Vrana
- I orea tou kourea, see Giannis Gionakis
- OREA, song by Wallace Chung

== Places ==
- Orea, a municipality in Guadalajara, Castile-La Mancha, Spain

== People ==
=== Non-fictional ===
- Orea (Orio), King of Ulietea, see Poedua
- Mary Orea "Molly" (Pickett) Jackson, see Claiborne Fox Jackson
- Freddy Orea Lanz, writer from Venezuela
- Guillermo Orea Jr., see Muchachitas
- Guillermo Orea, see El Esqueleto de la señora Morales
- Juan de Orea, see Granada Cathedral
- Omar Chewe Orea Ochoa, see Adolfo Constanzo
- Gallerie Orea, see Vannetta Seecharran

=== Fictional ===
- Orea, a figure in Gnostic cosmology, see Norea

== Other uses ==
- Orea, a genus of giraffid
