= Waterleaf =

In botany, waterleaf can mean:

- Any plant of the genus Hydrophyllum
- Any plant which is a member of the waterleaf family, Hydrophylloideae
- Talinum fruticosum, a leaf vegetable of the family Talinaceae

In architecture, waterleaf means:

- Waterleaf (architecture), sculptural decoration used on the capitals of columns in late twelfth century Romanesque architecture
