= Pterophylla vescoi =

Conservation status
- Endangered (IUCN 3.1)

Scientific classification
- Kingdom: Plantae
- Clade: Embryophytes
- Clade: Tracheophytes
- Clade: Angiosperms
- Clade: Eudicots
- Clade: Rosids
- Order: Oxalidales
- Family: Cunoniaceae
- Genus: Pterophylla
- Species: P. vescoi

Binomial name
- Pterophylla vescoi (Drake) Pillon & H.C.Hopkins

Synonyms
- Weinmannia vescoi Drake; Weinmannia ovalifolia J.W.Moore

Species of flowering plant

Pterophylla vescoi, formerly known as Weinmannia vescoi, is a species of flowering plant in the family Cunoniaceae. It is a tree native to the island of Raiatea and possibly Tahiti in the Society Islands of French Polynesia.

== Description ==
Pterophylla vescoi is a low shrub to a small multi-trunked tree, growing from 0.15 to 4 meters high, with a trunk up to 5+ cm in diameter. It generally has multiple stems, and rarely grows with a single trunk. Its inflorescences are typically short and congested and don't extend beyond the leaves. The calyx and rachis (axis) of the inflorescence is either green or purple-red. The flowers similar in colour and scent to those of Pterophylla parviflora.

== Range and habitat ==
Pterophylla vescoi grows on the island of Raiatea. It is locally abundant on the plateaus of Temehani Rahi and Temehani Ute Ute between 355 and 740 meters elevation. It grows with trees of Metrosideros, Astronidium, and Alstonia and the endemic shrub Sclerotheca raiateensis, with an herb layer composed mostly of sedges (Cyperaceae) including Gahnia schoenoides and Machaerina bidwellii. The species has been reported from Tahiti, but the collections may have been mislabeled.
