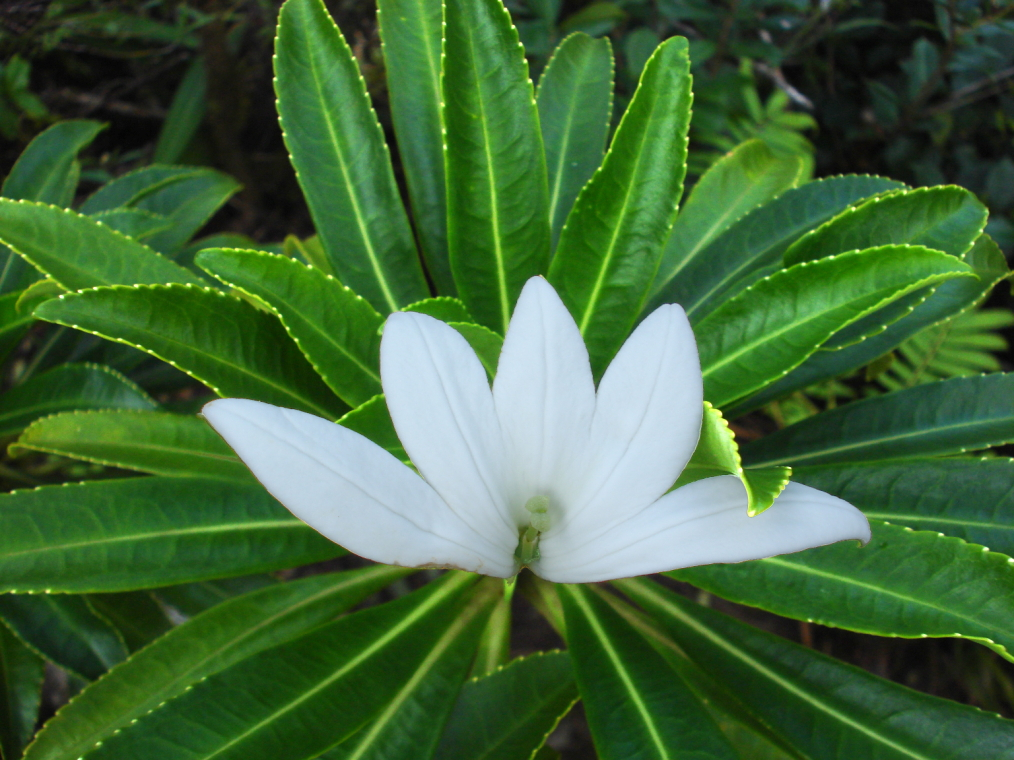

Conservation status
- Critically Endangered (IUCN 3.1)

Scientific classification
- Kingdom: Plantae
- Clade: Embryophytes
- Clade: Tracheophytes
- Clade: Angiosperms
- Clade: Eudicots
- Clade: Asterids
- Order: Asterales
- Family: Campanulaceae
- Genus: Sclerotheca
- Species: S. raiateensis

Binomial name
- Sclerotheca raiateensis (Baill.) Pillon & J.Florence

Synonyms
- Apetahia raiateensis Baill.

= Sclerotheca raiateensis =

Species of flowering plant

Sclerotheca raiateensis, commonly known as tiare apetahi and formerly known as Apetahia raiateensis, is a species of plant in the family Campanulaceae. It is a shrub native to the island of Raiatea in the Society Islands of French Polynesia.

Sclerotheca raiateensis in known only from the plateaus of Temehani Rahi and Temehani Ute Ute in the northern part of the island. It grows in a low montane scrub community unique to the plateaus, with Pterophylla vescoi, Metrosideros collina, Astronidium sp, and Alstonia costata, and an herb layer composed mostly of sedges (Cyperaceae) including Gahnia schoenoides and Machaerina bidwellii.

The plant is known for its large fragrant flowers. It figures prominently in local culture and mythology. It has been over-collected and attacked by introduced rats, and is now critically endangered.
