= Philippine language =

Philippine language may refer to:

- the Filipino language, a standardized register of the Tagalog language and national language of the Philippines
- one of the languages of the Philippines
- one of the Philippine languages, a linguistic grouping

== See also ==
- Proto-Philippine language
