= Serrata polynesiae =

Scientific classification
- Kingdom: Animalia
- Phylum: Mollusca
- Class: Gastropoda
- Subclass: Caenogastropoda
- Order: Neogastropoda
- Family: Marginellidae
- Genus: Serrata
- Species: S. polynesiae

Binomial name
- Serrata polynesiae Wakefield, Boyer & McCleery, 2002

Species of gastropod

Serrata polynesiae is a species of sea snail, a marine gastropod mollusc in the family Marginellidae, the margin snails. It occurs off Raiatea, in the Society Islands, where it is found in shallow water under dead coral rubble. It is sympatric with S. raiatea, which differs primarily in the banding pattern-- S. polynesiae has a single wide, brown band on the body whorl whereas S. raiatea has two bands. The species is also closely allied with S. translata of the Tuamotus, which differs from the Raiatean species by way of its three body whorl bands and oblique columellar plications.
