= Raʻiātea =

Island in French Polynesia

Raiatea
Native name: Raʻiātea
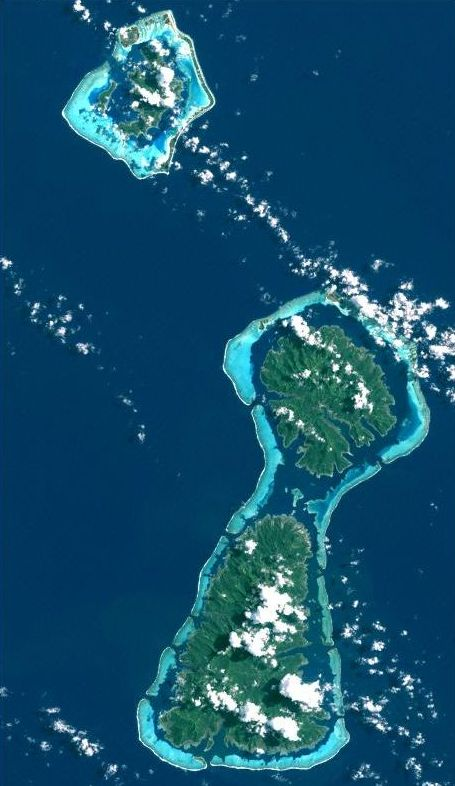
- The islands of Bora Bora (top) Tahaa (middle) and Raiatea (bottom). Tahaa and Raiatea share the same lagoon.

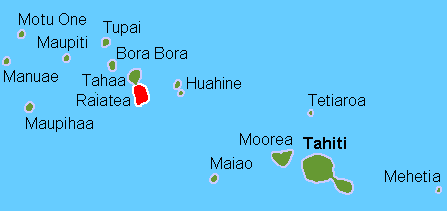
- Location of Raʻiātea in the Society Islands

Geography
- Location: Pacific Ocean
- Coordinates: 16.82°S 151.44°W
- Archipelago: Society Islands
- Major islands: Raiatea
- Area: 167.7 km^{2} (64.7 sq mi)
- Highest elevation: 1,017 m (3337 ft)
- Highest point: Mount Tefatua

Administration
- France
- Overseas collectivity: French Polynesia
- Capital and largest city: Uturoa (pop. 3,778)

Demographics
- Population: 12,545
- Pop. density: 72/km^{2} (186/sq mi)

Raʻiātea or Raiatea (Tahitian: Raʻiātea) is the second largest of the Society Islands, after Tahiti, in French Polynesia, in the South Pacific Ocean. The island is widely regarded as the "centre" of the eastern islands in ancient Polynesia, and it is likely that the organised migrations to the Hawaiian Islands, and other parts of East Polynesia, started at Raʻiātea.

A traditional name for the island is Havai'i, homeland of the Māori people. Situated on the southeast coast is the historical Taputapuatea marae, which was established by 1000 CE. The site was the political and religious center of eastern Polynesia for several centuries, and was inscribed on the UNESCO World Heritage List in 2017 for its historical significance.

The main township on Raʻiātea is Uturoa, the administrative centre for the Leeward Islands (French Îles Sous-le-vent). There are also colleges which serve as the main educational location for secondary schools for students from the regional islands of Bora Bora, Tahaa, Huahine and Maupiti.

== Etymology ==
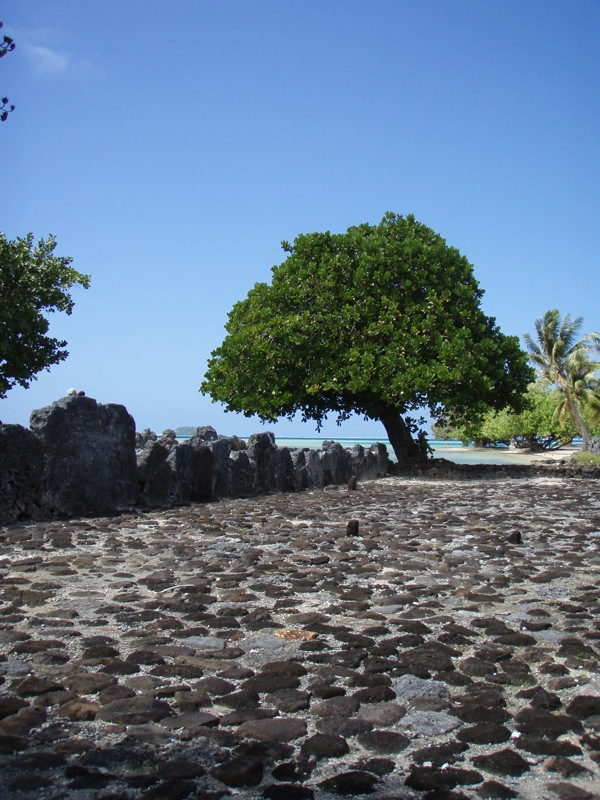
Taputapuatea marae, an ancient marae mentioned in the traditions of Polynesian peoples, including, for example, the Māori of Aotearoa. This is where the Hawaiian voyaging canoe Hōkūle'a landed on its first voyage in 1976.

The Tahitian language name Ra'iātea means bright sky. "Ulitea" is an obsolete transcription commonly used in the 19th century.

The extinct Raiatea starling inhabited the island; there is only one drawing of it in the world – in the Natural History Museum, London.

== History ==
The Polynesian navigator Tupaia, who sailed with explorer James Cook, was born in Raiatea around 1725. Cook visited Raiatea in 1769 and again in 1773–1774. He named the island "Ulitea". Omai (c.1751–1780), another young man from Raiatea, travelled with European explorers to London in 1774 and also served as an interpreter to Captain Cook on his second and third journeys.

=== Prehistory ===
In ancient times the island was called Havai'i, a sacred name in Polynesian culture and related to the names of Hawaii; Savai'i, in Samoa; and Havaiki, the ancient name for Fakarava in the Tuamotu. According to recent findings, the Society Islands were colonised from Samoa and Tonga around 200 BC, about the same time as the Marquesas. Together with the Marquesas, they formed the heart of Polynesia and thus the springboard for the settlement of Hawaii, New Zealand and Mangareva. A major ancestor who lived on the island was Ohomairangi, who was the protector of the Taputapuatea marae. The Maori tribal identity Ngā Oho was formed among his ancestors.

According to traditional histories, two Māori migration canoes, the Tainui and Arawa, left Raiatea for New Zealand in the late 13th Century or early 14th Century. Many Māori can trace their lineage to these canoes, including the Tainui and Te Arawa tribes.

Favored by Raiatea's geography, with valleys bounded by rocky ridges and open to the sea, nine independent tribal principalities emerged, which in turn subdivided into individual clans. This led to a strictly stratified social pattern: Society was divided into several separate social levels. At the top were the ariki or ari'i, the noble chiefs whose claim to leadership was legitimized by their descent from the founding ancestors. They were landowners and undisputed political and religious leaders.

In the Society islands they exercised great religious and cultural influence. The great temple (in Tahitian marae) of Taputapuatea, dedicated to the god Oro, was the most important religious center of the islands. His cult supplanted other traditional gods such as Taaroa and Tane, and the different marae were subsidiary to that of Taputapuatea. Around him the Arioi sect was formed, a religious, aristocratic, warlike and festive mixture, which was respected in all the islands and achieved, only with its presence and its taboo character, a truce in the tribal wars.

=== European colonization ===
Raiatea was discovered for Europe by British explorer James Cook on 20 July 1769 during his first voyage. Coming from Tahiti, he sailed onboard HMS Endeavour through the Avamo'a Reef passage, sacred to the Polynesians, anchored in Opoa Bay and landed near the Marae Taputapuatea. He hoisted the Union Jack and took possession of the island for the British Empire in a brief ceremony. To expand the Spanish Empire, Charles III of Spain ordered expeditions to be sent to the South Pacific. Manuel de Amat y Junyent, the viceroy of Peru, sent the Spanish Navy officer Domingo de Bonechea to Raʻiātea. Bonechea, commanding the frigate El Águila, arrived there in 1772, and he named the island "Princesa" and took possession of it for the Spanish Empire. However, the annexation had no political consequences.

Although neighboring Tahiti was already under the influence of European powers in the late 18th century and formally came under French protectorate in 1842, the clans of Raiatea fiercely resisted annexation efforts. However, Christian missionaries managed to gain increasing influence, which led to religious wars between followers of the traditional and Christian faiths. With the support of the Europeans, King Pōmare II was able to declare himself sovereign of the entire archipelago. On November 12, 1815, Pōmare's adversaries, the followers of the old faith, were decisively defeated at the Battle of Feipi.

In 1828, the Marae Taputapuatea was destroyed. In 1831, the Mamaia sect, successor to the already banned Arioi, again succeeded in expelling the missionaries from Raiatea. In 1832, the Mamaia were finally defeated and banished. Missionaries, including George Platt, returned and France tried to gain more and more influence. As early as 1842, Rear Admiral Abel Aubert du Petit-Thouars had claimed the Society Islands on behalf of France. However, King Louis Philippe I initially hesitated to sign the annexation announced by Petit-Thouars, fearing conflicts of interest with Britain, which also claimed them. As Queen Pōmare IV of Tahiti was pro-British and more attached to the Protestant missionaries, she allowed herself to be taken to Raiatea in this ambiguous situation in 1844 and ruled from there until 1847.

In 1880, France proclaimed a provisional protectorate over Raiatea and Tahaa. In 1887, at the request of European traders, the French bombarded the island, before occupying it and deposed its government. The island was formally annexed by France on April 21 1888. However, rebellions continued to occur in Raiatea. In 1888, the tribal chief Teraupo'o entrenched himself in the Avera Valley on the east coast and resisted French intervention. It was only in 1897 that he fell into captivity and was exiled to New Caledonia. 190 of his followers were forcibly relocated with their families to the island of Ua Huka. King Tamatoa VI was the last monarch, reigning over Raiatea and Tahaa from 1884 to 1888.

== Geography ==
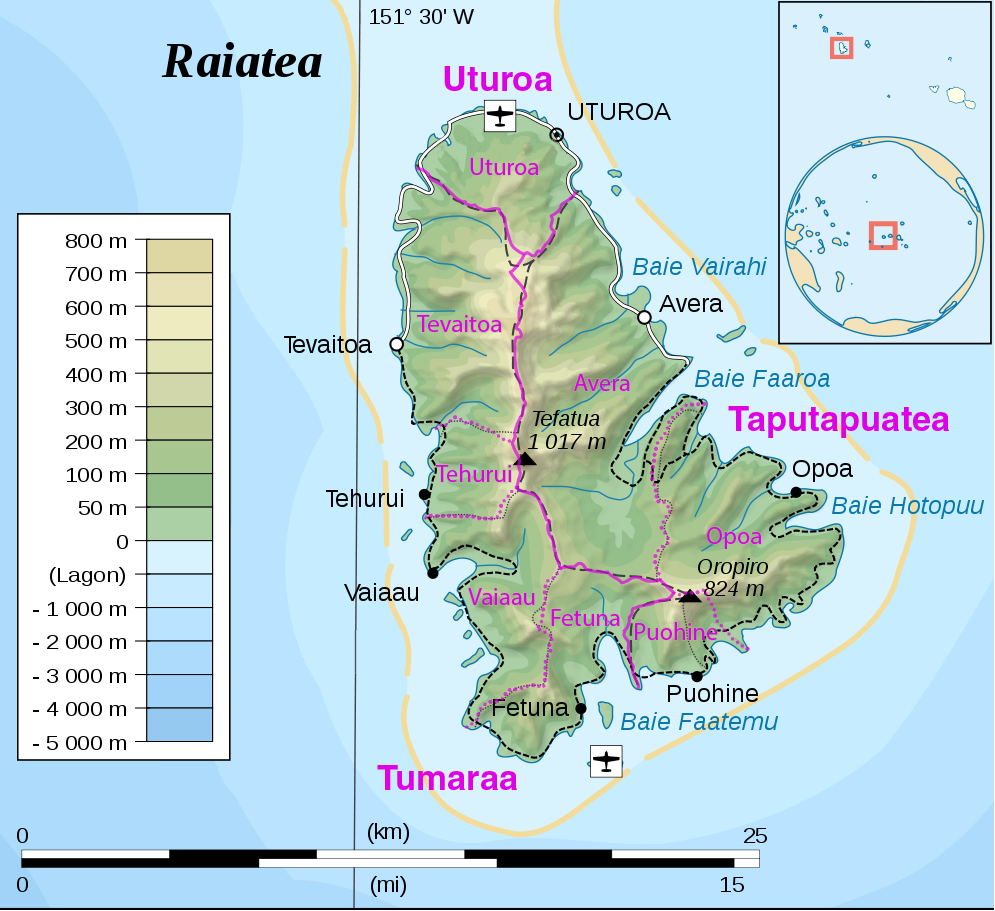
Map of Raiatea, depicting communes and associated communes

With a total area of 175 km^{2}, it is the second largest island of the Society archipelago, after Tahiti. Tahaa lies north of Raiatea, the two islands are separated by a 3 km strait. According to legend, it is the work of an enchanted moray eel possessed by the spirit of a deceased princess. A coral barrier reef surrounds the islands of Raiatea and Tahaa which share the same lagoon. The boat trip from Raiatea to Tahaa across the lagoon only takes about 20 minutes.

Raiatea's landscape is characterized by rugged peaks, a heavily indented coastline with deeply indented bays, and numerous small, tiny islands located in the lagoon.

There are three main mountain masses on the island, connected by lower ridges. The central mass includes Mount Tefatoaiti (1,017 m), the island's highest peak. The northern mass is known as the Temehani Plateau. The plateau generally undulates between 600 and 650 metres elevation, rising higher in places including the plateau's highest peak Tepahu (821 m). Oropiro is the highest peak in the southern mass.

The total population was 16,438 inhabitants in the 2002 census, distributed in three communes: Uturoa (the capital), Taputapuatea and Tumara'a. Uturoa is also the administrative capital of the Leeward Islands and the second urban center of French Polynesia, after Papeete.

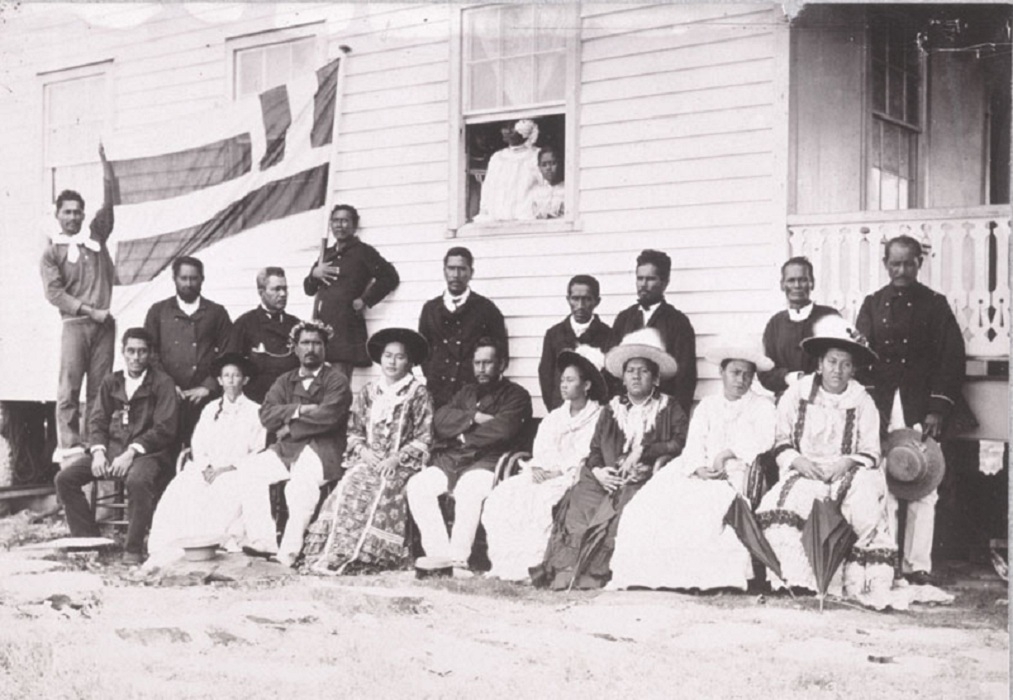
The Royal Family of Raiatea in the 1880s, when Raiatea became a French Protectorate. In the background, holding the flag, is Teraupo.

The main island is of volcanic origin and consists mainly of igneous rocks. On the barrier reef and in the lagoon there are numerous white coral sand motu – low barrier reef islands – and rubble. The most beautiful sandy beaches are found on these motu, while the rocky coastline of the main island of Raiatea has no beaches worth mentioning. From the peaks, the highest of which is Toomaru at 1032 m,10 steeply sloping valleys and gorges open out to the sea, separated by narrow rocky ridges. The numerous streams often form spectacular waterfalls. The eastward-flowing Apoomau River rises in the 1017 m high Tefatoatiti,11 and flows into Faaroa Bay. It is the only navigable river in Polynesia and, depending on the water level, can be traveled a few kilometers in small boats.

Cultivated land and settlements are found in a narrow coastal strip; the interior of Raiatea is largely uninhabited.

=== Climate ===
The climate is tropical and humid. The average annual temperature is 26 °C, with negligible differences between months. The average annual rainfall is about 1800 mm. The rainiest month is December, but the rains are, as usual in the tropics, intense and of short duration. The (winter) months of August and September are quite dry.

=== Flora ===
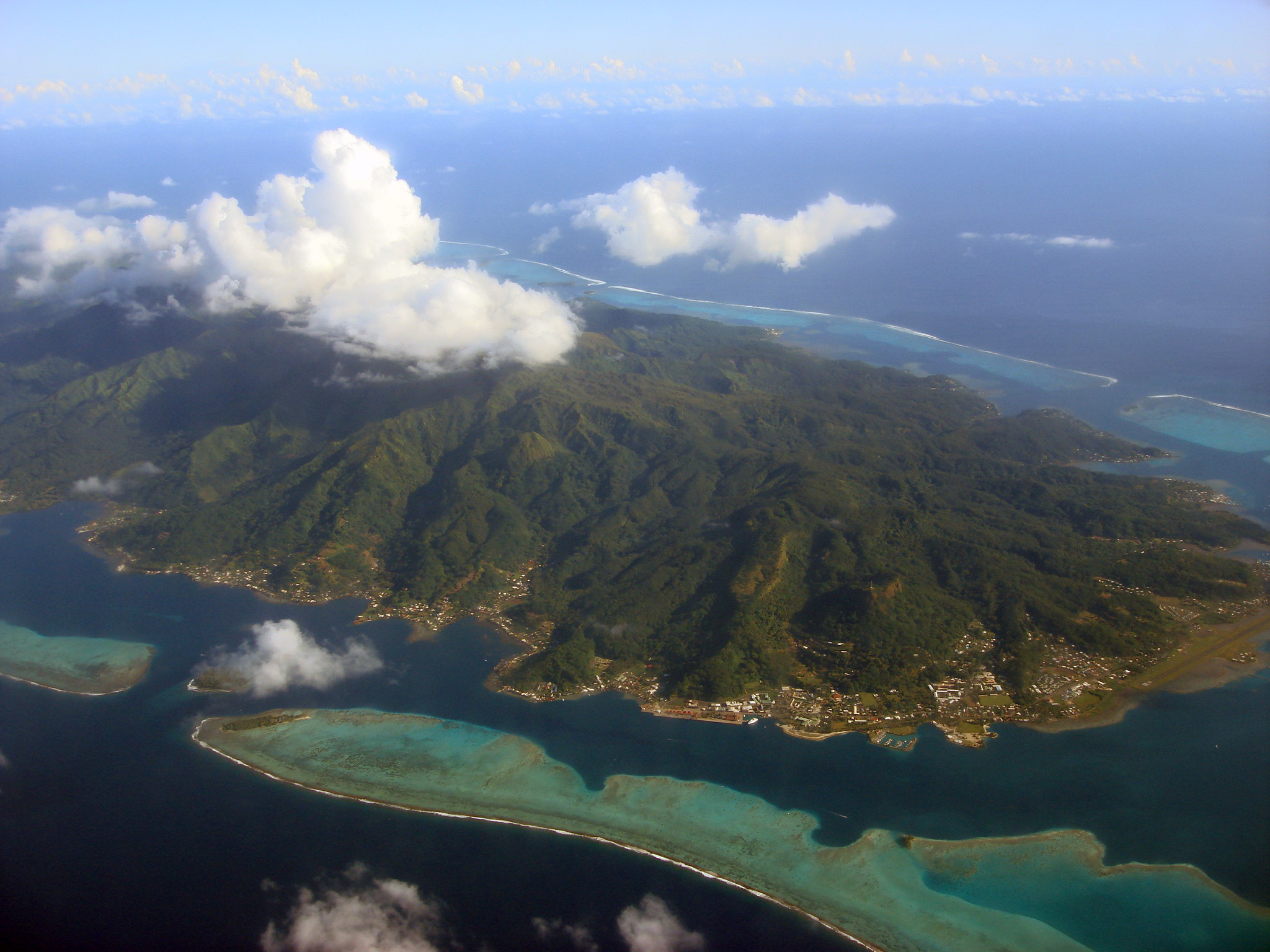
Aerial view of the island

The vegetation of French Polynesia has a high proportion of endemic plants and a relative scarcity of species. The isolated location of the islands and the fact that they have never been connected to a continental landmass explain the high number of endemic plants. In the South Pacific, plants range from west to east. This caused the biodiversity of the islands to decrease eastward. For example, the islands of New Guinea and New Caledonia, located in the west, have a much higher number of species compared to Raʻiātea. In contrast, the islands of the Tuamotu Archipelago, the Pitcairn Islands and Easter Island in the far eastern Pacific are much less species-rich.

In almost 2,000 years of settlement history, humans have changed the flora of Raʻiātea with cultivation, especially in the fertile coastal areas. Coconut palms, breadfruit trees, taro, yams, cassava, sweet potatoes and various tropical fruits are grown as food crops. Pineapple and vanilla fruits are exported and grown on small family farms.

Significant remnants of the original vegetation have survived in the inaccessible, lush interior of the island, although the native plant communities are now threatened by guava bushes, bamboo thickets and other anthropogenic plants.

The remaining natural vegetation on the island consists mostly of savanna and evergreen forest, with areas of coastal strand and hillside scrub. Raʻiātea has more savanna than the other Society islands. Most savanna is dominated by the bright green fern Dicranopteris linearis, which can form dense patches up to two metres high, interspersed with clumps of darker trees. Drier areas, including lower slopes and ridges on the north and northwest sides of the island, are dominated by Miscanthus floridulus, known as aiho or sword grass, a tall coarse bunch grass. The introduced molasses grass (Melinis minutiflora) is also common, forming lower gray-green patches among the bunchgrasses.

Lowland forests are dominated by mape trees (Inocarpus fagifer), which grow up to 25 meters high. Mape trees have large, fluted, and buttressed trunks and dense canopies. The seed pods are roasted and eaten by local people. Other lowland forest trees include Hibiscus tiliaceus, breadfruit (Artocarpus altilis), and Cananga odorata, along with stands of the native bamboo Schizostachyum glaucifolium. Understory plants include the fern Angiopteris evecta and coffee (Coffea arabica), which was introduced to the islands for cultivation and now forms a dense shrub undergrowth in parts of the forest.

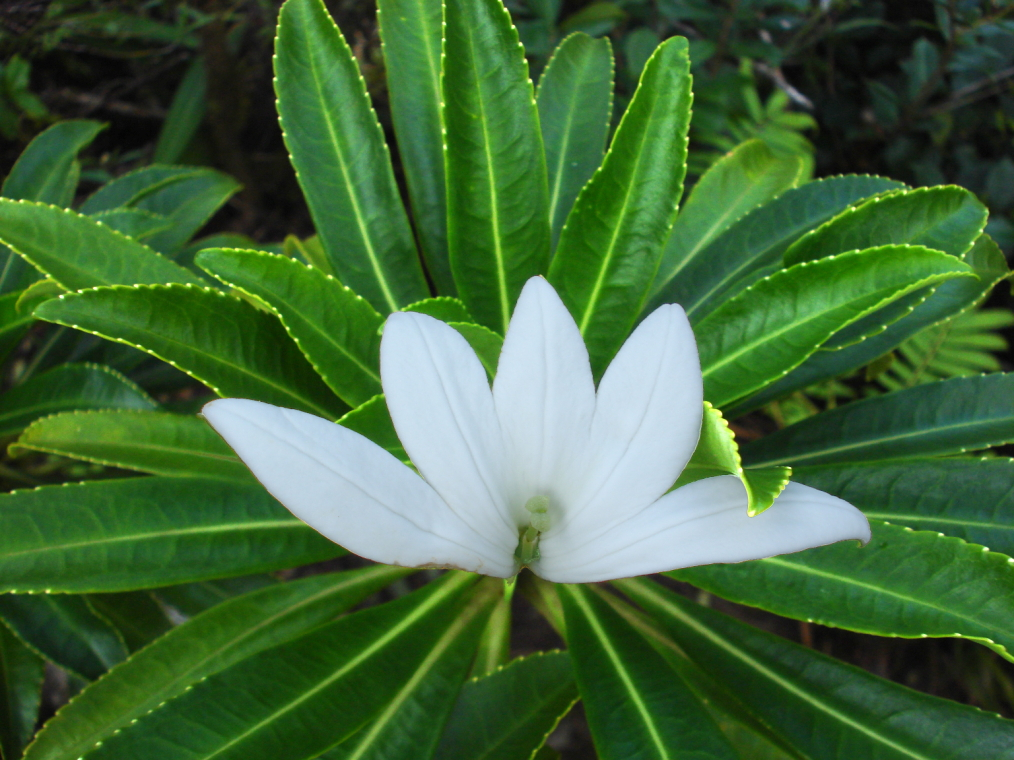
Tiare apetahi (Sclerotheca raiateensis), endemic to Mount Temehani

The Temehani Plateau has a distinctive scrub forest, with shrubs and low trees rising .5 to 1 meter high and occasionally to 2 or 3 meters high. Characteristic plants include Decaspermum lanceolatum (endemic to Raiatea), Pterophylla vescoi, Pandanus tectorius, Metrosideros collina, and species of Canthium, Wikstroemia, Alstonia, Astronia, Glochidion, Styphelia, Bidens, Xylosma, Garnotia, Sphenomeris, Lycopodium, and Cassytha. The grass-like sedges Gahnia schoenoides and Machaerina bidwellii are predominant in the understory and in open areas. Tiare apetahi (Sclerotheca raiateensis) is a shrub known only from the Temehani Plateau. It is known for its large fragrant flowers. The plant has been over-collected and attacked by introduced rats, and is now critically endangered.

=== Fauna ===
One endemic bird was the brown-headed parakeet (Cyanoramphus ulietanus). It was discovered by Captain Cook's crew. After an eventful stay in Tahiti, where Captain Cook also witnessed a human sacrifice, he left on September 29, 1777, to explore other islands in the atoll. He first went to nearby Eimeo (present-day Maiao), where he stayed briefly, and then headed for Ulitea (present-day Raiatea), which is only a few days northwest of Tahiti. During his 34-day stay, a unique parrot was collected on the island. At least two specimens have been preserved for posterity and are in museums in London and Vienna. Unfortunately, there are no reports on the way of life of this parakeet.

During his time at Raiatea, Cook had the ships Resolution and Discovery brought ashore for urgent maintenance work. It is possible that this time was sufficient for rats, cockroaches and other vermin to wash ashore, and it appears that it was they that sealed the brown-headed parakeet's demise.

Mammals did not originally exist on the Society Islands; they were all introduced by humans. The early Polynesian settlers brought dogs, pigs, chickens and the Pacific rat as food animals, and Europeans introduced goats, cows, sheep and horses. The indigenous land animals are only insects, land crabs, snails and lizards. In Raiatea there are no animals dangerous to humans. Sand fleas on the beach and mosquitoes, which are everywhere in the interior of the island, can be unpleasant.

The marine fauna of the lagoon and coral reef is very rich in species. In addition to hundreds of different coral fish, divers can observe numerous mollusks, echinoderms and crustaceans from the tropical sea. The waters surrounding Raiatea and Tahaa are known for their rich population of colorful nudibranchs. The reefs are dotted with grottoes and caves that provide shelter for many marine creatures. Among divers, the "octopus grotto", located between Raiatea and Tahaa, is well known. Behind the reef are sharks, rays, swordfish and sea turtles.

Raiatea was known as the "center of Partula biodiversity" due to having the most species of Partula, 33 species in total. Unfortunately, like all of the Society Islands, Euglandina rosea was introduced to the islands, resulting in the extinction of 30 species. The remaining 3 species, P. garrettii, P. hebe, and P. navigatoria are extinct in the wild and would be extinct without human intervention.

== Administration ==
Politically, Raiatea today belongs to French Polynesia. The island is a French overseas territory and is therefore associated with the European Union. It is administered by a subdivision (Subdivision administrative des Îles Sous-le-Vent) of the High Commission of French Polynesia (Haut-commissariat de la République en Polynésie française) based in Papeete.

The island is divided into three communes (municipalities):

- Uturoa
- Taputapuatea
- Tumaraa

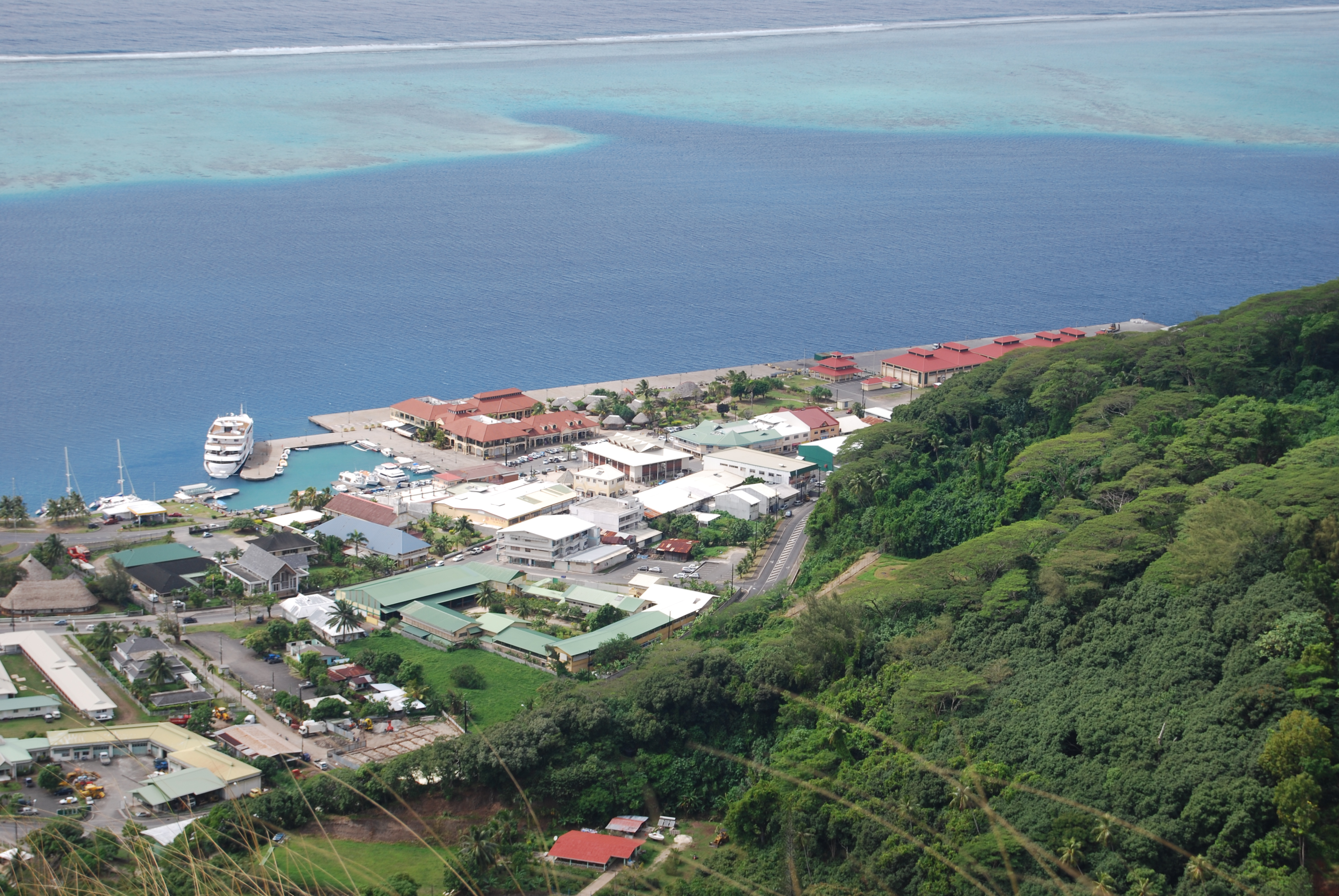
Uturoa, Raiatea

These three communes are inside the administrative subdivision of the Leeward Islands.

Raiatea had a total of 12,832 inhabitants according to 2012 data, with a population density of 66 inhabitants/km^{2}.

The official language is French. The currency is the CFP franc, which is pegged to the euro. The administrative budget of the Society Islands is substantially subsidized by French and EU funds.

The main town is Uturoa, in the north of the island, which is also the administrative and economic center of the Leeward Islands.

== Economy ==
The island economy is mainly agricultural with exports of vanilla, pineapple and coconut. The plant Nono (or noni) (Morinda citrifolia) is also grown. Fā'aroa Valley is a large and important agricultural region with the rural economy and the cultivation of vanilla supported by a local research facility. Pearl farming is also an important industry while farming cattle, sheep and pigs has recently decreased. There is less tourism compared to the other islands in the archipelago. The local tourist infrastructure comprises boarding houses, two marinas, a four star hotel, The Hawaiki Nui and a port for visiting cruise ships. There is also a fledgling local industry in the maintenance of yachts and shipbuilding. The main source of employment is the island's public service and the consumer market. Raiatea has a small road that runs around the entire island. Raiatea Airport is an airport in Uturoa.

== Tourism ==
Although the island has several hotels up to the luxury category, Raiatea is quieter and less developed in terms of tourism compared to Tahiti and Bora Bora. Raiatea is especially attractive to offshore sailors. There are several yacht charter companies, and the island is often referred to as the nautical center of Polynesia. There are marinas with good infrastructure in Uturoa and Baie Faaroa to the west. The island is visited by cruise ships from time to time.

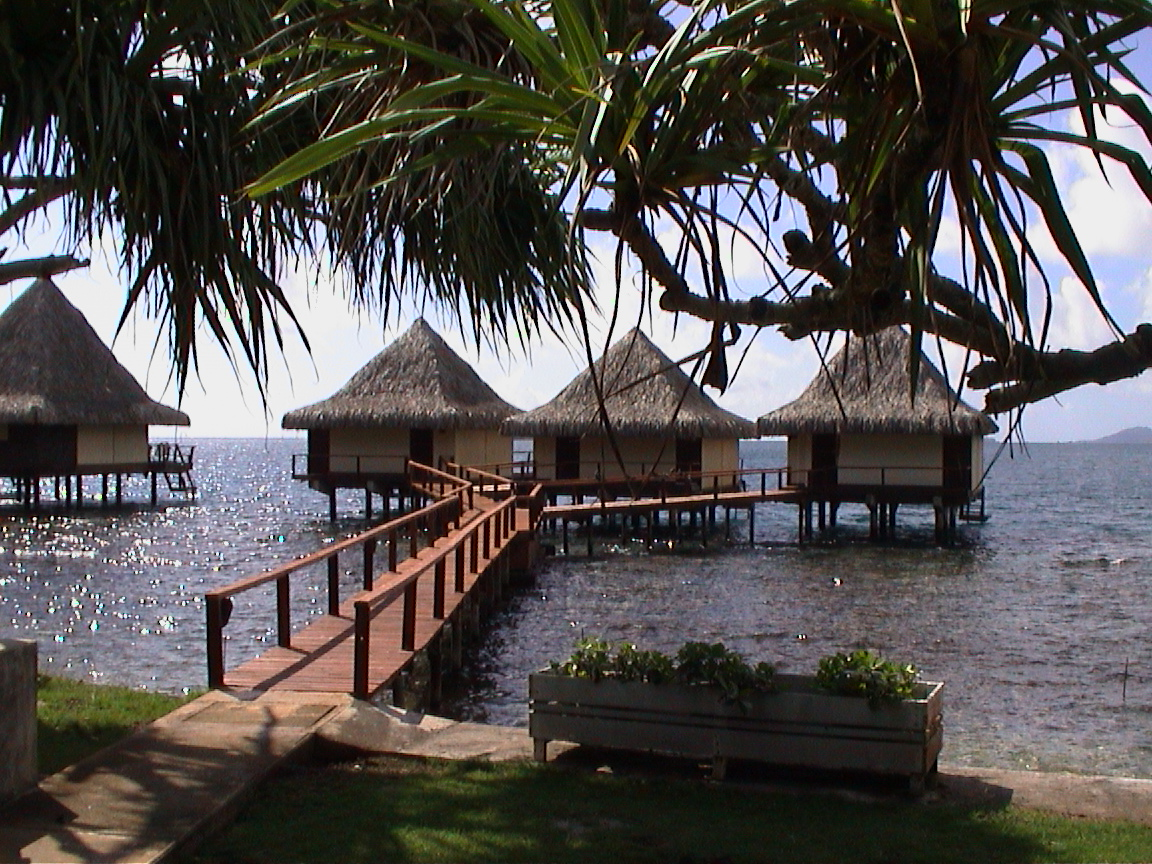
Tourist facilities on the island

=== Places of interest ===
The main town of Uturoa serves as a quiet administrative and transit hub. For cruise ship tourists, the port's reception terminal was redesigned a few years ago, a small park was laid out and the esplanade was paved with natural stones from the island in various colors. Portuguese craftsmen were in charge of laying the beautiful motifs in traditional Portuguese style. The botanical garden of Uturoa is interesting with many rare and exotic plants.

The main attraction of Raiatea is undoubtedly the Taputapuatea place of worship. It comprises several worship platforms (marae) that were originally distributed in a sacred grove surrounded by tabu. Several of the sites have been restored. The largest platform was built in the early 17th century with huge upright limestone slabs and is dedicated to Oro, the god of war.

There are other important ceremonial sites on the island. In the Avera valley, north of Opoa on the east coast, is another large ceremonial platform. Nearby, archaeological excavations have uncovered the remains of dwellings and stone tool workshops. The ceremonial site at Tainuu, on the northwest coast, is also well preserved. In addition to the imposing coral rock slabs with which the marae were delimited, petroglyphs are also preserved here. On this site, sacred to the Polynesians, missionaries built a church in the 19th century.

An interesting destination for divers is the wreck of the Nordby, a Danish trimotor that sank around 1900. The wreck, very well preserved, is located at a depth of about 20 m, not far from the Pearl Beach Resort on the northeast coast.

== Infrastructure ==
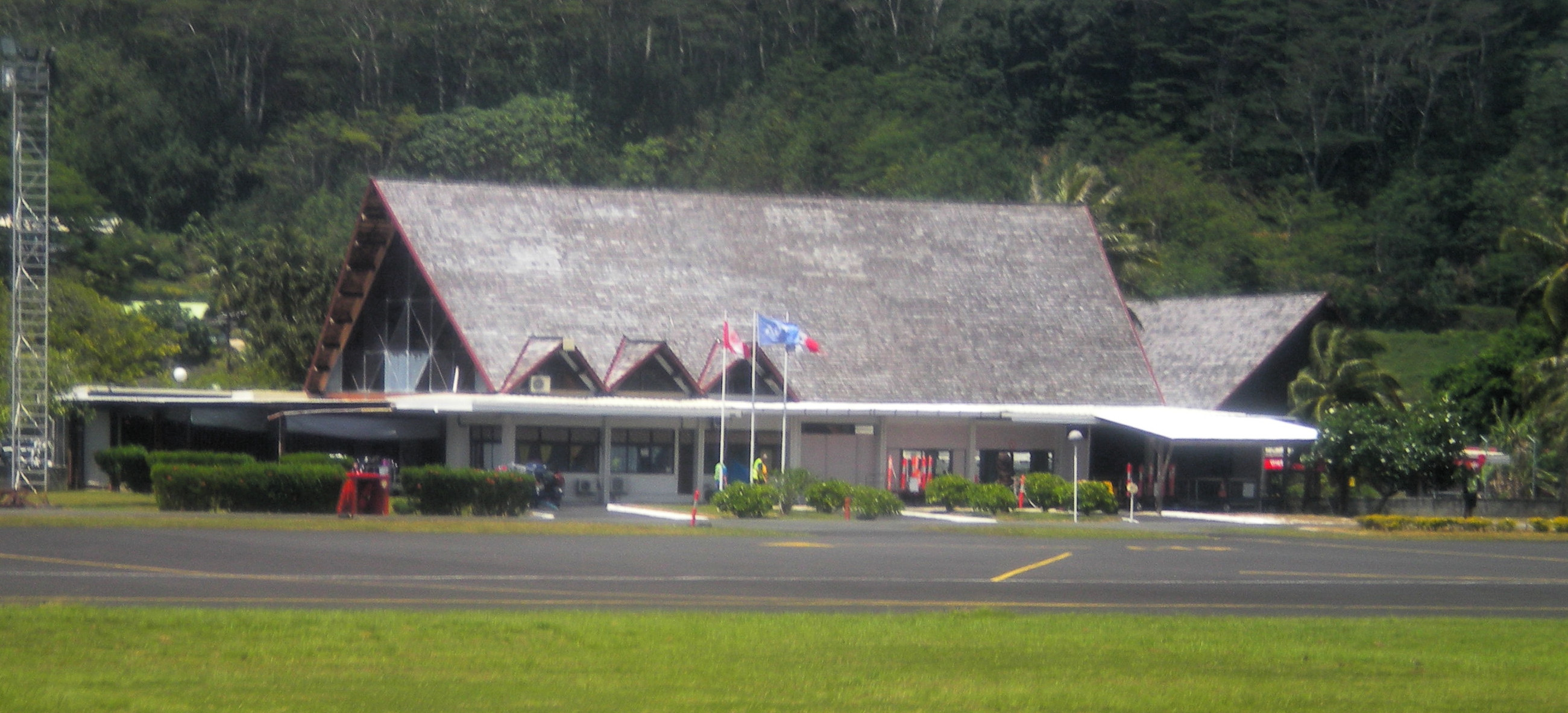
Raiatea Airport

The island is surrounded by a 98 km road, while another road runs through the center. Since the 1980s, numerous infrastructure works have been carried out to improve the road network and open up the southern part of the island by building bridges, asphalting and installing electricity, telephone and drinking water distribution networks.

The port of Uturoa was remodeled in the early 2000s, allowing cruise ships such as the Tahitian Princess, the Gauguin, the Amsterdam and the World to make weekly calls during the tourist season. Raiatea is the administrative capital of the Leeward Islands and the residence of the state administrator.

There is a hospital, a general secondary school (called LUT, which celebrated its 60th anniversary in May 2021) and a vocational school, three secondary schools (one of which is private) and several primary schools and kindergartens.

Raiatea is the only French Polynesian island (outside of Tahiti) with a secondary school. Therefore, most students from neighboring islands, such as Bora-Bora, Tahaa, Maupiti or Huahine, come here for their secondary education. The island also has an airfield, a commercial port, a market and two marinas.

== See also ==
- List of volcanoes in French Polynesia
- Overseas France
- Dependent Territory
- Poedua
