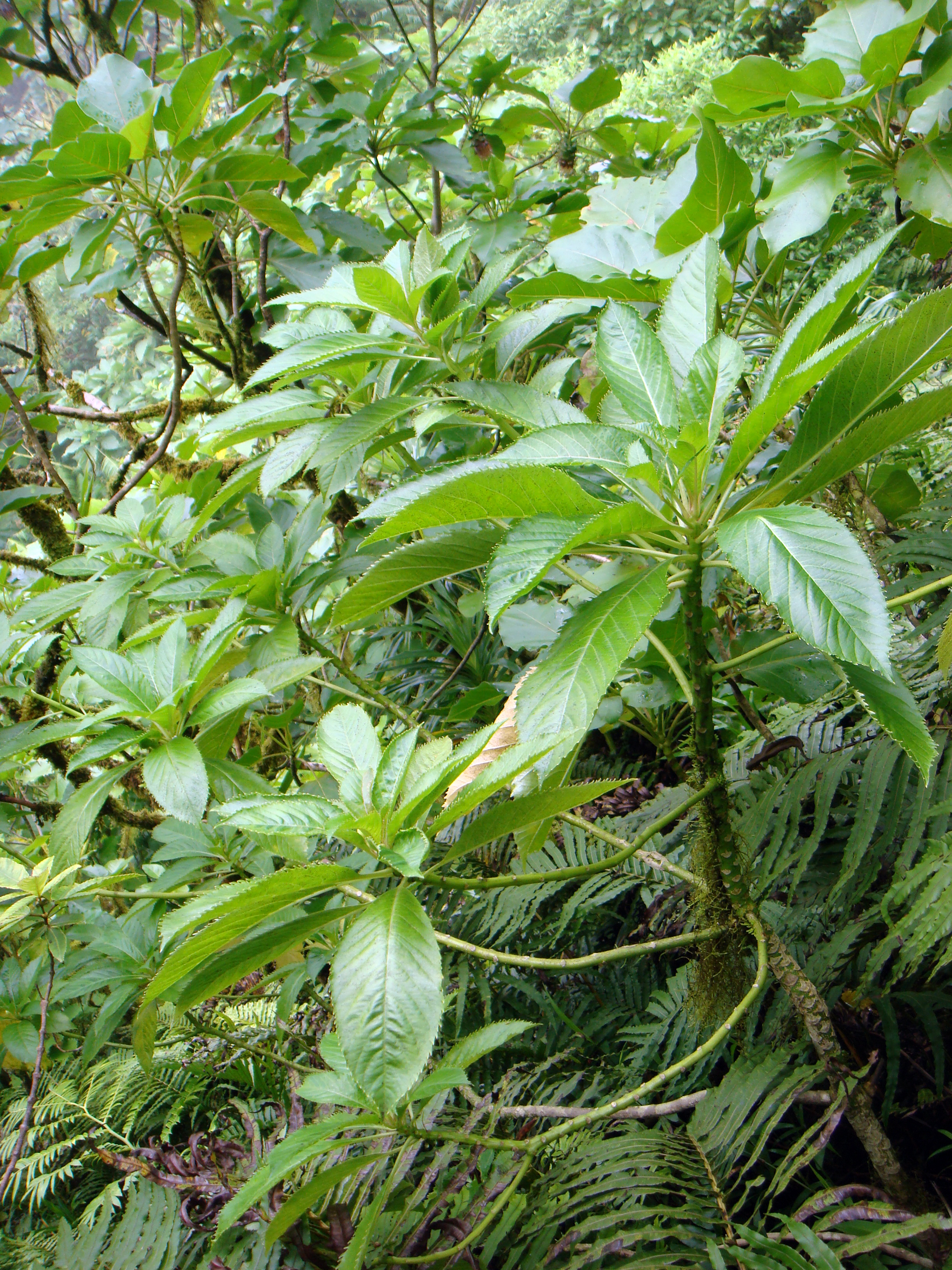
- Sclerotheca viridiflora

Scientific classification
- Kingdom: Plantae
- Clade: Tracheophytes
- Clade: Angiosperms
- Clade: Eudicots
- Clade: Asterids
- Order: Asterales
- Family: Campanulaceae
- Subfamily: Lobelioideae
- Genus: Sclerotheca; A.DC.

Type species
- Sclerotheca arborea (G.Forst.) A.DC.

Synonyms
- Apetahia Baill.

= Sclerotheca =

Genus of flowering plants

Sclerotheca is a genus of plants native to various islands in the South Pacific. Nine of the ten species are native to French Polynesia, the tenth to Rarotonga in the Cook Islands.

- Sclerotheca arborea (G.Forst.) A.DC. – Tahiti
- Sclerotheca forsteri Drake – Moorea, Tahiti
- Sclerotheca jayorum J.Raynal – Tahiti
- Sclerotheca longistigmata F.Br. – Marquesas
- Sclerotheca magdalenae J.Jacques – Tahiti
- Sclerotheca margaretae R.Br. – Rapa
- Sclerotheca oreades E.Wimm. – Tahiti
- Sclerotheca raiateensis (Baill.) Pillon & J.Florence – Raiatea
- Sclerotheca seigelii (J.Florence) Pillon & J.Florence – Marquesas
- Sclerotheca viridiflora Cheeseman – Rarotonga
