= Amphipetalum =

Scientific classification
- Kingdom: Plantae
- Clade: Tracheophytes
- Clade: Angiosperms
- Clade: Eudicots
- Order: Caryophyllales
- Family: Talinaceae
- Genus: Amphipetalum; Bacig. (1988)
- Species: A. paraguayense

Binomial name
- Amphipetalum paraguayense Bacig. (1988)

Genus of flowering plants

Amphipetalum paraguayense is a species of flowering plant belonging to the family Talinaceae. It is the sole species in genus Amphipetalum. It is a perennial native to eastern Bolivia and Paraguay.
