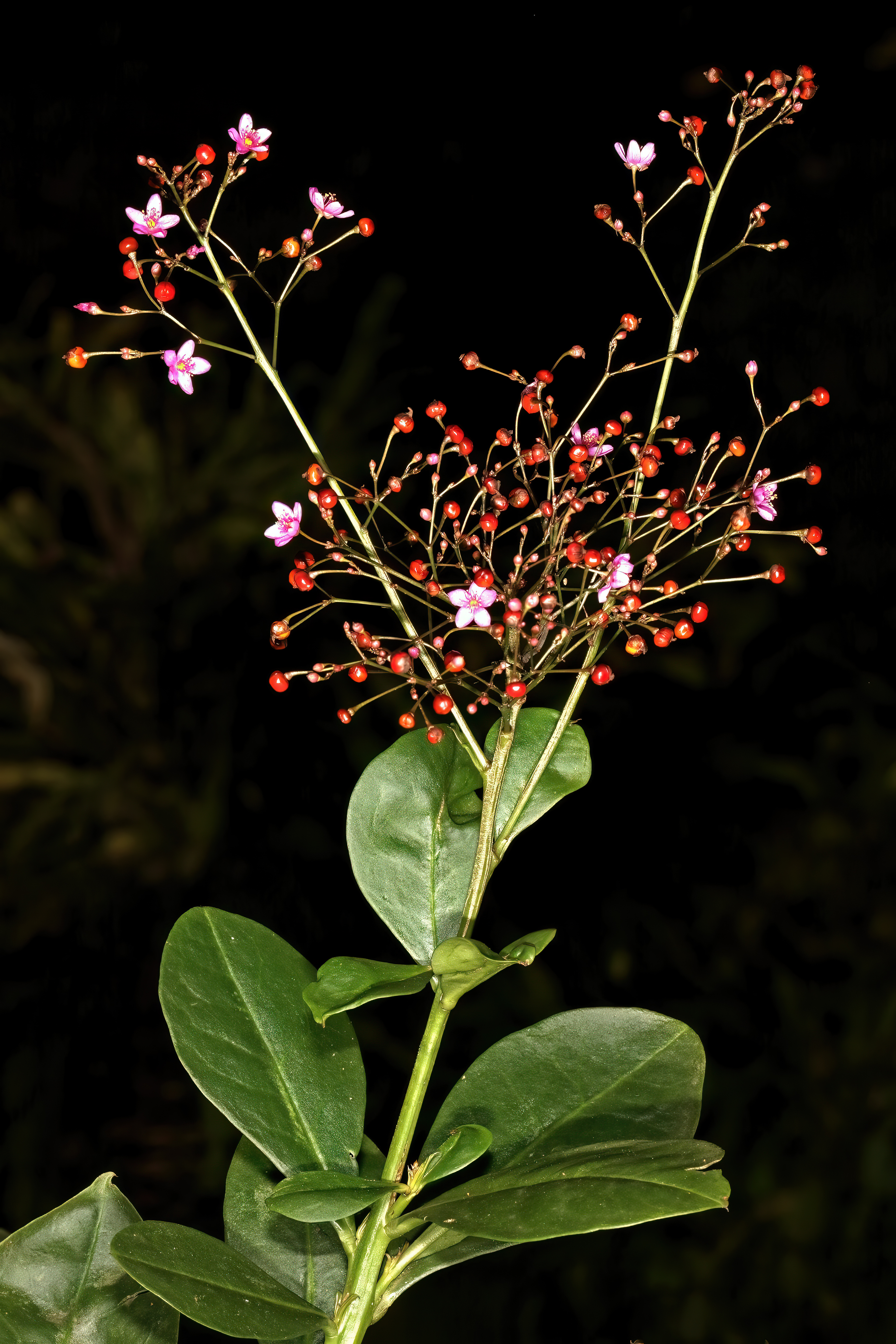

Scientific classification
- Kingdom: Plantae
- Clade: Tracheophytes
- Clade: Angiosperms
- Clade: Eudicots
- Order: Caryophyllales
- Family: Talinaceae
- Genus: Talinum
- Species: T. paniculatum

Binomial name
- Talinum paniculatum (Jacq.) Gaertn.

= Talinum paniculatum =

Species of shrub

Talinum paniculatum is a succulent subshrub in the family Talinaceae that is native to much of North and South America, and the Caribbean countries. It is commonly known as fameflower, Jewels-of-Opar (a name borrowed from the title of the novel Tarzan and the Jewels of Opar by Edgar Rice Burroughs), or pink baby's-breath.

== Classification ==
The species was described in 1760 under the basionym of Portulaca paniculata by Nicolaus Joseph von Jacquin (1727–1817), then recombined in the genus Talinum in 1791 by Joseph Gaertner (1732–1791). In current classification, Talinum paniculatum belongs to the family Talinaceae, it was assigned in the past to the family of the purslane or Portulacaceae.

== Appearance ==
Talinum paniculatum bears tuberous roots and panicles of flowers and produces tiny, jewel-like fruits. Its peculiarity is its very long root of orange colour that reaches about 80 centimeters. It is a very bad herb in crops, and it proliferates very easily, since it roots very easily, even after it has been plucked and if it has any part of the root in contact with the soil. The plant as a whole can reach almost 2 meters high measured from the soil surface, where after maturity, its brown seeds (in abundance) spread easily through the surrounding area.

== Native range ==
Talinum paniculatum is native to the southern United States, much of Latin America (such as Paraguay and Uruguay) and the Caribbean. It has been introduced notably in Africa and Asia.

== Uses ==
Talinum paniculatum is often grown as an ornamental plant. Cultivars include 'Kingwood Gold', 'Limón', and 'Variegatum'. The leaves are edible and have been used in traditional medicine in Asia.

Used in home medicine as a diuretic, healing, emollient, vulval and anti-infective, it is also consumed in salads.

== Gallery ==
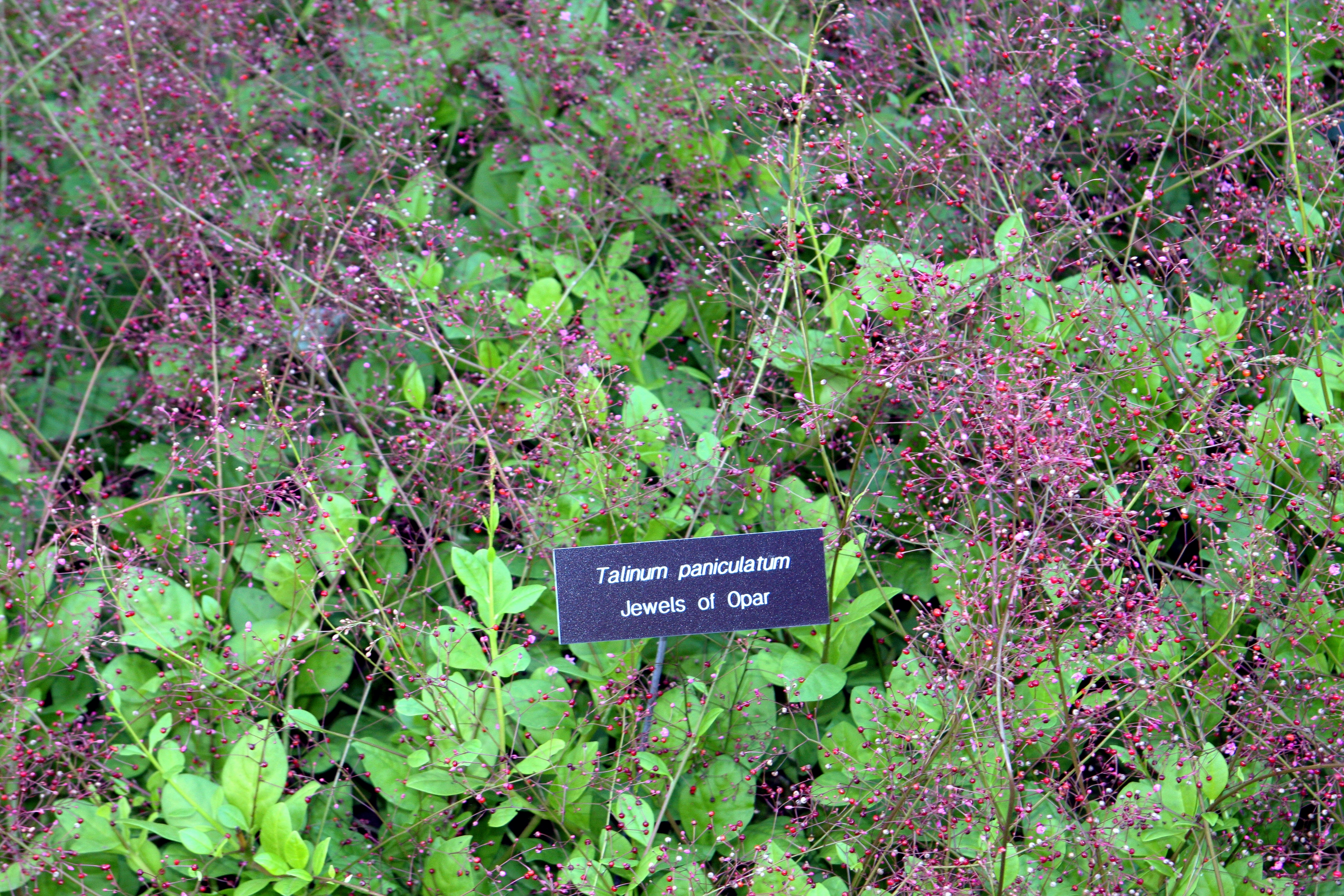
Talinum paniculatum with fruits and flowers

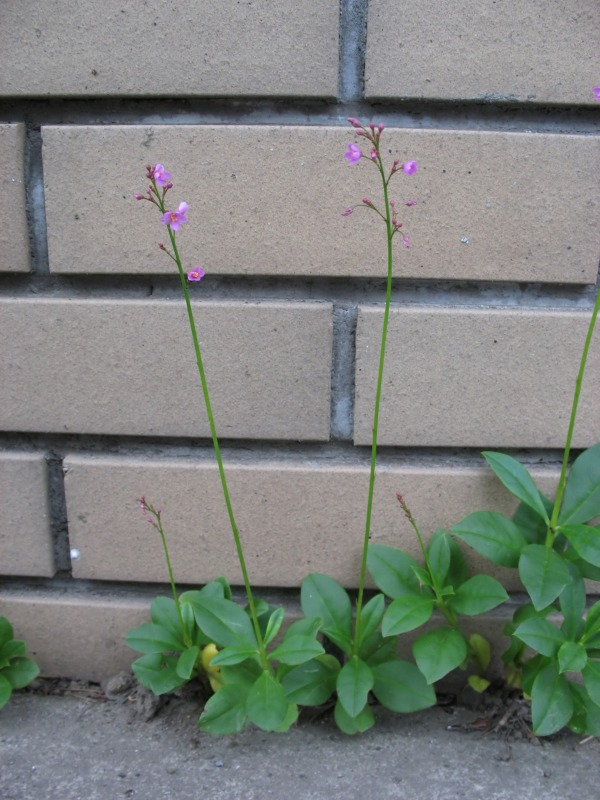
Growing beneath a brick wall

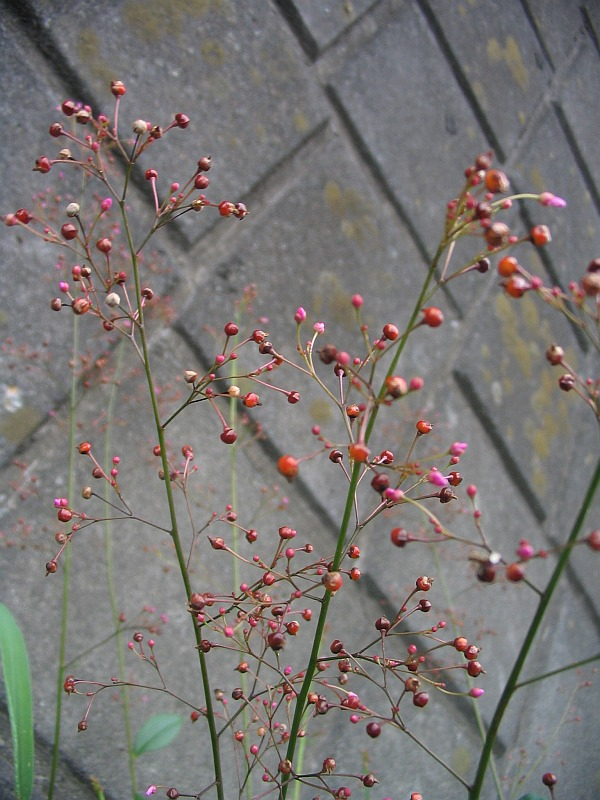
Its fruits

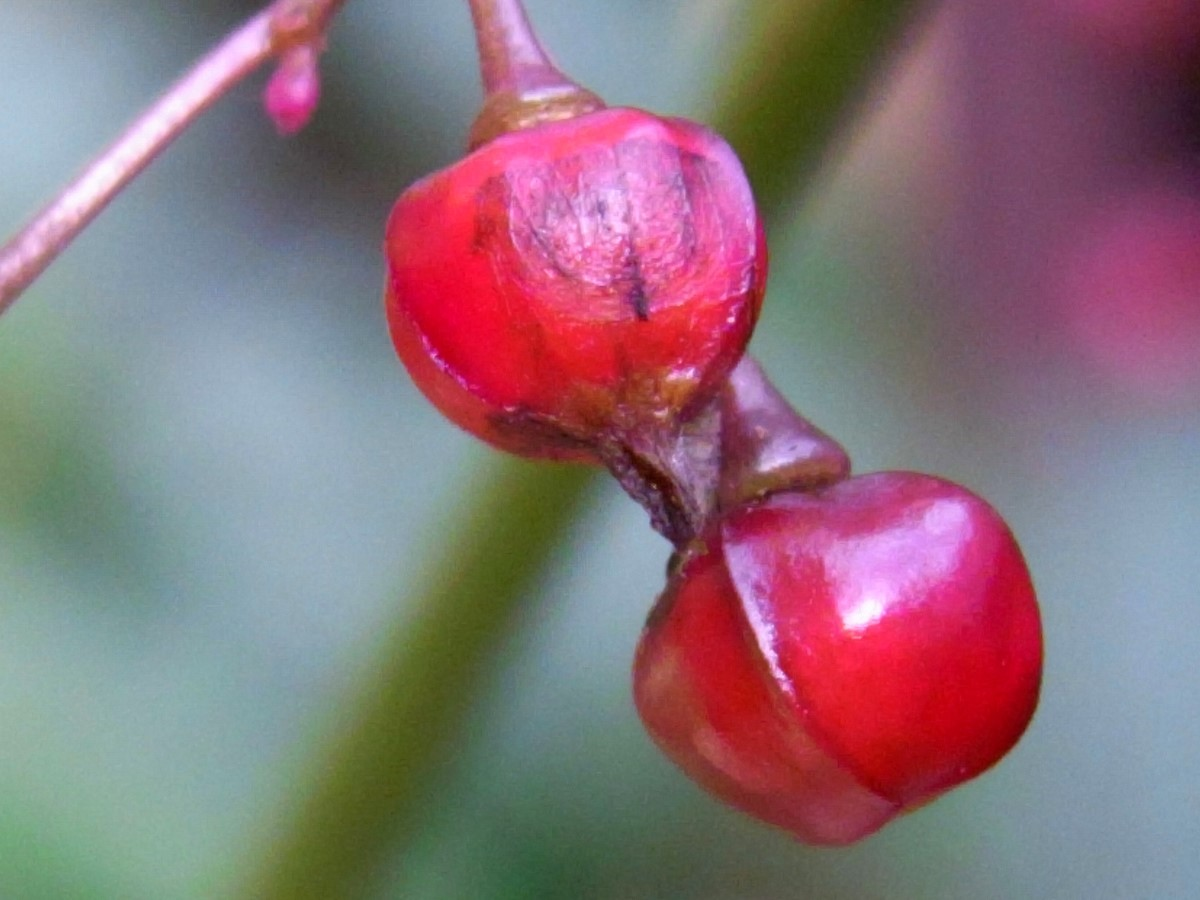
Closeup of fruits

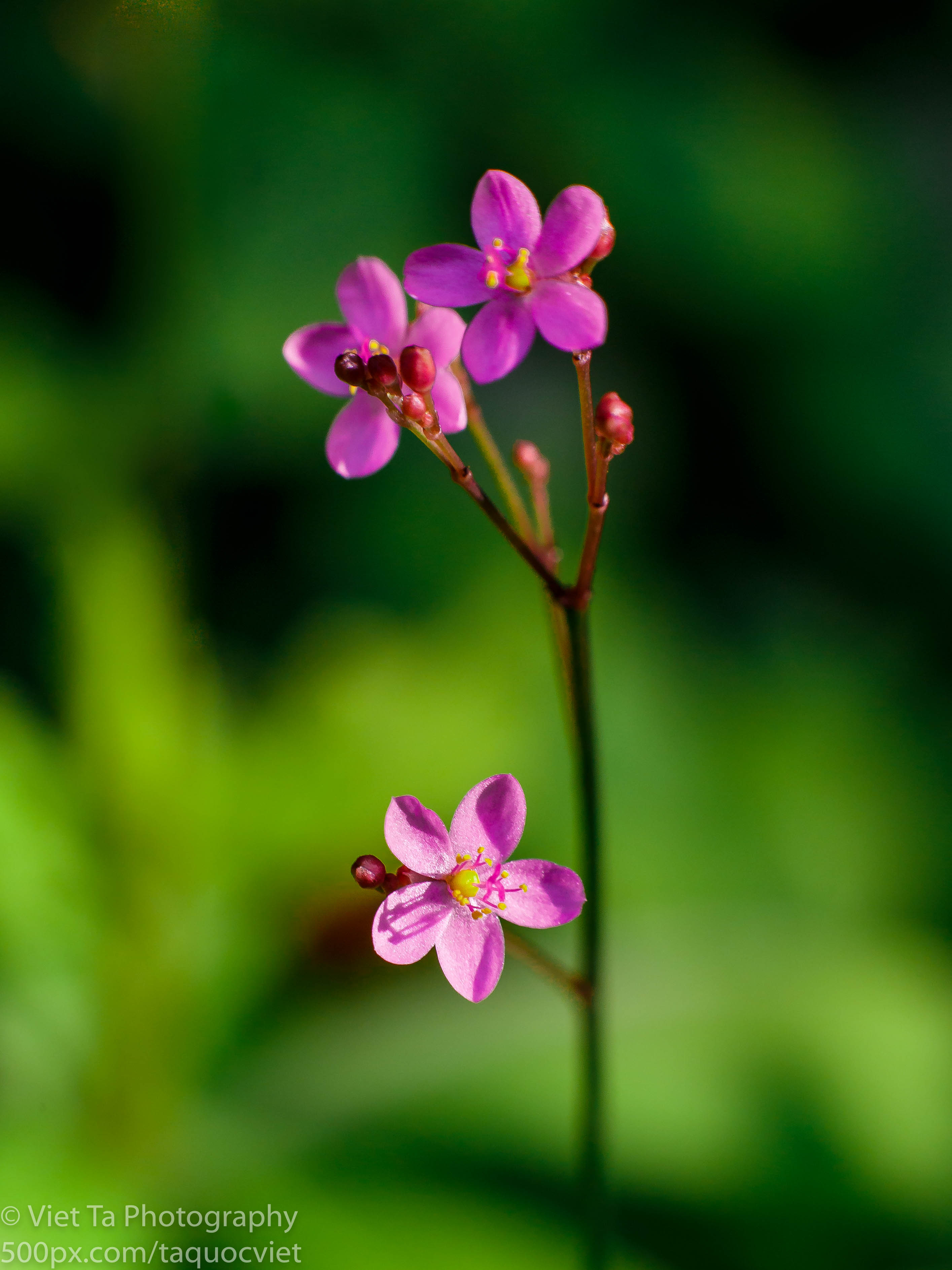
Talinum paniculatum in Singapore Botanic Gardens

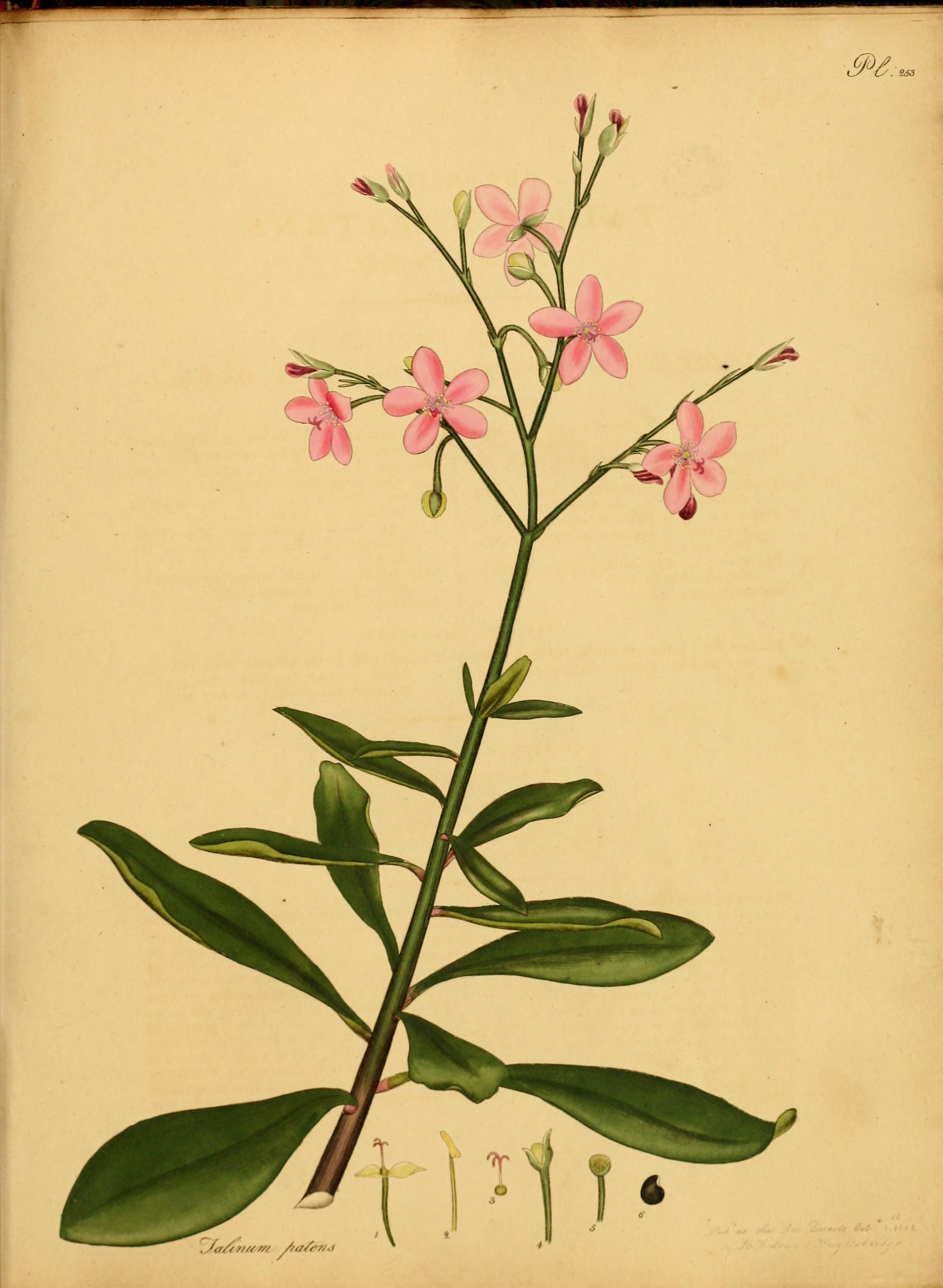
Botanical drawing

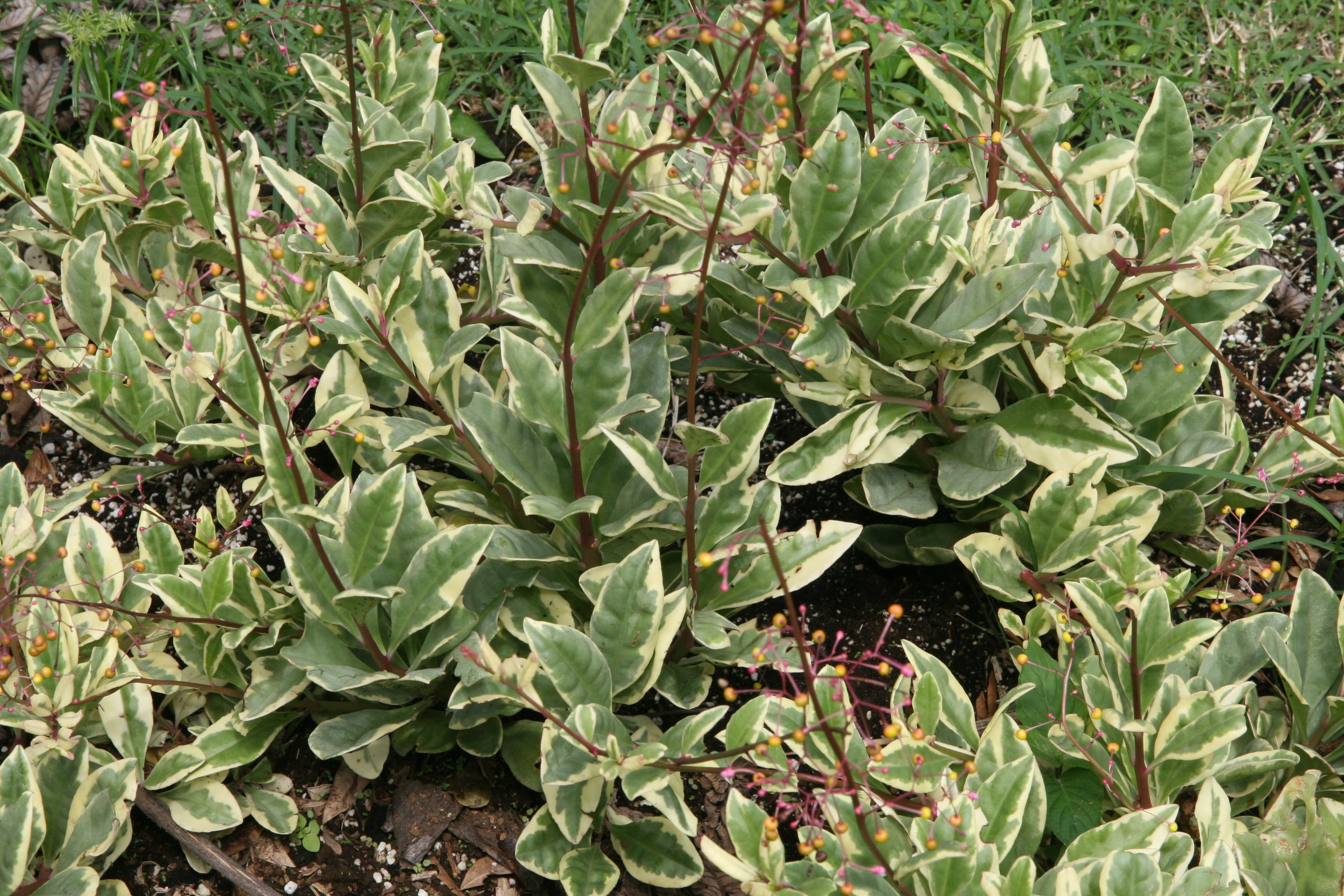
Variegated variety
