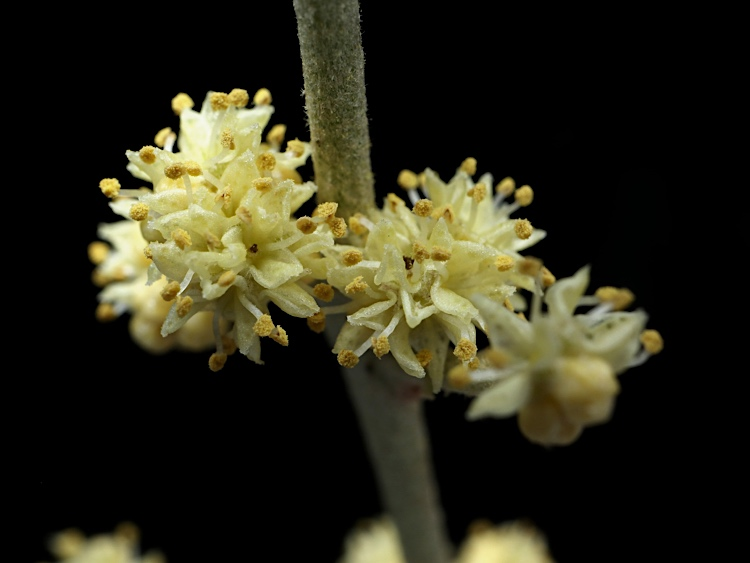
- In The Palmetum, Townsville

Conservation status
- Least Concern (IUCN 3.1)

Scientific classification
- Kingdom: Plantae
- Clade: Tracheophytes
- Clade: Angiosperms
- Clade: Eudicots
- Clade: Rosids
- Order: Sapindales
- Family: Rutaceae
- Genus: Lunasia; Blanco
- Species: L. amara

Binomial name
- Lunasia amara Blanco

Synonyms
- List: Androcephalium Warb.; Mytilicoccus Zoll.; Rabelaisia Planch.

= Lunasia =

Genus of flowering plants

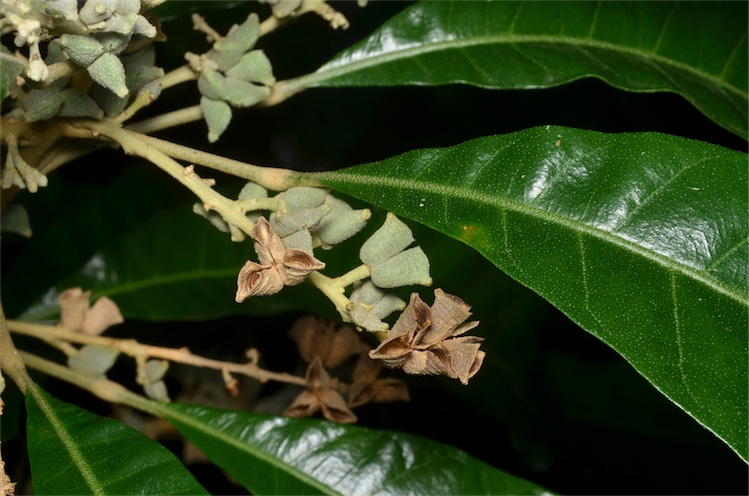
Fruit

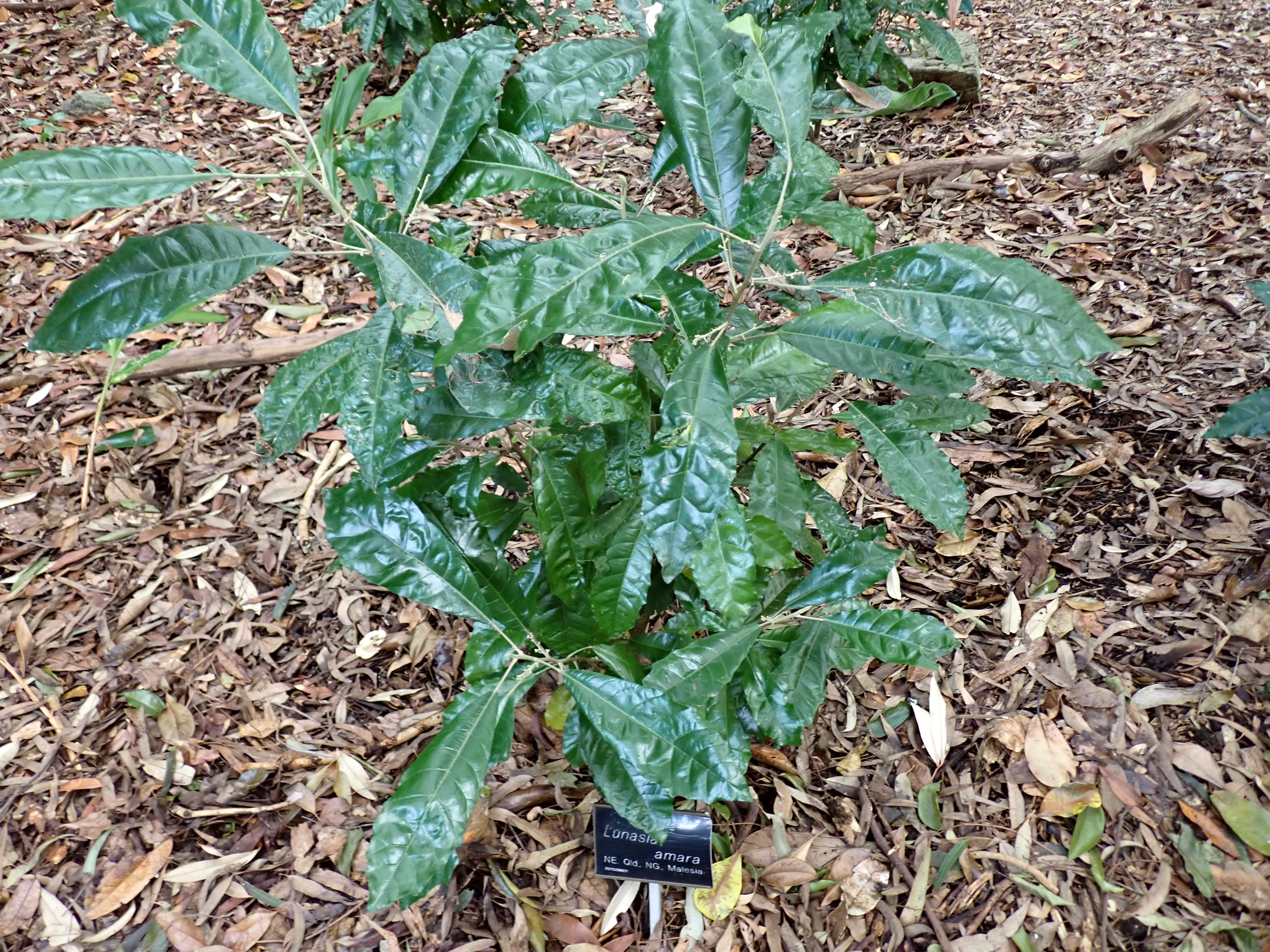
Foliage in Mount Coot-tha Botanic Gardens

Lunasia amara is the only species of flowering plant in the genus Lunasia of the family Rutaceae, and is native to Malesia, New Guinea, and Queensland. It is a dioecious shrub with simple leaves and head-like clusters of small flowers, the female flowers with larger petals than the male flowers. The fruit has up to 3 follicles joined at the base, each containing a single seed.

== Description ==
Lunasia amara is a shrub that typically grows to a height of 2–3 m (6 ft 7 in – 9 ft 10 in), sometimes a small tree, with its young shoots, twigs and leaves covered in star-shaped hairs or scales. The leaves are simple, narrowly egg-shaped with the narrower end towards the base, 55–60 mm (2.2–2.4 in) long with toothed or lobed edges and many oil dots. Separate male and female flowers are arranged in clusters about 3–6 mm (0.12–0.24 in) in diameter, the male flowers sessile with petals about 1 mm (0.039 in) long and 3 stamens. Female flowers are on a short pedicel, the petals 2.0–2.3 mm (0.079–0.091 in) long and densely hairy carpels with 1 ovule per locule and 3 styles. The fruit has up to 3 follicles 6–15 mm (0.24–0.59 in) long and 5–10 mm (0.20–0.39 in) long and joined at the base, each containing a single seed.

== Taxonomy ==
The genus Lunasia was first formally published in 1837 by Francisco Manuel Blanco and the first species he described was Lunasia amara. The descriptions were published in his book, Flora de Filipinas. The epithet Lunasia is a Tagalog word for L. amara.

== Distribution and habitat ==
Lunasia amara is found in the Philippines, south to East Java Borneo, New Guinea and in the Iron and McIlwraith Ranges in Queensland. It grows as an understorey plant in undisturbed rainforest.

== Uses ==
The plant is used in Malesia to treat skin disease and digestive disorders. Extracts from the bark have been used in New Guinea to treat tropical ulcers, and have been found to have antibacterial properties.
