= Poedua =

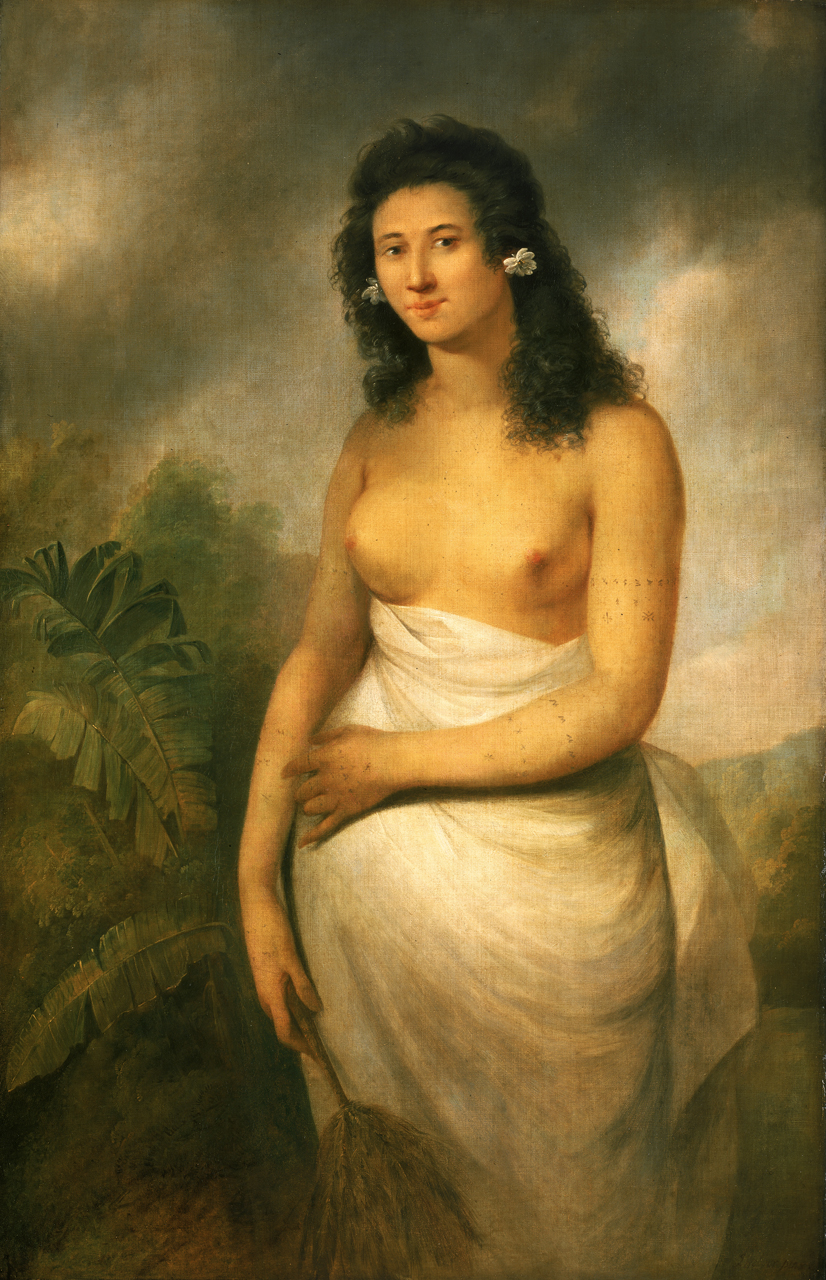
Princess Poedua by John Webber, 1777.

Poedua (circa 1758 – ?) was a princess, daughter of Orea (Orio), King of Ulietea (Raiatea). She was taken hostage together with her father, brother, and husband during the third voyage of James Cook in exchange for two sailors that had deserted onto the island. The hostages were enticed on board HMS Discovery and imprisoned until Orea secured the return of the deserters.

For many contemporaries John Webber's portrait of Poedua epitomized the sensual image of the South Sea maiden.
