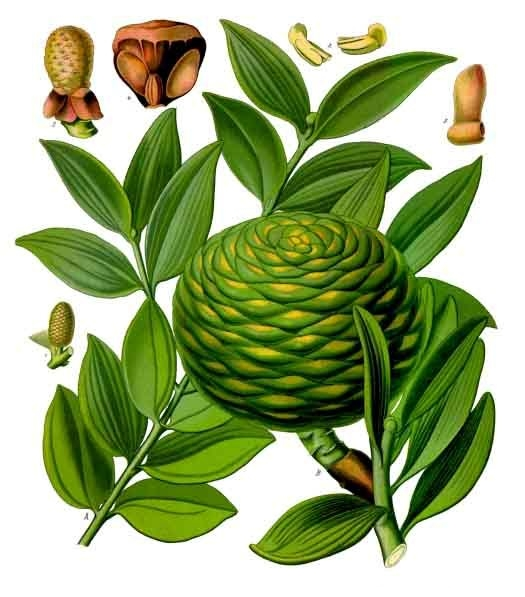

Conservation status
- Vulnerable (IUCN 3.1)

Scientific classification
- Kingdom: Plantae
- Clade: Tracheophytes
- Clade: Gymnosperms
- Division: Pinophyta
- Class: Pinopsida
- Order: Araucariales
- Family: Araucariaceae
- Genus: Agathis
- Species: A. dammara

Binomial name
- Agathis dammara (Lamb.) Poir.

Synonyms
- Agathis alba (Rumph. ex Hassk.) Foxw.; Agathis celebica (Koord.) Warb.; Agathis hamii Meijer Drees; Agathis loranthifolia Salisb.; Agathis orientalis (Lamb.) Mottet; Agathis philippinensis Warb.; Agathis pinus-dammara Poir.; Agathis regia Warb.; Dammara alba Rumph. ex Hassk.; Dammara celebica Koord.; Dammara loranthifolia Link; Dammara orientalis Lamb.; Dammara rumphii C.Presl; Abies dammara (Lamb.) Dum.Cours.; Pinus dammara Lamb.

= Agathis dammara =

Species of conifer

Agathis dammara, commonly known as the Amboina pine or dammar pine, is a coniferous tree in the family Araucariaceae, native to Sulawesi, the Maluku Islands and the Philippines.

== Description ==
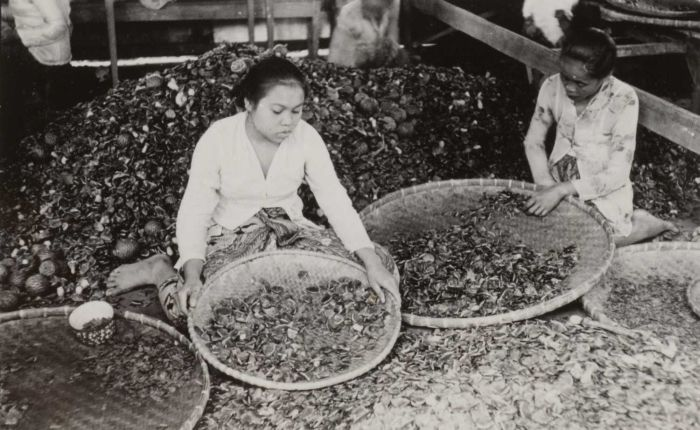
Women sorting dammar seeds in West Preanger, Java. 1936

Agathis dammara is a medium-large conifer that grows up to 60 m (200 ft) tall and 1.8 m (5 ft 11 in) diameter at breast height found in lowland to upland tropical rainforests as well as lowland to lower montane rainforests. It belongs to the family Araucariaceae, widespread throughout the Jurassic, Cretaceous and Paleogene periods and emerging in the Early Jurassic (around 201 Ma), but now confined to the southern hemisphere. Mature specimens are described as long clear boles with an emergent crown of first-order branches. The bark has been described to be of various gray tones and covered with resin blisters. The leaves have been described to be thick and highly variable in color in every tree. This tree is a source of dammar gum, also known as cat-eye resin, and is also used as timber.

== Taxonomy ==
When first discovered and listed as a species it was placed in the genus Pinus (Lambert, 1803), and then later with the firs, Abies (Poir 1817), and then with its own genus, Dammara. It was first recognised as being part of Agathis in 1807, when it was listed as Agathis loranthifolia, and beyond that with species names beccarii, celebica and macrostachys, although it acquired many more names before dammara was settled on.

Agathis celebica and Agathis philippinensis were previously considered distinct species but since 2010 have been synonymous with Agathis dammara.
