= Panorea =

Panorea (Greek: Πανωραία, lit. 'perfect beauty') is a female name of Greek origin. It is also sometimes used as an adjective.

== Etymology ==
Pan = above all, everything and Orea = this may mean either beautiful or great in height. According to the Lexicon of the New Greek Language (Babiniotis G., 1998 p.1327) beautiful is considered to be the dominant meaning, and therefore the word means most beautiful. However the second meaning (great in size) is also used in which case the word means greatest in height. This is because beauty and great size are often synonymous in some cases e.g. in its adjectival form when used to describe a mountain.
