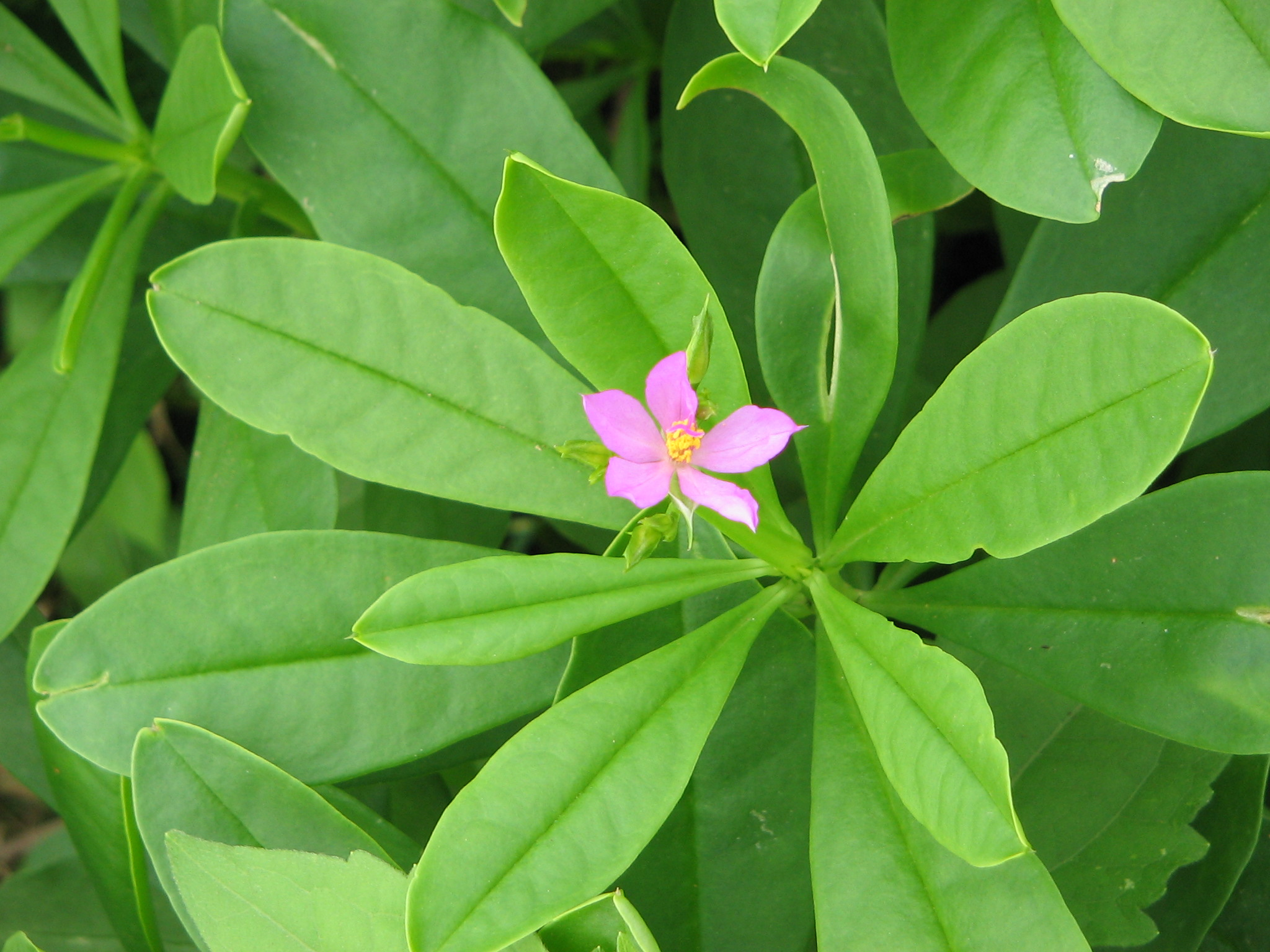
- Talinum fruticosum

Scientific classification
- Kingdom: Plantae
- Clade: Tracheophytes
- Clade: Angiosperms
- Clade: Eudicots
- Order: Caryophyllales
- Family: Talinaceae (Fenzl) Doweld

Genera
- Amphipetalum; Talinum (incl. Talinella)

= Talinaceae =

Family of flowering plants

Talinaceae is a family of two genera and 28 species of flowering plants comprising shrubs, lianas, and herbaceous species native to the Americas, Africa and Madagascar. The family is newly recognized through research by the Angiosperm Phylogeny Group III system to deal with long-standing phylogenetic difficulties in placing various genera within the Caryophyllales.
