= Astronia =

Scientific classification
- Kingdom: Plantae
- Clade: Tracheophytes
- Clade: Angiosperms
- Clade: Eudicots
- Clade: Rosids
- Order: Myrtales
- Family: Melastomataceae
- Genus: Astronia; Noronha

Genus of flowering plants

Astronia is a genus of flowering plants belonging to the family Melastomataceae.

Its native range is Tropical Asia and Taiwan.

Species:

- Astronia acuminatissima Merr.
- Astronia alata J.F.Maxwell
- Astronia angustifolia Mansf.
- Astronia apoensis Elmer
- Astronia arborea Baker f.
- Astronia atroviridis Mansf.
- Astronia beccariana Cogn.
- Astronia benguetensis J.F.Maxwell
- Astronia brunnea J.F.Maxwell
- Astronia brunneoaenea J.F.Maxwell
- Astronia bullata J.F.Maxwell
- Astronia candolleana Cogn.
- Astronia chartacea J.F.Maxwell
- Astronia columnaris J.F.Maxwell
- Astronia coriacea J.F.Maxwell
- Astronia corymbosa J.F.Maxwell
- Astronia crassiloba J.F.Maxwell
- Astronia cumingiana S.Vidal
- Astronia cuspidata J.F.Maxwell
- Astronia dioica Merr.
- Astronia elaterinervis J.F.Maxwell
- Astronia ferruginea Elmer
- Astronia gitingensis Elmer
- Astronia glauca Merr.
- Astronia glomerata Mansf.
- Astronia gracilis Bakh.f.
- Astronia grandiflora J.F.Maxwell
- Astronia hollrungii Cogn.
- Astronia katangladensis J.F.Maxwell
- Astronia klabatensis J.F.Maxwell
- Astronia laevis J.F.Maxwell
- Astronia lagunensis Merr.
- Astronia ledermannii Mansf.
- Astronia macrophylla Blume
- Astronia megalantha Merr.
- Astronia meyeri Merr.
- Astronia papetaria Blume
- Astronia papuana Cogn.
- Astronia pulchra S.Vidal
- Astronia quadrangulata J.F.Maxwell
- Astronia rolfei S.Vidal
- Astronia rostrata J.F.Maxwell
- Astronia rugata J.F.Maxwell
- Astronia rugosa J.F.Maxwell
- Astronia sabahensis J.F.Maxwell
- Astronia scabrida J.F.Maxwell
- Astronia sericea J.F.Maxwell
- Astronia shungolensis J.F.Maxwell
- Astronia smilacifolia Triana
- Astronia sorongensis J.F.Maxwell
- Astronia spectabilis Blume
- Astronia squamosa J.F.Maxwell
- Astronia stapfii Koord.
- Astronia triangularis J.F.Maxwell
- Astronia truncata J.F.Maxwell
- Astronia villosovaginata J.F.Maxwell
- Astronia viridifolia Elmer
- Astronia williamsii Merr. ex C.B.Rob.
