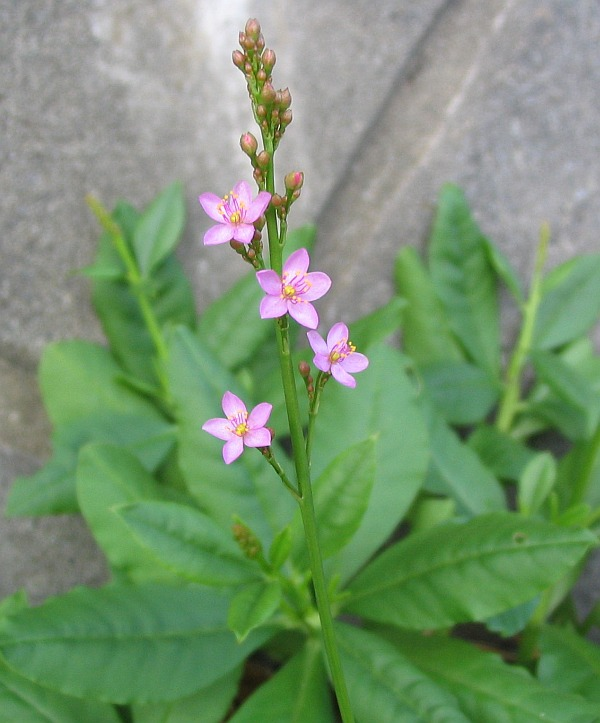

Scientific classification
- Kingdom: Plantae
- Clade: Tracheophytes
- Clade: Angiosperms
- Clade: Eudicots
- Order: Caryophyllales
- Family: Talinaceae
- Genus: Talinum
- Species: T. fruticosum

Binomial name
- Talinum fruticosum (L.) Juss.

Synonyms
- Portulaca fruticosa L. Portulaca triangularis Jacq. Talinum crassifolium (Jacq.) Willd. Talinum triangulare (Jacq.) Willd.

= Talinum fruticosum =

Species of plant

Talinum fruticosum is a herbaceous perennial plant that is native to Mexico, the Caribbean, West Africa, Central America, and much of South America. Common names include Ceylon spinach, waterleaf, cariru, Gbure, Surinam purslane, Philippine spinach, Florida spinach, potherb fameflower, sweetheart, and Kutu bataw in Ghana from the Akan language . In Nigeria it is known as Mgbolodi in Igbo, Efo Gbure in Yoruba, Alenyruwa in Hausa, and Moin-moin Ikong in Efik It is widely grown in tropical regions as a leaf vegetable. In the Mithila region of the Indian subcontinent, it is locally known as Raja Rani Saag.

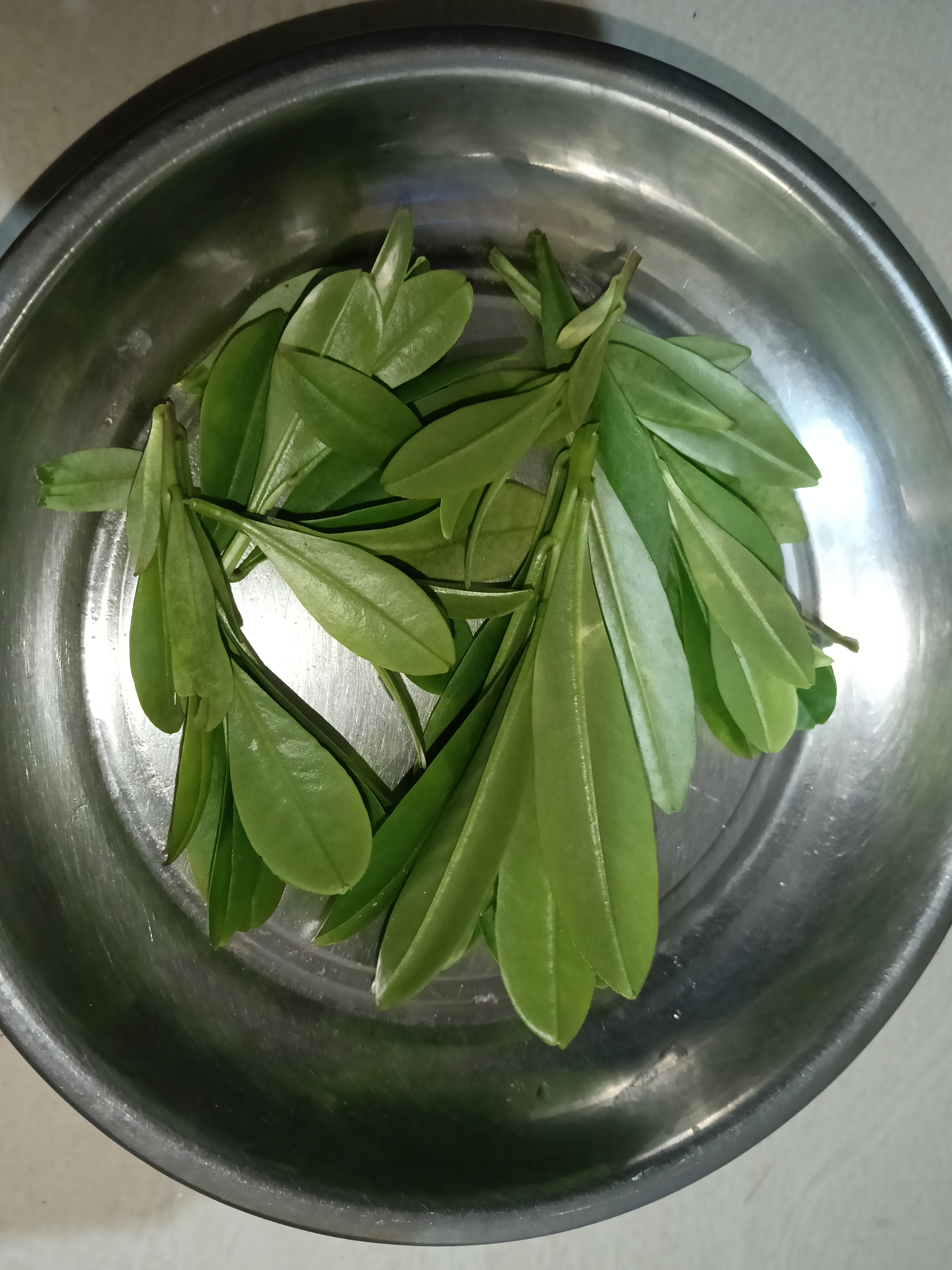
Raja Rani Saag kept for making Tarua.

== Description ==
The plant grows erect, reaching a height of 30 to 100 cm (12 to 39 in). It bears small, pink flowers and broad, fleshy leaves.

== Uses ==
As a leaf vegetable, T. fruticosum is rich in vitamins, including vitamins A and C, and minerals such as iron and calcium. Because it is high in oxalic acid, consumption should be avoided or limited by those suffering from kidney disorders, gout, and rheumatoid arthritis. It is cultivated in West Africa, South Asia, Southeast Asia, and the warmer parts of North and South America. In Brazil it is grown along the banks of the Amazon River, and is consumed mainly in the states of Pará and Amazonas.

In the Mithila region of the Indian subcontinent, its leaves are used to make vegetables and fritters.

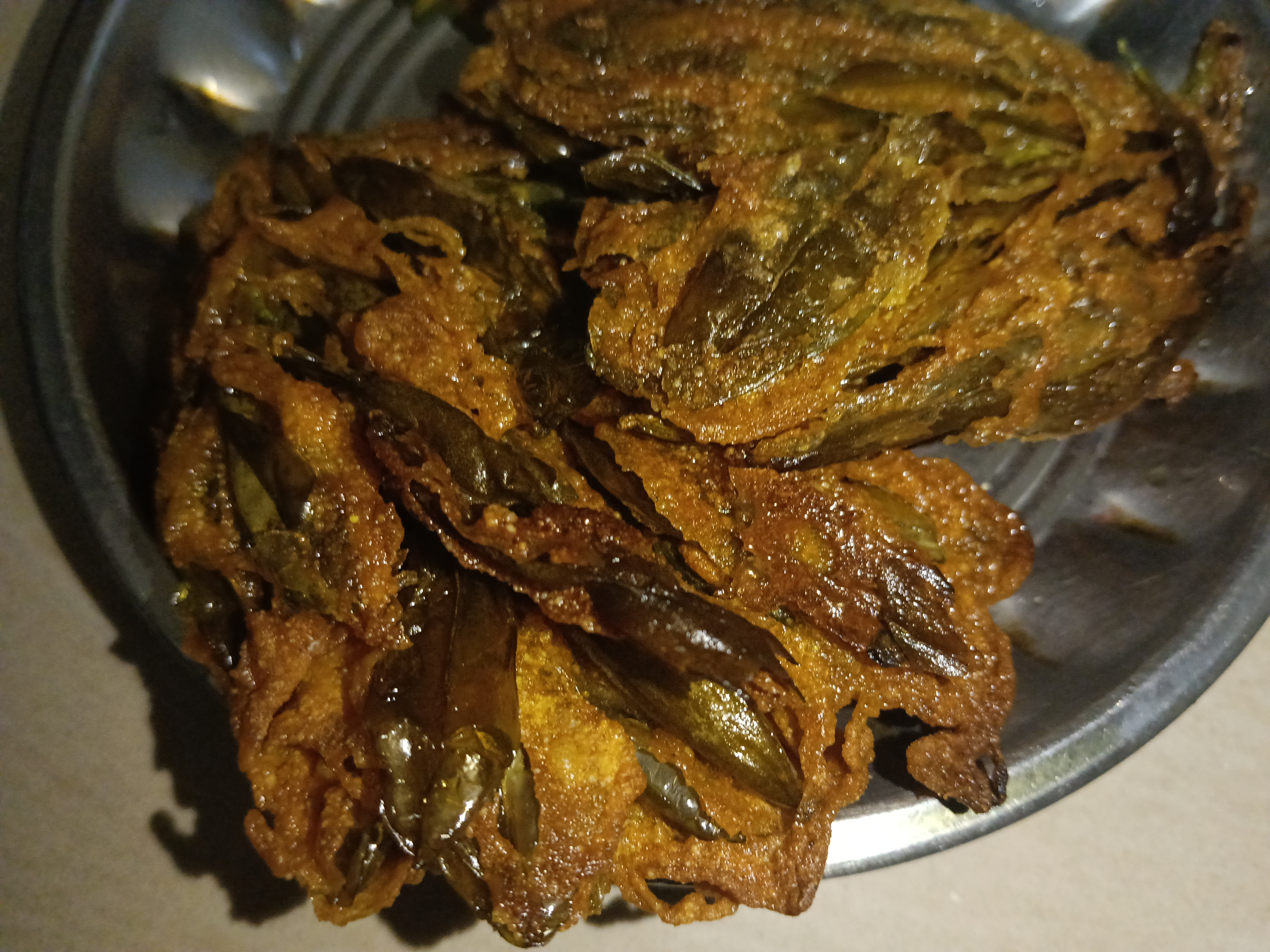
Fritter prepared from its leaves known as Raja Rani Saag Tarua by Maithil

== Gallery ==
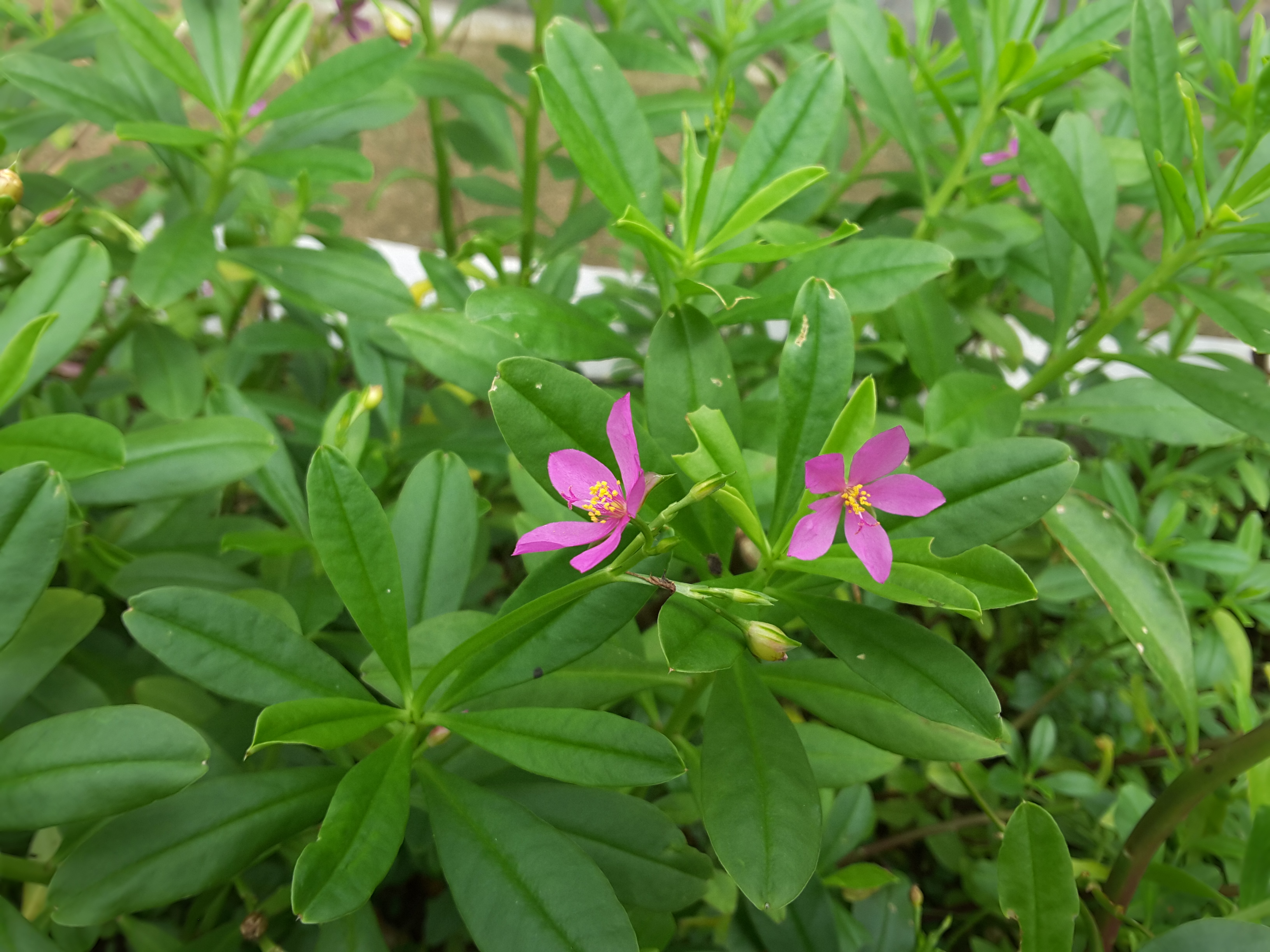
Talinum fruticosum in Singapore

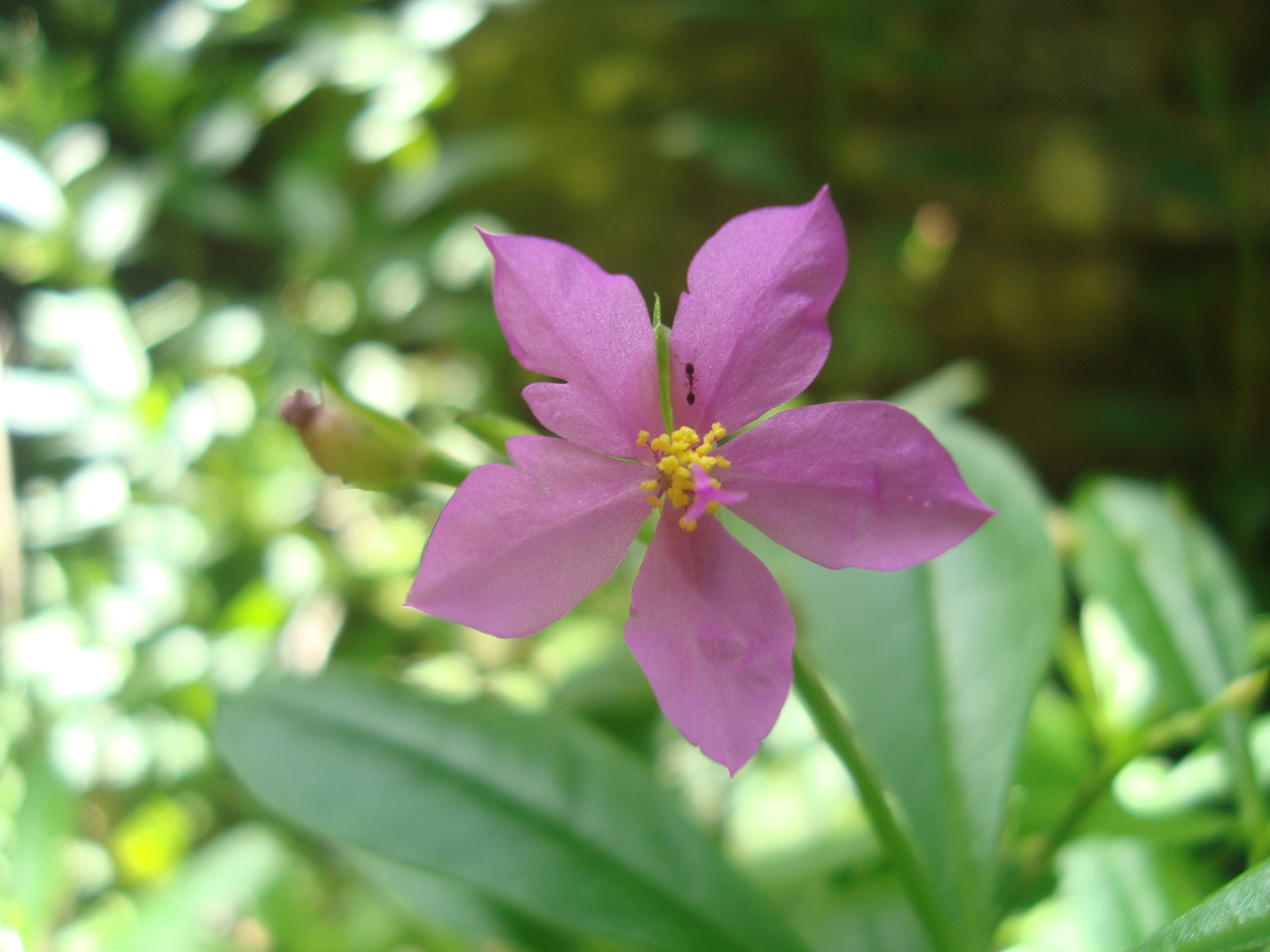
Talinum fruticosum in India

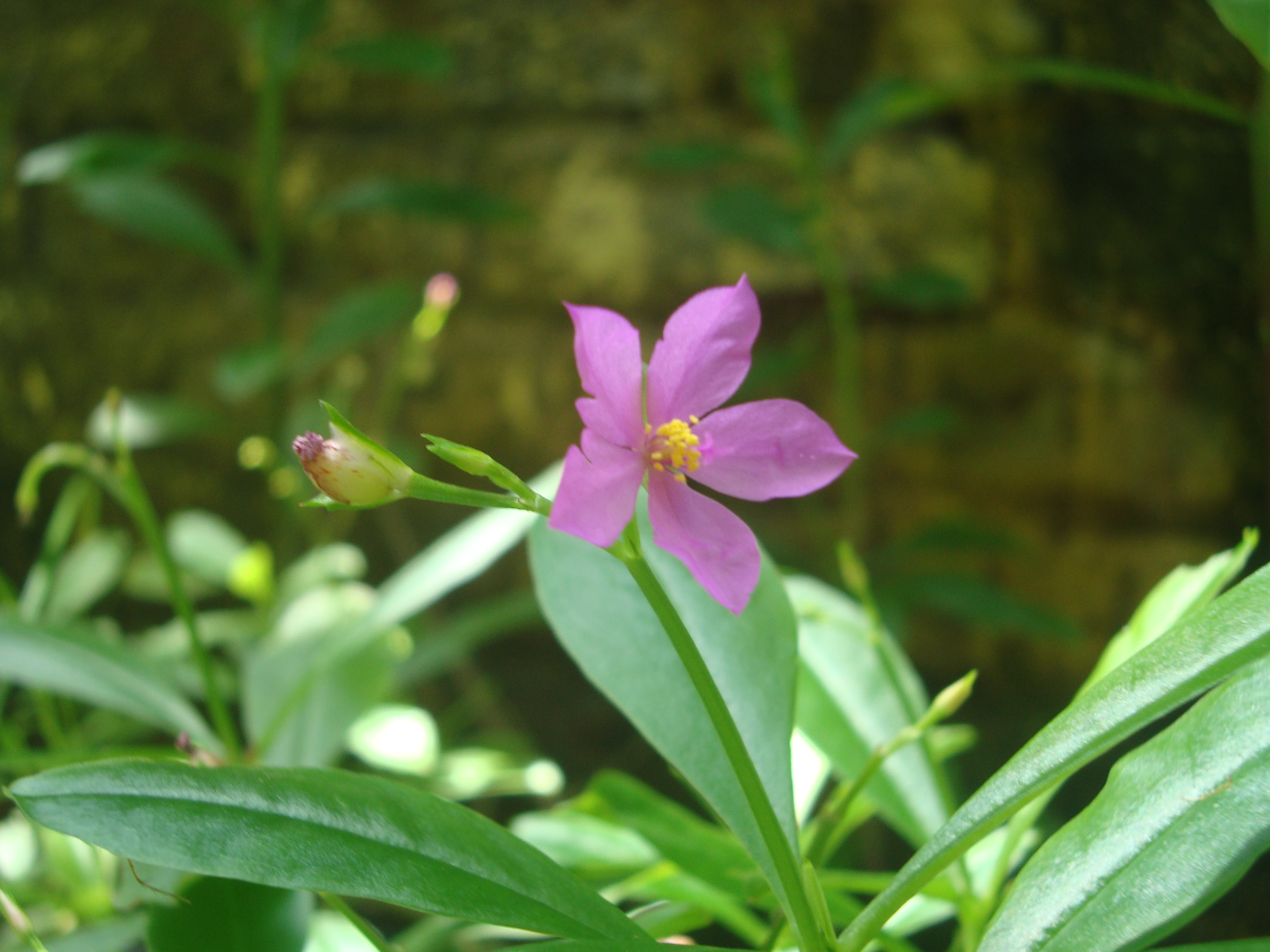
Talinum fruticosum with buds
