= Gahnia schoenoides =

Conservation status
- Least Concern (IUCN 3.1)

Scientific classification
- Kingdom: Plantae
- Clade: Tracheophytes
- Clade: Angiosperms
- Clade: Monocots
- Clade: Commelinids
- Order: Poales
- Family: Cyperaceae
- Genus: Gahnia
- Species: G. schoenoides

Binomial name
- Gahnia schoenoides G.Forst. (1786)

Species of plant

Gahnia schoenoides is a tussock-forming perennial in the family Cyperaceae, that is native to the Society Islands.
