= Eulechria zophoessa =

Scientific classification
- Kingdom: Animalia
- Phylum: Arthropoda
- Clade: Pancrustacea
- Class: Insecta
- Order: Lepidoptera
- Family: Oecophoridae
- Genus: Eulechria
- Species: E. zophoessa

Binomial name
- Eulechria zophoessa Meyrick, 1883

Species of moth endemic to New Zealand

Eulechria zophoessa is a moth of the family Oecophoridae. It was first described by Edward Meyrick in 1883. This species is endemic to New Zealand and has been observed in the North Island. This species frequents dry scrubby forest. The larva tunnels into the bark of the New Zealand endemic tree Fuchsia excorticata (kōtukutuku) and also dead beech trees during autumn and winter. It lives in an extremely tough, tight-fitting silken tube covered on the outside with minute particles of decayed wood. The pupa is enclosed in a silken tube within one of the burrows eaten out by the larva. Adults are on the wing from November to February but are most commonly observed in January. The colouring of the adult moth ensures it is well camouflaged when resting on its host plant.

== Taxonomy ==
This species was first described by Edward Meyrick in 1883 using a specimen he collected at the Wellington Botanic Garden in January. In 1927 Alfred Philpott discussed and illustrated the male genitalia of this species. George Hudson discussed and illustrated this species under that name in his 1928 book The butterflies and moths of New Zealand. The male holotype specimen is held at the Natural History Museum, London. The classification of New Zealand endemic moths within the genus Eulechria is regarded as unsatisfactory and in need of revision. As such this species is currently also known as Eulechria (s.l.) zophoessa.

== Description ==
Live moth.

Illustration of larva.

Meyrick originally described the adult male of this species as follows:

♂. 15 1/2 mm. Head fuscous, mixed with whitish-ochreous. Palpi dark fuscous, second joint whitish-ochreous internally and at extreme apex, apex of terminal joint whitish-ochreous. Antennae dark fuscous. Thorax dark fuscous, becoming ochreous posteriorly. Abdomen dark fuscous. Anterior and middle legs dark fuscous, tarsi whitish-ochreous beneath ; posterior legs dark grey, apex of tibise and tarsal joints whitish-ochreous. Forewings somewhat dilated, costa gently arched, apex rounded, hindmargin obliquely rounded ; fuscous, slightly reddish-tinged, basal 3/5 irregularly mixed and suffused with whitish-ochreous, and thinly irrorated with dark fuscous, hindmargin rather broadly suffused with dark fuscous ; a small dark fuscous spot at base of costa, and another at base of inner margin ; a small dark fuscous spot in disc before middle, a second in disc beyond middle, and a third almost directly beneath first on fold ; first and second connected by a clear whitish-ochreous line, beneath which is a fourth similar spot between them ; a small dark fuscous spot on costa at 3/5, its apex suffusedly confluent with second discal spot ; a very indistinct suffused strongly curved dark fuscous line from 3/4 of costa to anal angle, beneath closely approximating to hindmargin : cilia dark fuscous-grey, mixed with whitish-ochreous. Hindwings dark grey ; cilia grey, with a dark grey line near base.

Meyrick regarded E. zophoessa as a very distinct species. The colouring ensures the moth is well camouflaged when resting on its host plant.

Hudson described the larva of this species as follows:

The length of this larva when full-grown is about 7/8 inch; it is cylindrical and extremely slender; the head is minute, reddish-brown; the second segment also minute blackish-brown and polished; the third segment is slightly swollen with a blackish horny plate on each side; the fourth segment is soft, brownish yellow; the rest of the larva is brownish-yellow, with the segmental divisions clearly marked in blackish-brown; the whole larva has a somewhat velvety appearance; the last two segments are much shorter than the others, the terminal segment being blackish-brown and horny.

== Distribution ==
E. zophoessa is endemic to New Zealand. It has been observed in the North Island only.

== Habitat and hosts ==
This species frequents dry scrubby forest. Larvae have been observed tunnelling into the bark of the New Zealand endemic tree Fuchsia excorticata (kōtukutuku) during autumn and winter. They have also been seen tunnelling into the bark of a dead beech tree.

== Life cycle and behaviour ==
The larva lives in an extremely tough, tight-fitting silken tube covered on the outside with minute particles of decayed wood. This tube is very tough and ensures any predators would have great difficulty in extracting the enclosed larva. The pupa is enclosed in a silken tube within one of the burrows eaten out by the larva. Adults are on the wing from November to February but are most commonly observed in January.
