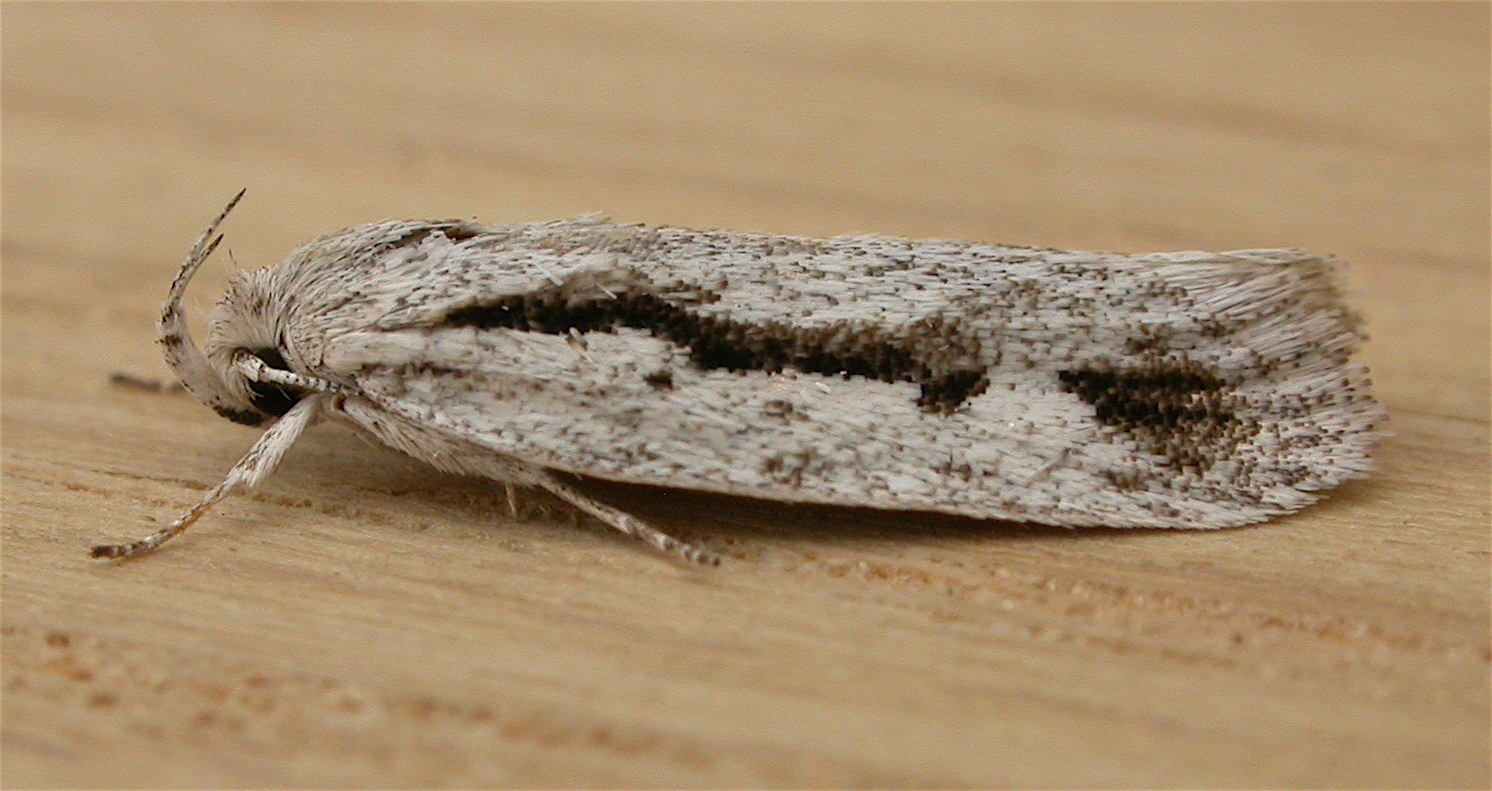

Scientific classification
- Kingdom: Animalia
- Phylum: Arthropoda
- Clade: Pancrustacea
- Class: Insecta
- Order: Lepidoptera
- Family: Oecophoridae
- Genus: Eulechria
- Species: E. encratodes

Binomial name
- Eulechria encratodes Meyrick (1884)

= Eulechria encratodes =

Species of moth

Eulechria encratodes is a species of moth in the family Gelechioidea that occurs in Australia.
