= Eulechria cocytias =

Scientific classification
- Kingdom: Animalia
- Phylum: Arthropoda
- Class: Insecta
- Order: Lepidoptera
- Family: Oecophoridae
- Genus: Eulechria
- Species: E. cocytias

Binomial name
- Eulechria cocytias (Meyrick, 1915)

Synonyms
- Scalideutis cocytias Meyrick, 1915

Species of moth

Eulechria cocytias is a moth in the family Oecophoridae. It was described by Edward Meyrick in 1915. It is found in Australia, where it has been recorded from Queensland and Victoria.
