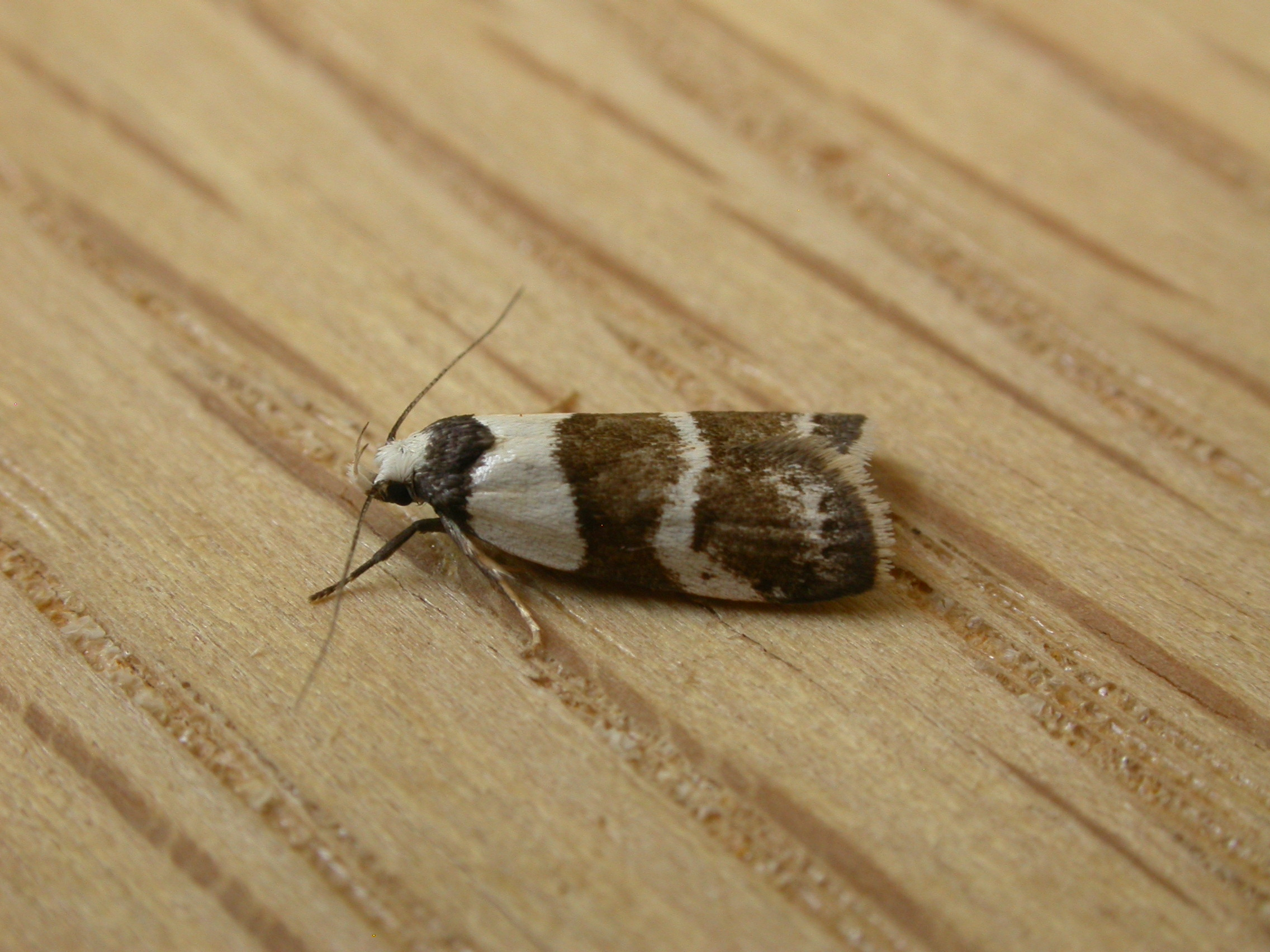

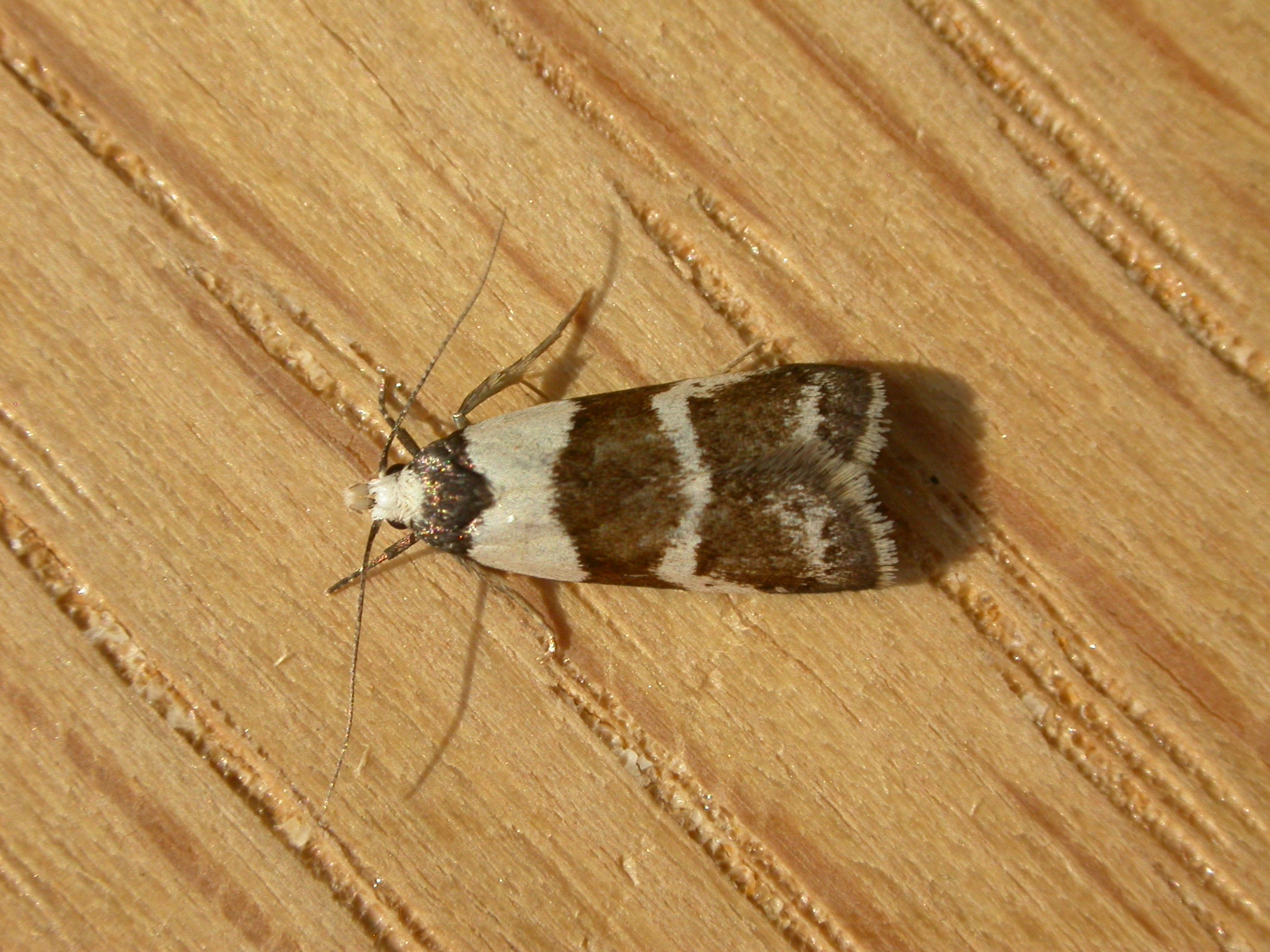

Scientific classification
- Kingdom: Animalia
- Phylum: Arthropoda
- Class: Insecta
- Order: Lepidoptera
- Family: Oecophoridae
- Genus: Eulechria
- Species: E. triferella

Binomial name
- Eulechria triferella (Walker, 1864)

Synonyms
- Oecophora triferella Walker, 1864

= Eulechria triferella =

Species of moth

Eulechria triferella is a moth of the family Oecophoridae. It is known from the Australian states of New South Wales and Queensland.

The larvae feed on the dead leaves of Eucalyptus species. They can be found in dead leaf litter.
