= Eulechria pastea =

Scientific classification
- Kingdom: Animalia
- Phylum: Arthropoda
- Class: Insecta
- Order: Lepidoptera
- Family: Oecophoridae
- Genus: Eulechria
- Species: E. pastea

Binomial name
- Eulechria pastea (Turner, 1927)

Synonyms
- Machimia pastea Turner, 1927

Species of moth

Eulechria pastea is a moth in the family Oecophoridae. It was described by Alfred Jefferis Turner in 1927. It is found in Australia, where it has been recorded from Tasmania.
