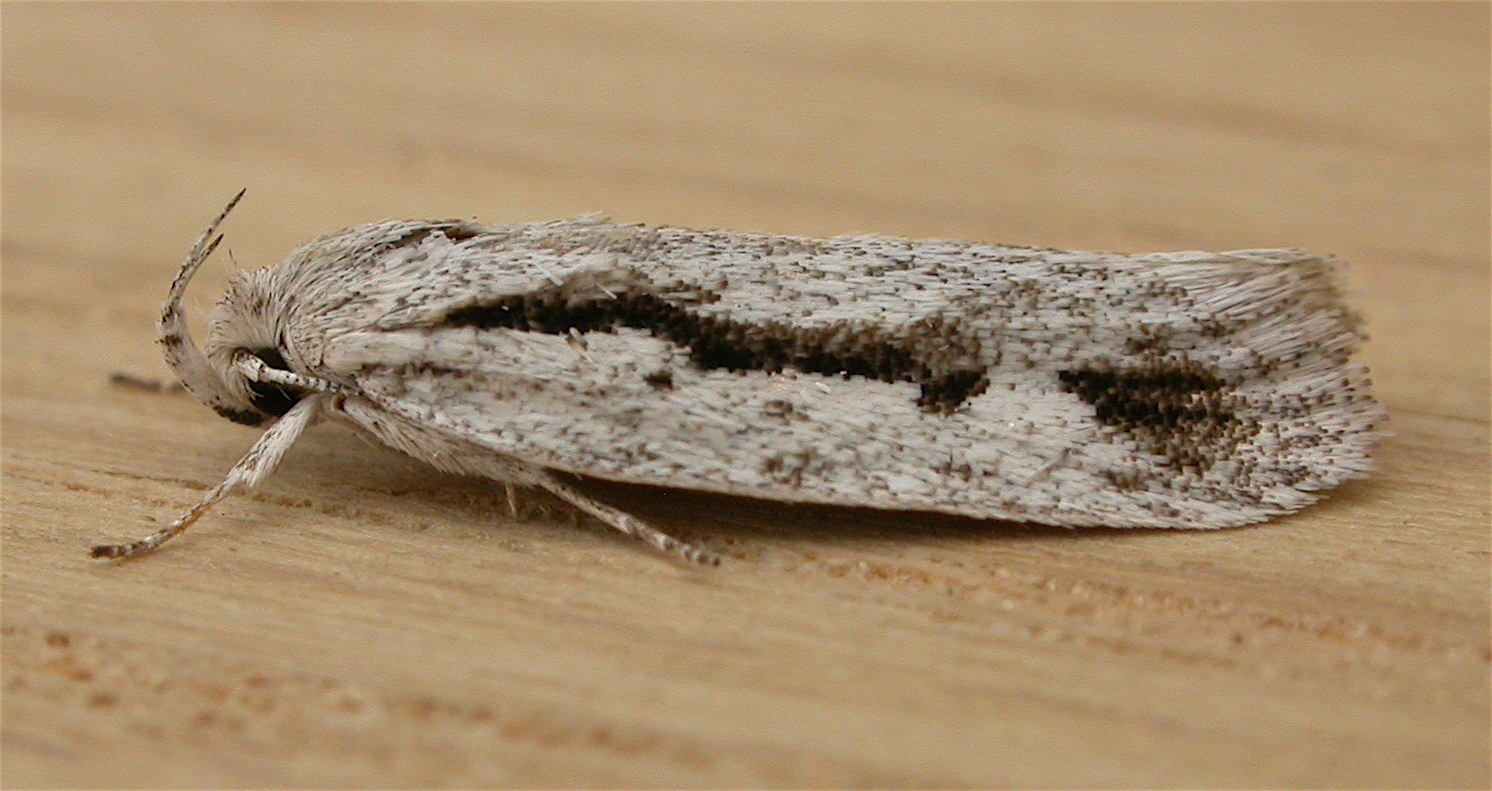
- Eulechria encratodes in Australia

Scientific classification
- Kingdom: Animalia
- Phylum: Arthropoda
- Class: Insecta
- Order: Lepidoptera
- Family: Oecophoridae
- Subfamily: Oecophorinae
- Genus: Eulechria; Meyrick, 1883

Species
- See text.

Synonyms
- Eriodyta Meyrick, 1883; Cormotypa Meyrick, 1914; Utidana Turner, 1935; Utidana Turner, 1935

= Eulechria =

Genus of moths

Eulechria is a genus of moths of the family Oecophoridae.

== Species ==
- Eulechria absona (Turner, 1917)
- Eulechria aclina (Turner, 1932)
- Eulechria acrotropa (Meyrick, 1884)
- Eulechria adoxodes (Turner, 1933)
- Eulechria ancyrota (Meyrick, 1883)
- Eulechria aphaura Meyrick, 1888
- Eulechria arctans (Lucas, 1900)
- Eulechria argolina (Meyrick, 1889)
- Eulechria atmospila Turner, 1916
- Eulechria auantis (Meyrick, 1889)
- Eulechria autographa (Meyrick, 1902)
- Eulechria balanota (Meyrick, 1889)
- Eulechria basiplaga (Walker, 1863)
- Eulechria calamaea (Turner, 1935)
- Eulechria callidesma (Lower, 1894)
- Eulechria capsellata Meyrick, 1913
- Eulechria catharistis Turner, 1916
- Eulechria celata Meyrick, 1913
- Eulechria ceratina (Meyrick, 1884)
- Eulechria ceratochroa Lower, 1920
- Eulechria cerinata Meyrick, 1914
- Eulechria chersomicta (Meyrick, 1920)
- Eulechria chionospila (Turner, 1941)
- Eulechria chrysodeta (Turner, 1941)
- Eulechria chrysomochla Turner, 1937
- Eulechria chrysozona (Turner, 1896)
- Eulechria clytophanes (Turner, 1941)
- Eulechria cocytias (Meyrick, 1915)
- Eulechria colonialis Meyrick, 1936
- Eulechria contentella (Walker, 1864)
- Eulechria convictella (Walker, 1864)
- Eulechria corsota Meyrick, 1914
- Eulechria delicia (Turner, 1917)
- Eulechria delospila Turner, 1916
- Eulechria delosticta (Turner, 1944)
- Eulechria diacrita (Turner, 1917)
- Eulechria diasticha Turner, 1937
- Eulechria diaphanes Turner, 1898
- Eulechria dichroa (Lower, 1893)
- Eulechria dolichotricha (Turner, 1927)
- Eulechria drosocapna Meyrick, 1920
- Eulechria dysimera Turner, 1938
- Eulechria eborinella (Snellen, 1901)
- Eulechria elaphropa (Turner, 1936)
- Eulechria electrodes (Meyrick, 1884)
- Eulechria empheres Turner, 1938
- Eulechria encratodes Meyrick, 1922
- Eulechria epicausta Meyrick, 1883
- Eulechria epimicta (Meyrick, 1886)
- Eulechria eremnopa (Turner, 1917)
- Eulechria eriphila Meyrick, 1888
- Eulechria euadelpha (Lower, 1901)
- Eulechria eucrita (Turner, 1917)
- Eulechria eurycneca Turner, 1937
- Eulechria eurygramma Turner, 1915
- Eulechria exanimis Meyrick, 1883
- Eulechria gypsochroa Turner, 1937
- Eulechria habrosema (Turner, 1944)
- Eulechria haplopepla Turner, 1938
- Eulechria haplophara (Turner, 1915)
- Eulechria haplopolia Turner, 1938
- Eulechria haplosticta Turner, 1938
- Eulechria heliocoma Meyrick, 1888
- Eulechria heliodora Meyrick, 1888
- Eulechria heliophanes (Lower, 1894)
- Eulechria hemiochra (Turner, 1935)
- Eulechria hemisphaerica (Meyrick, 1886)
- Eulechria hilda (Turner, 1917)
- Eulechria holodascia Turner, 1938
- Eulechria homochra Turner, 1938
- Eulechria homopela (Turner, 1933)
- Eulechria homophyes (Turner, 1941)
- Eulechria homospora Meyrick, 1913
- Eulechria homoteles Meyrick, 1888
- Eulechria homotona (Meyrick, 1884)
- Eulechria hymenaea Meyrick, 1902
- Eulechria increta Meyrick, 1931
- Eulechria ischnota (Lower, 1903)
- Eulechria isogramma (Meyrick, 1884)
- Eulechria isozona (Lower, 1901)
- Eulechria jugata Meyrick, 1914
- Eulechria leptobela Meyrick, 1883
- Eulechria leptocneca (Turner, 1933)
- Eulechria leptopasta Turner, 1938
- Eulechria leptosema Common, 1996
- Eulechria lissophanes Turner, 1938
- Eulechria lissopolia (Turner, 1927)
- Eulechria lunata (Turner, 1896)
- Eulechria machinosa Meyrick, 1913
- Eulechria malacoptera Meyrick, 1888
- Eulechria malacostola (Turner, 1941)
- Eulechria marmorata (Meyrick, 1889)
- Eulechria mechanica (Meyrick, 1889)
- Eulechria melanoploca (Meyrick, 1884)
- Eulechria melesella (Newman, 1856)
- Eulechria metacroca (Turner, 1944)
- Eulechria metarga (Turner, 1939)
- Eulechria micranepsia Turner, 1938
- Eulechria microschema (Meyrick, 1883)
- Eulechria modesta (Turner, 1944)
- Eulechria nephelella (Turner, 1898)
- Eulechria nigricincta (Meyrick, 1921)
- Eulechria niphobola Lower, 1920
- Eulechria omosema Meyrick, 1920
- Eulechria ophiodes (Meyrick, 1889)
- Eulechria orbitalis Meyrick, 1922
- Eulechria orbitosa Meyrick, 1920
- Eulechria orestera (Turner, 1917)
- Eulechria orgiastis (Meyrick, 1889)
- Eulechria oxytona (Turner, 1916)
- Eulechria pallidella Meyrick, 1883
- Eulechria pantelella Meyrick, 1883
- Eulechria pastea (Turner, 1927)
- Eulechria paurophylla (Turner, 1916)
- Eulechria pelina Turner, 1938
- Eulechria pelodora Meyrick, 1888
- Eulechria pentamera (Lower, 1893)
- Eulechria pentatypa (Turner, 1941)
- Eulechria perdita Meyrick, 1883
- Eulechria periphanes (Turner, 1944)
- Eulechria permeata (Meyrick, 1913)
- Eulechria phaeina (Turner, 1896)
- Eulechria phaeopsamma Meyrick, 1913
- Eulechria phoenissa Meyrick, 1902
- Eulechria pissograpta Turner, 1938
- Eulechria placina (Turner, 1939)
- Eulechria platyrrhabda Turner, 1937
- Eulechria polioleuca (Turner, 1933)
- Eulechria psaritis (Turner, 1933)
- Eulechria psilopla (Meyrick, 1884)
- Eulechria pulverea (Meyrick, 1884)
- Eulechria pyrgophora (Turner, 1941)
- Eulechria rhymodes Meyrick, 1914
- Eulechria roborata Meyrick, 1914
- Eulechria salsicola Meyrick, 1914
- Eulechria sciaphila Turner, 1927
- Eulechria sciosticha (Turner, 1941)
- Eulechria semophanes (Meyrick, 1889)
- Eulechria sigmophora (Meyrick, 1884)
- Eulechria sphaeroides (Turner, 1896)
- Eulechria sphodra (Turner, 1941)
- Eulechria spreta Turner, 1939
- Eulechria stadiota (Meyrick, 1889)
- Eulechria stigmatophora Turner, 1896
- Eulechria stoechodes (Turner, 1936)
- Eulechria subpunctella (Walker, 1864)
- Eulechria suffusa (Turner, 1936)
- Eulechria symbleta (Turner, 1914)
- Eulechria syngenes (Turner, 1941)
- Eulechria tanysticha Turner, 1937
- Eulechria tephrochroa Turner, 1916
- Eulechria theorica (Meyrick, 1884)
- Eulechria thermochroa (Meyrick, 1884)
- Eulechria theticophara Turner, 1938
- Eulechria thiopepla (Turner, 1939)
- Eulechria threnodes Turner, 1916
- Eulechria timida Meyrick, 1914
- Eulechria tolmera (Turner, 1941)
- Eulechria triferella (Walker, 1864)
- Eulechria typicantha Meyrick, 1918
- Eulechria vaporata Meyrick, 1914
- Eulechria vegrandis (Meyrick, 1884)
- Eulechria velata Meyrick, 1914
- Eulechria xanthophylla Turner, 1937
- Eulechria xenomima (Meyrick, 1913)
- Eulechria xeropterella Common, 1996
- Eulechria xuthophylla Turner, 1937
- Eulechria xuthoptila Turner, 1938
- Eulechria zophoessa Meyrick, 1883
- Eulechria zophoptera Turner, 1938
- Eulechria zoropa Turner, 1938
- Eulechria leucochrysa (Diakonoff, 1954)
- Eulechria messoria (Meyrick, 1914)
- Eulechria mitrocosma (Turner, 1941)
- Eulechria abrithes (Turner, 1936)
- Eulechria amaloptera (Turner, 1936)
- Eulechria autophylla Meyrick, 1888
- Eulechria basipuncta Turner, 1938
- Eulechria basixantha Turner, 1938
- Eulechria centridias Meyrick, 1920
- Eulechria centroleuca Turner, 1938
- Eulechria cholerodes Meyrick, 1888
- Eulechria delotypa (Turner, 1936)
- Eulechria diagramma Meyrick, 1888
- Eulechria dyspines (Turner, 1936)
- Eulechria epichrista Turner, 1937
- Eulechria griseola (Zeller, 1855)
- Eulechria haemopa Turner, 1938
- Eulechria halmopeda Meyrick, 1888
- Eulechria homochalca Meyrick, 1888
- Eulechria homoxesta Meyrick, 1888
- Eulechria hypnotis (Meyrick, 1889)
- Eulechria indecora Turner, 1938
- Eulechria infestata Meyrick, 1914
- Eulechria isopsepha Meyrick, 1914
- Eulechria maesta Turner, 1938
- Eulechria monoda Lower, 1907
- Eulechria paraleuca Lower, 1907
- Eulechria pentasticta (Turner, 1936)
- Eulechria phaeogramma (Turner, 1936)
- Eulechria photinopis Lower, 1900
- Eulechria pleurocapna (Turner, 1936)
- Eulechria plinthochroa Turner, 1938
- Eulechria pusilla (Turner, 1936)
- Eulechria quaerenda Meyrick, 1920
- Eulechria scioides Turner, 1937
- Eulechria scotiodes Meyrick, 1902
- Eulechria semelella (Newman, 1856)
- Eulechria semnostola (Lower, 1901)
- Eulechria sericopa (Lower, 1915)
- Eulechria stenoptila (Turner, 1917)
- Eulechria stramenticia (Turner, 1936)
- Eulechria styracista Meyrick, 1920
- Eulechria suppletella (Walker, 1864)
- Eulechria synaptospila Turner, 1938
- Eulechria tetraploa Turner, 1896
- Eulechria themerodes (Meyrick, 1902)
- Eulechria zemiodes Meyrick, 1902
- Eulechria zophoessa Meyrick, 1883
