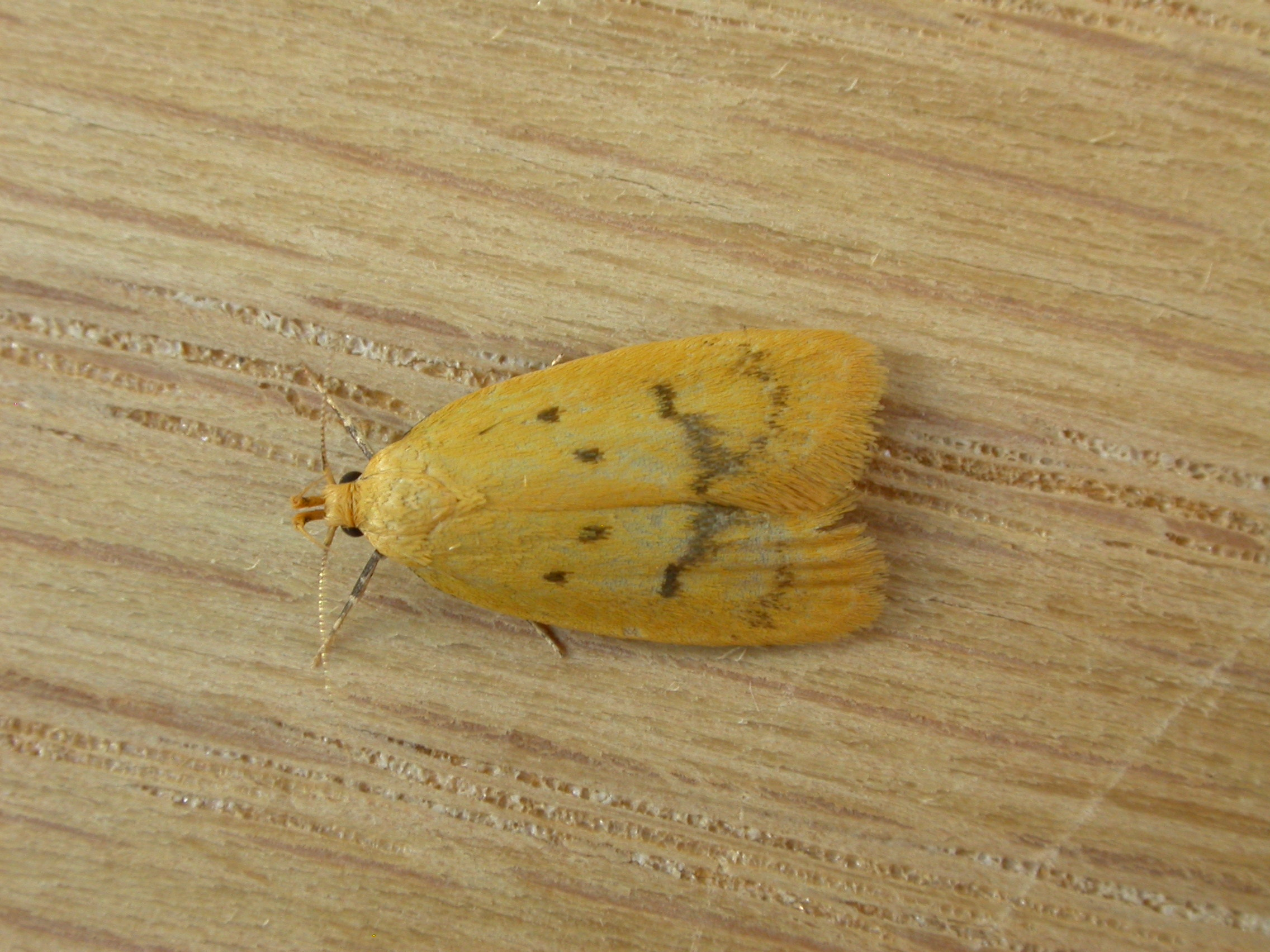

Scientific classification
- Kingdom: Animalia
- Phylum: Arthropoda
- Class: Insecta
- Order: Lepidoptera
- Family: Oecophoridae
- Genus: Eulechria
- Species: E. subpunctella

Binomial name
- Eulechria subpunctella Walker, 1864

Synonyms
- Oecophora subpunctella

= Eulechria subpunctella =

Species of moth

Eulechria subpunctella is a moth of the family Oecophoridae. It is found in Australia.
