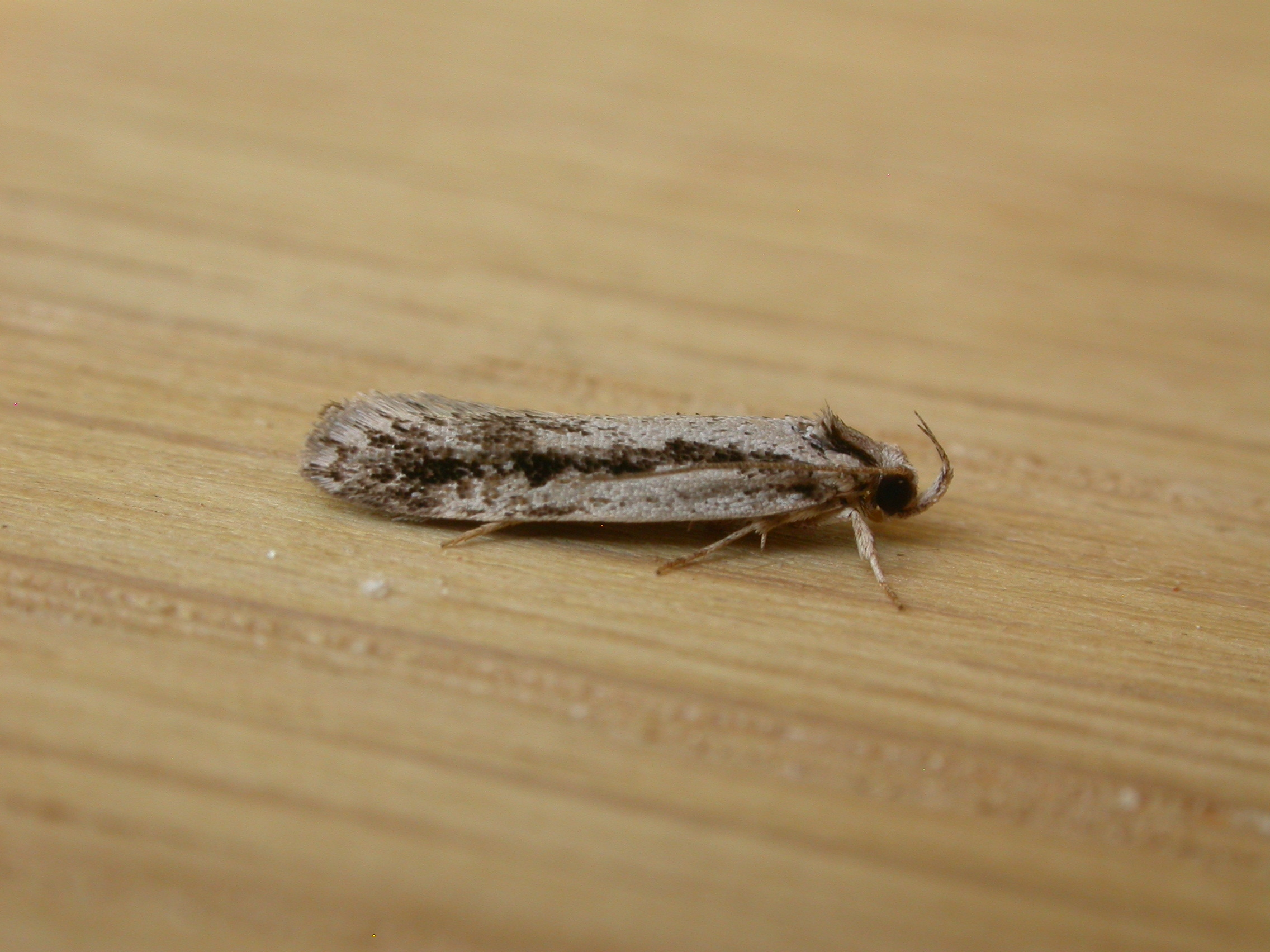

Scientific classification
- Kingdom: Animalia
- Phylum: Arthropoda
- Class: Insecta
- Order: Lepidoptera
- Family: Oecophoridae
- Genus: Eulechria
- Species: E. xeropterella

Binomial name
- Eulechria xeropterella Common, 1996

= Eulechria xeropterella =

Species of moth

Eulechria xeropterella is a moth of the family Oecophoridae. It is found in Australia in the Australian Capital Territory, New South Wales, Queensland, Victoria and Tasmania.
