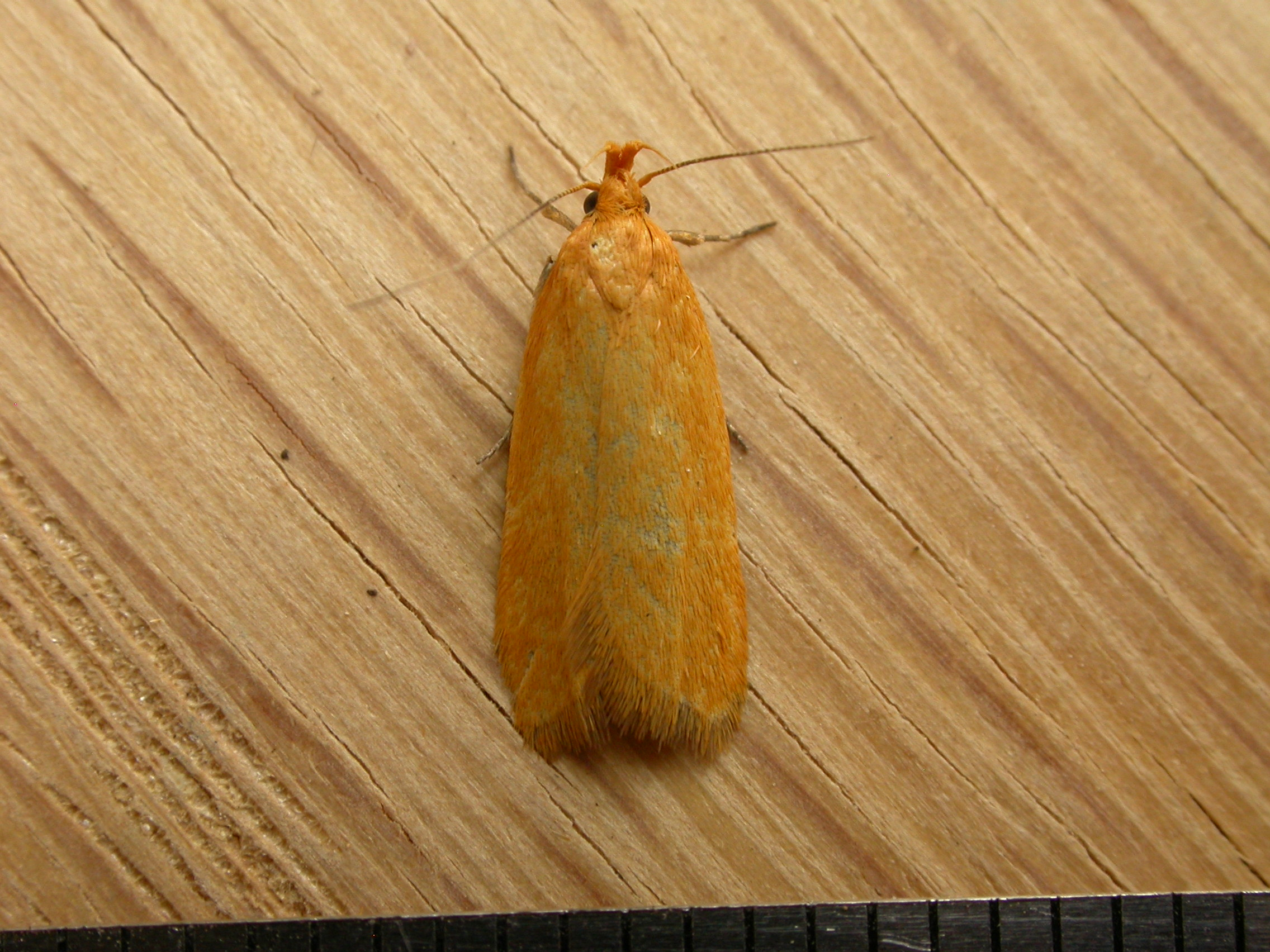

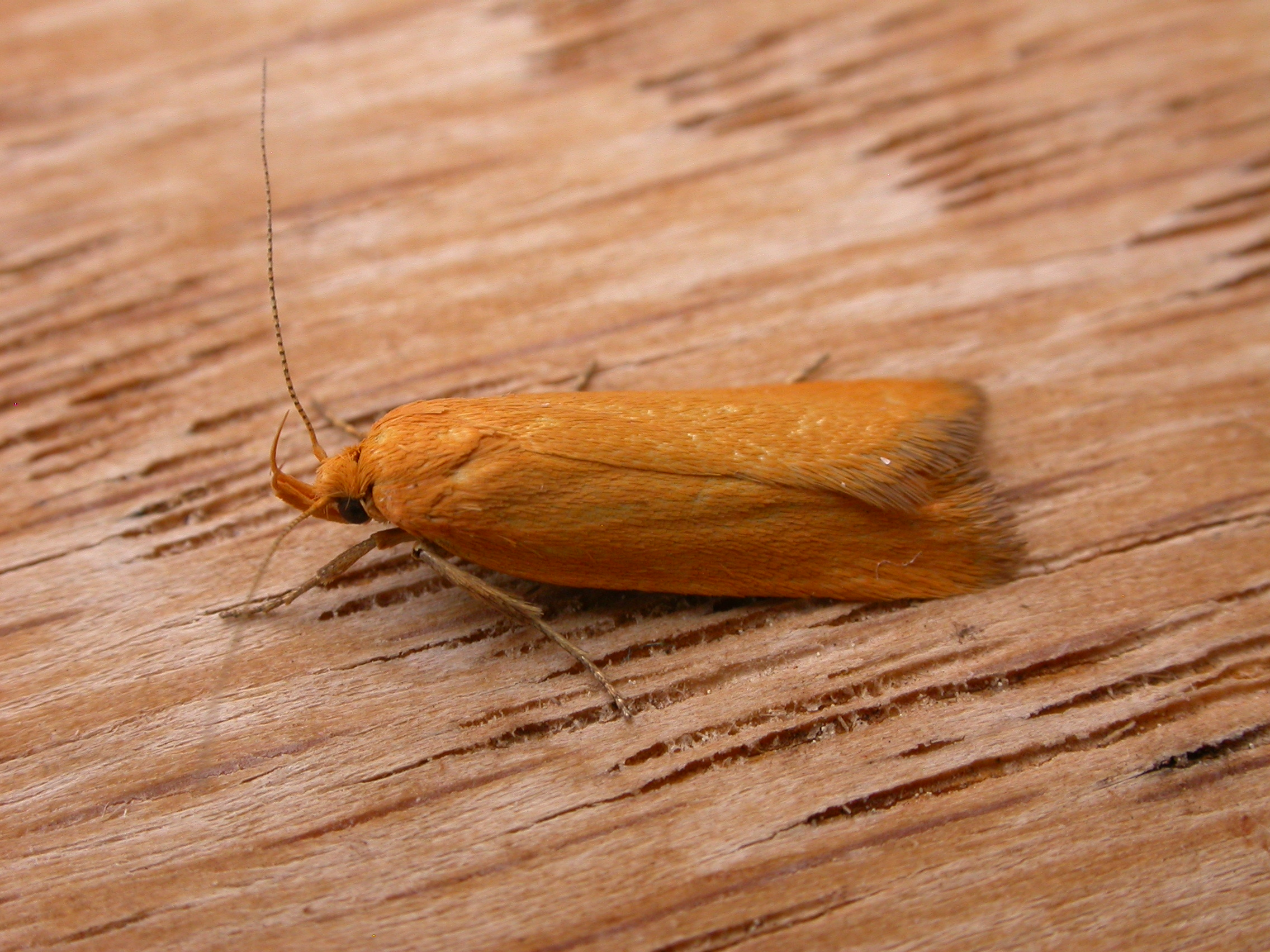

Scientific classification
- Kingdom: Animalia
- Phylum: Arthropoda
- Class: Insecta
- Order: Lepidoptera
- Family: Oecophoridae
- Genus: Eulechria
- Species: E. electrodes

Binomial name
- Eulechria electrodes (Meyrick, 1884)

Synonyms
- Philobota electrodes Meyrick, 1884

= Eulechria electrodes =

Species of moth

Eulechria electrodes is a moth of the family Oecophoridae. It is known from the Australian Capital Territory, New South Wales, Queensland and Victoria.
