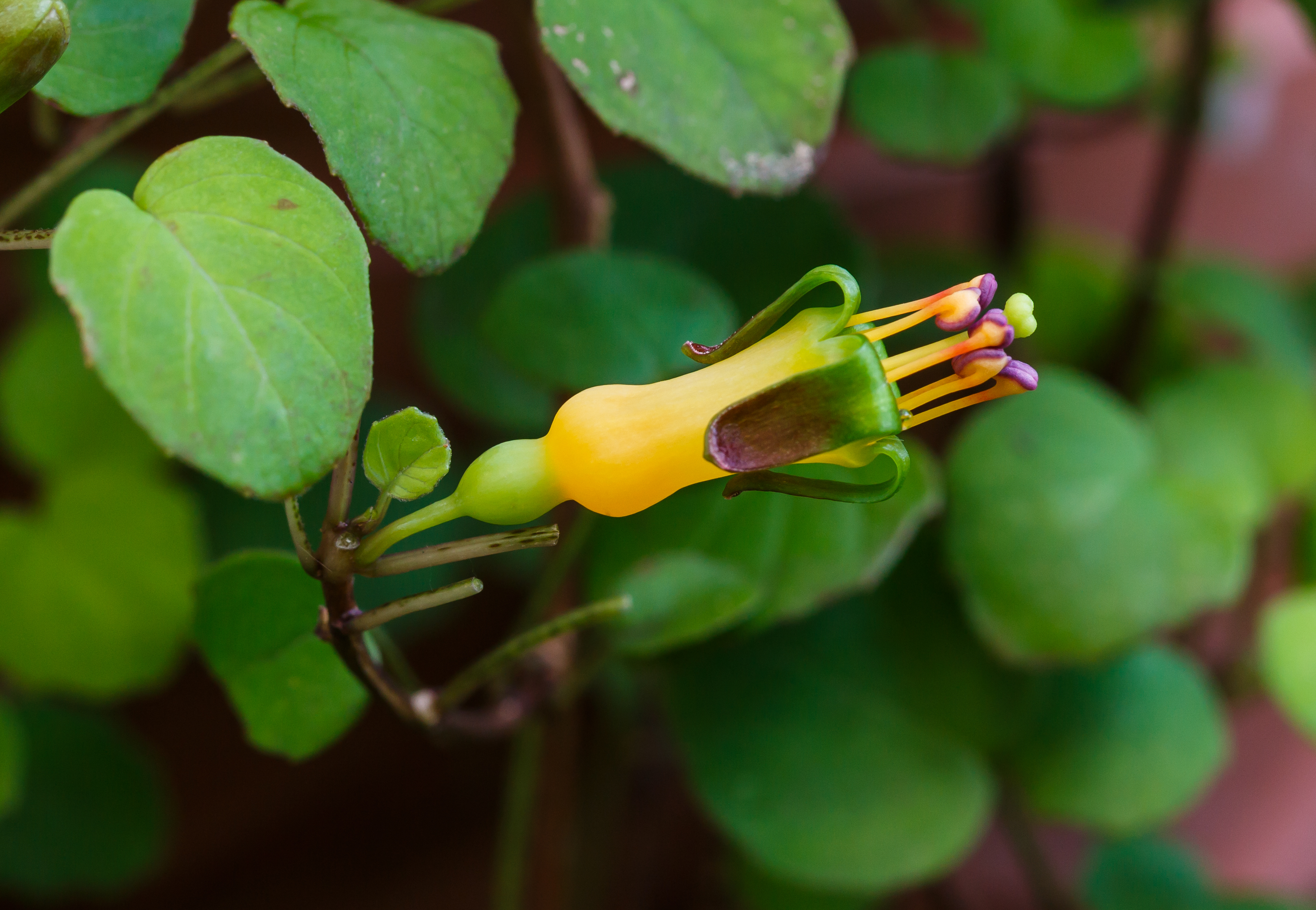

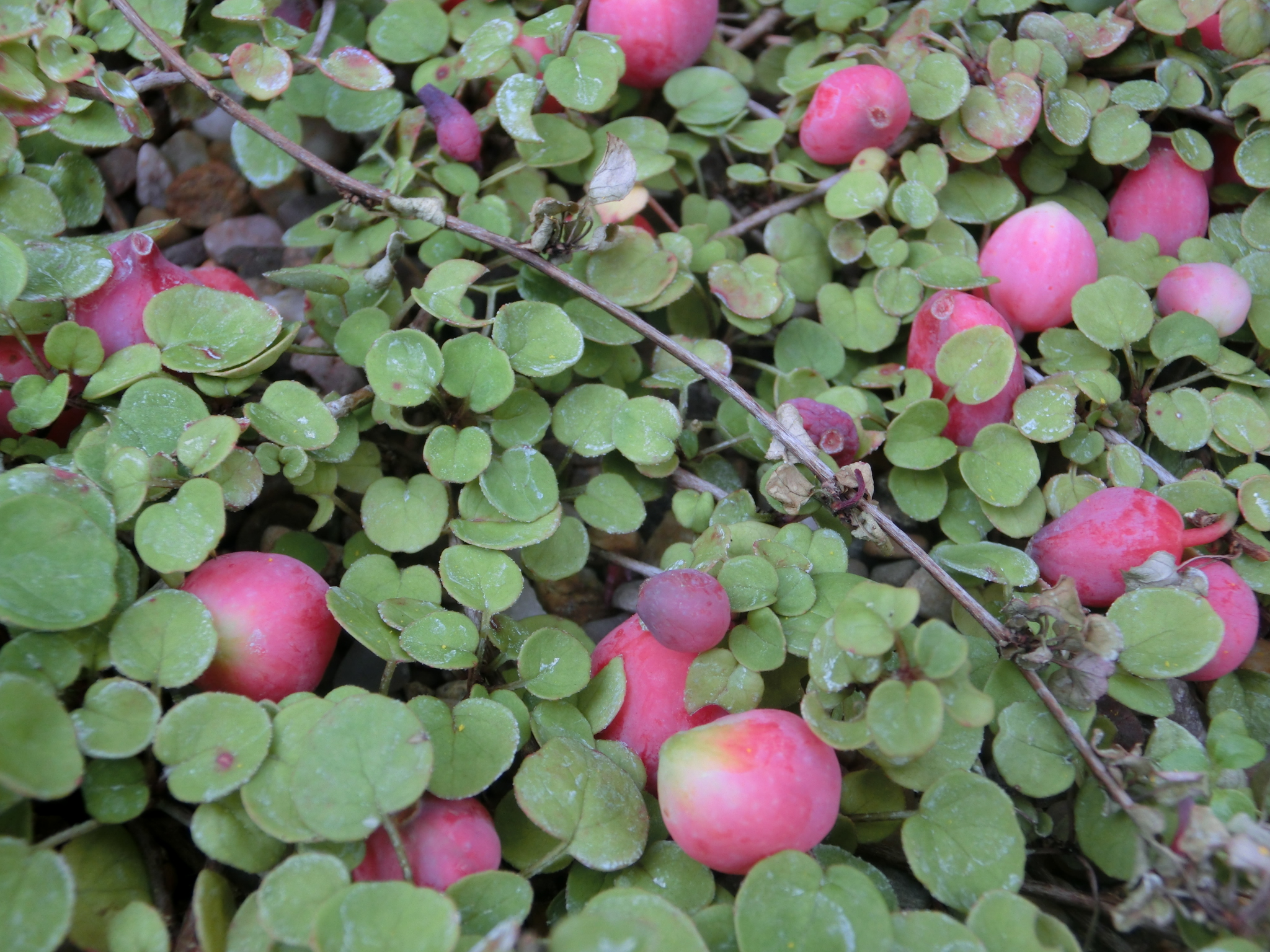

Scientific classification
- Kingdom: Plantae
- Clade: Tracheophytes
- Clade: Angiosperms
- Clade: Eudicots
- Clade: Rosids
- Order: Myrtales
- Family: Onagraceae
- Genus: Fuchsia
- Species: F. procumbens

Binomial name
- Fuchsia procumbens R.Cunn.
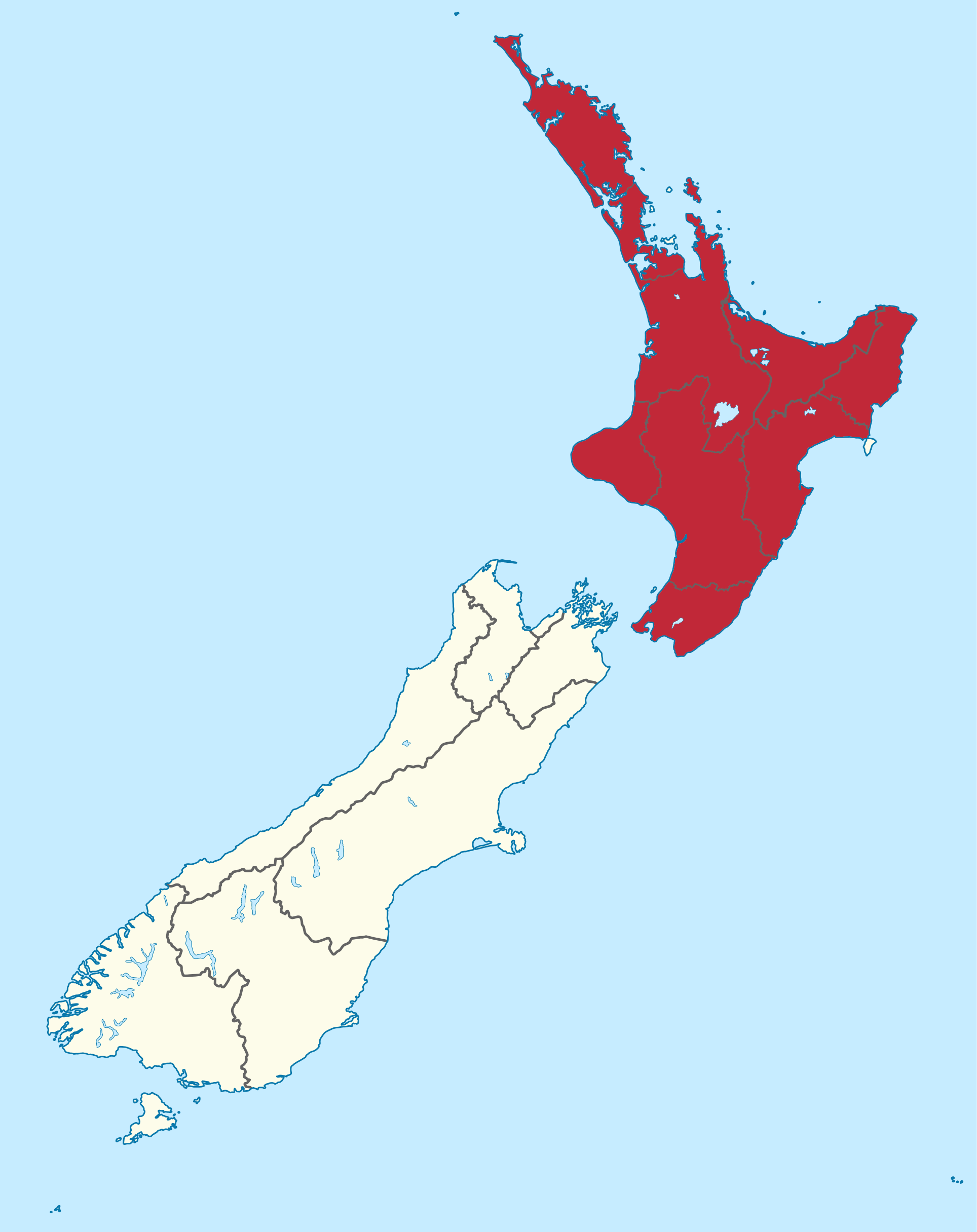
- It is endemic to the North island of New Zealand

Synonyms
- Fuchsia kirkii Hook. f.; Fuchsia prostrata Baill.

= Fuchsia procumbens =

Fuchsia procumbens Temporal range: 18 –0 Ma Early Miocene – Recent

Species of flowering plant in New Zealand

Fuchsia procumbens is a prostrate shrub that is endemic to coastal areas of the North Island of New Zealand. Common names include creeping fuchsia, climbing fuchsia or trailing fuchsia.

== Description ==
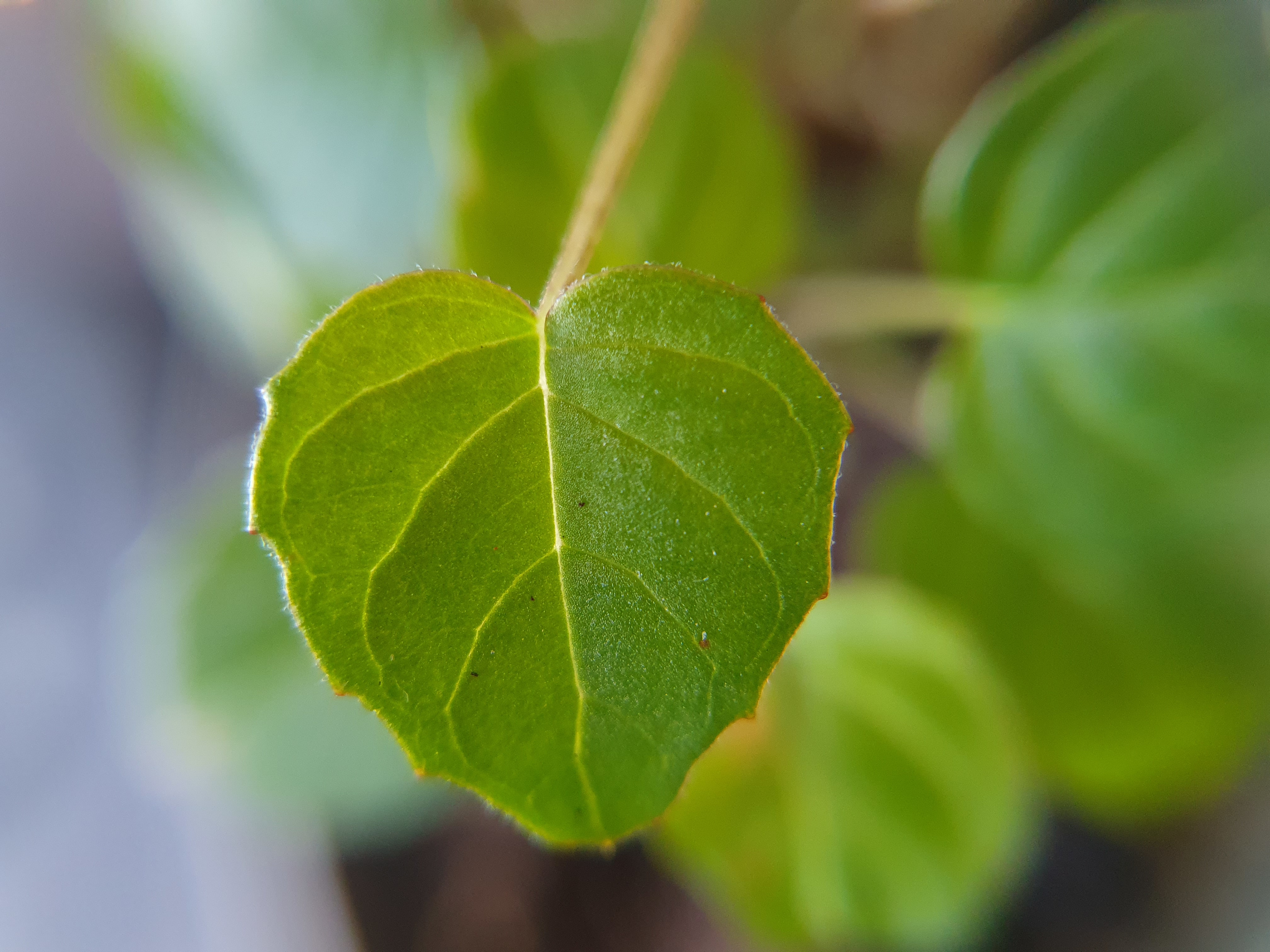
Fuchsia procumbens R.Cunn. leaf detail

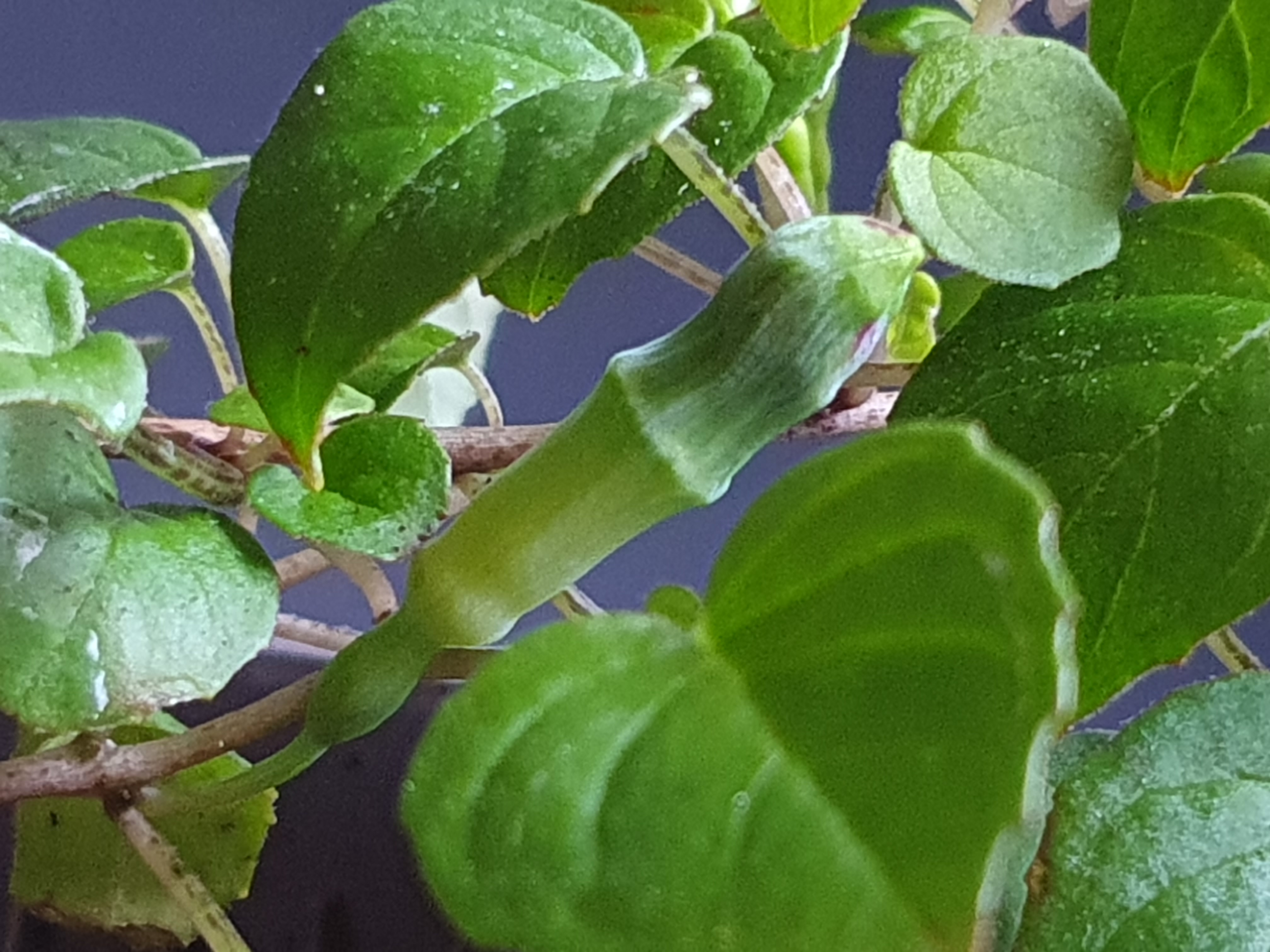
Fuchsia procumbens R.Cunn. flower bud

=== Vegetative characteristics ===
Its stems are slender, creeping, and weakly woody. They can climb heights of close to 1 m on small shrubs. The circular, 7–12 mm big leaves, which are attached singly to the stem, have dentate leaf margins, as well as trichomes on the surface.

=== Generative characteristics ===
The erect, radially symmetrical flowers with a yellow floral tube do not have any petals. Instead, it has four sepals, which display orange and green coloration. This contrasts with the blue pollen, which is a distinctive character of the Pacific Fuchsia clade. The pollen is produced in eight stamens.

=== Cytology ===
The diploid chromosome count is 2n = 22.

== Reproduction ==
Fuchsia procumbens is trioecious (i.e. subdioecious). Hermaphrodite, male, and female plants occur. Both male and female plants have two different types, which differ in the length of the style. Unisexual populations are thought to be able to persevere due to the vegetative reproduction by rooting along the creeping stems.

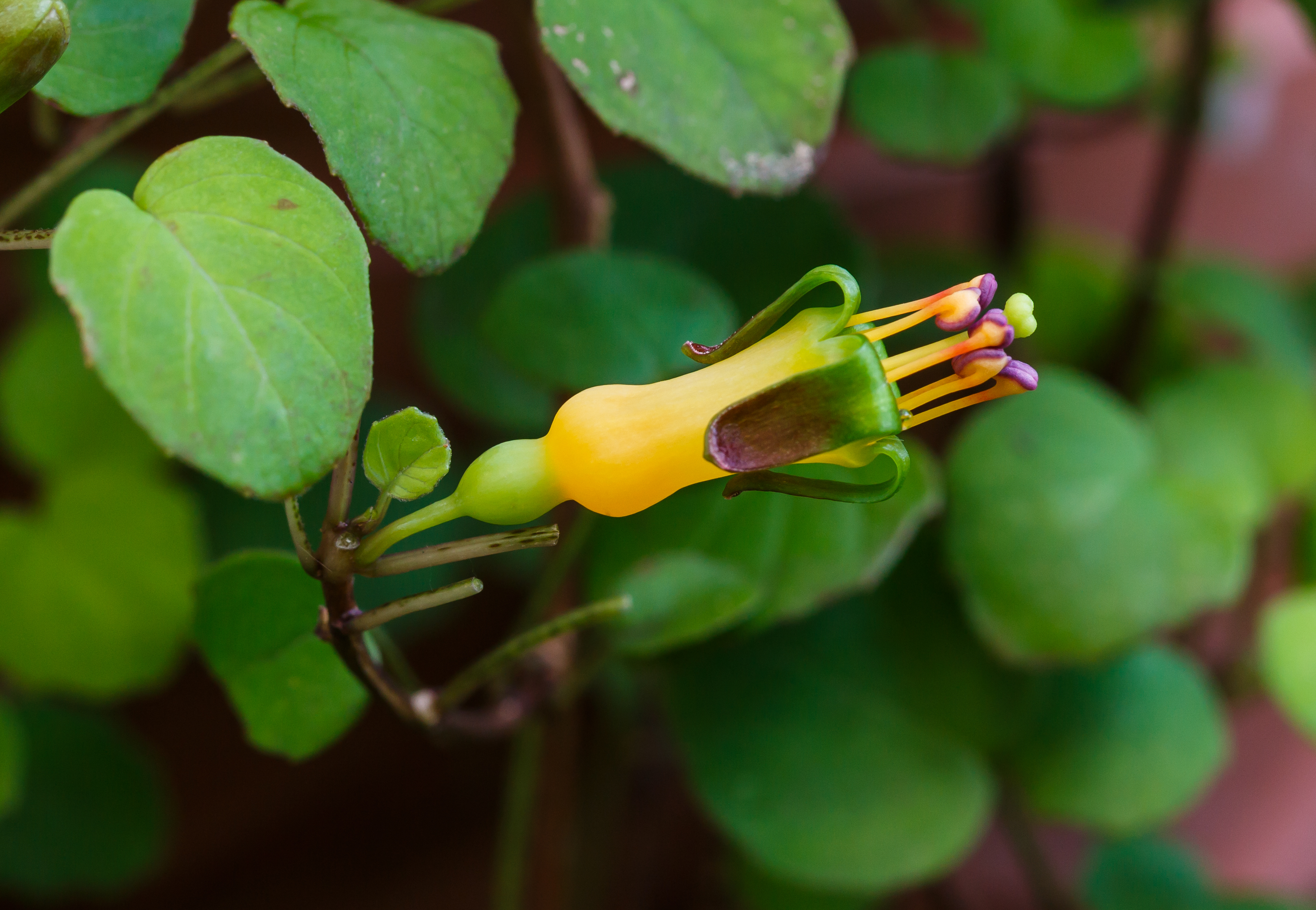
Hermaphrodite flowers have big globose stigmas about equal in size and position to the anthers

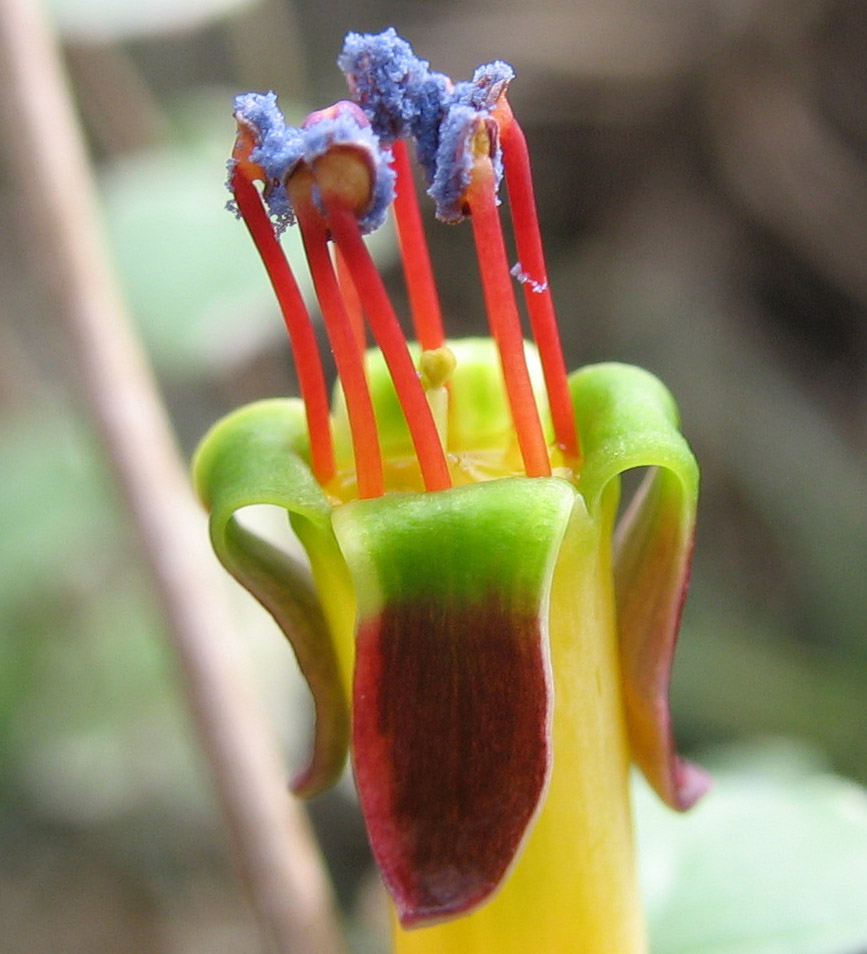
Male flowers have fully developed anthers but the stigma is thin and underdeveloped

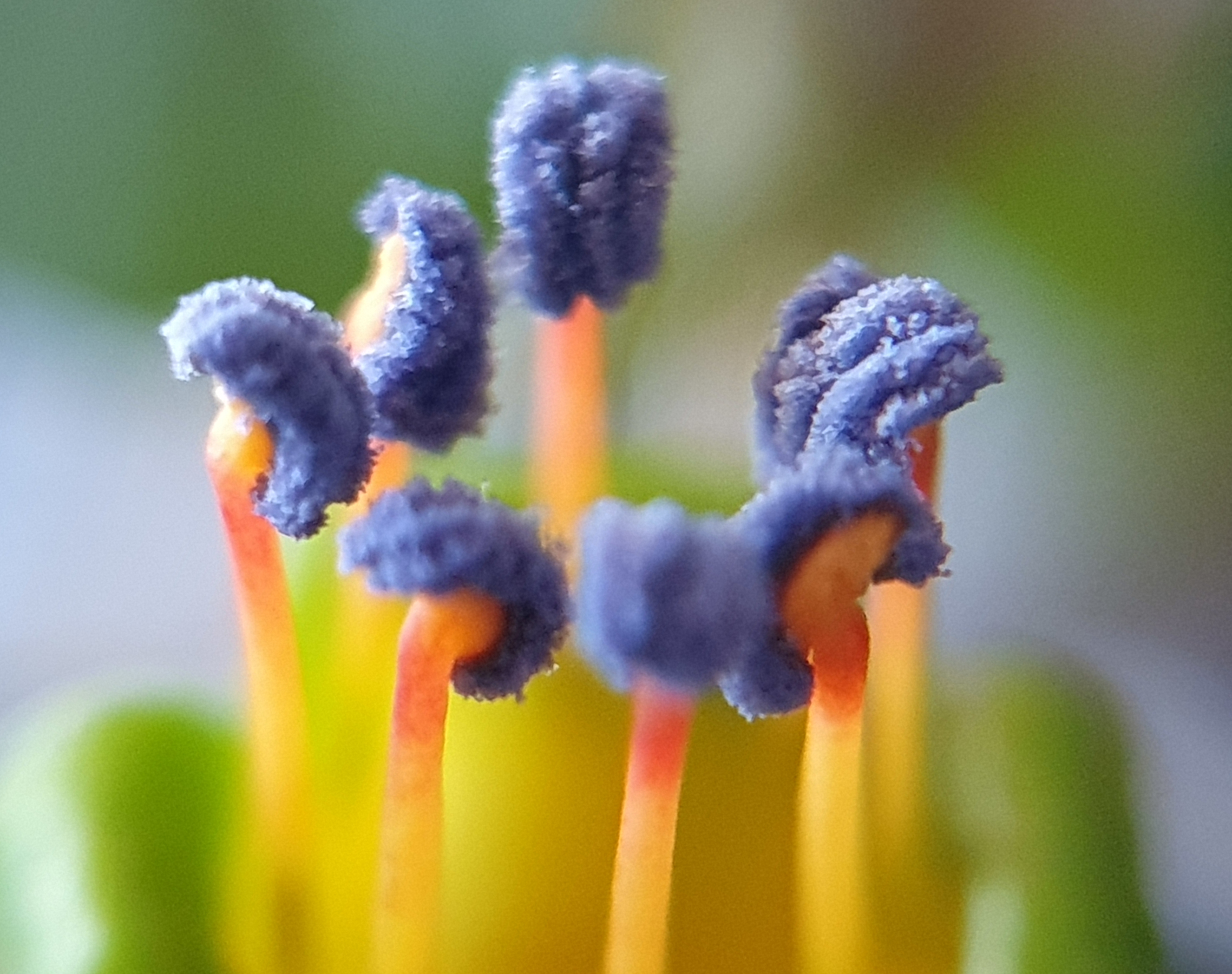
Detail of Fuchsia procumbens R.Cunn. stamina of male plant with remarkable blue pollen

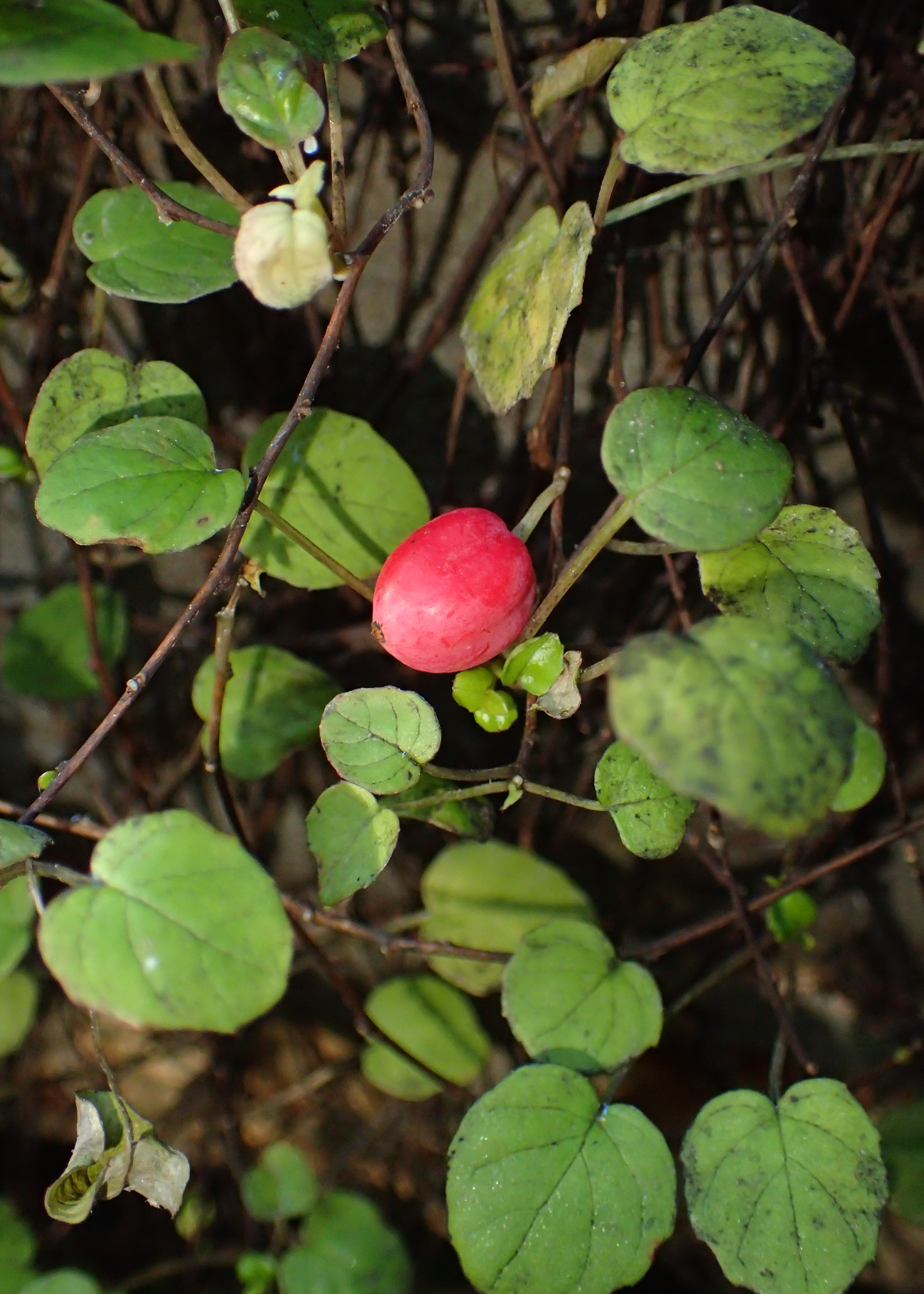
Mature fruit

== Taxonomy ==
It was published by Richard Cunningham in 1839. In the year 1995, Fuchsia procumbens was placed in the monotypic section Fuchsia sect. Procumbentes due to significant differences from the remaining Pacific Fuchsia clade.

=== Synonym status of Fuchsia kirkii ===
The species Fuchsia kirkii was described by Joseph Hooker in 1871 based on the male form of Fuchsia procumbens. Thereafter he recognized sexual dimorphism as the source of the perceived differences between the species.

=== Etymology ===
The specific epithet procumbens refers to the sprawling growth habit of the plant.

=== Phylogeny ===
It belongs to a South Pacific lineage that diverged from all other Fuchsia species around 30 million years ago. Fuchsia procumbens diverged from the other New Zealand (and Tahitian) species around 18 million years ago. The following relationships were reported:

- - Section Skinnera
    - - Fuchsia excorticata
      - Fuchsia × colensoi
    - Fuchsia cyrtandroides
  - Section Procumbentes
    Fuchsia procumbens

== Ecology ==
=== Pollination ===
Little is known about seed dispersal and pollination in Fuchsia procumbens. However, there have been speculations on pollination and seed dispersal through lizards, as well as reports on seed dispersal through invertebrates.

=== Habitat ===
Small populations occur in coastal areas of New Zealand's northern island. It grows in sand in proximity to the tide lines.

== Conservation ==
It has been categorized as "At risk – naturally uncommon" by the Threatened and uncommon plants of New Zealand list of 2009.

== Uses ==
=== Fruit ===
The small, red, crunchy fruit is edible, although rarely eaten. It has been described as slimy and bland.

=== Horticulture ===
It is commonly cultivated in gardens.
