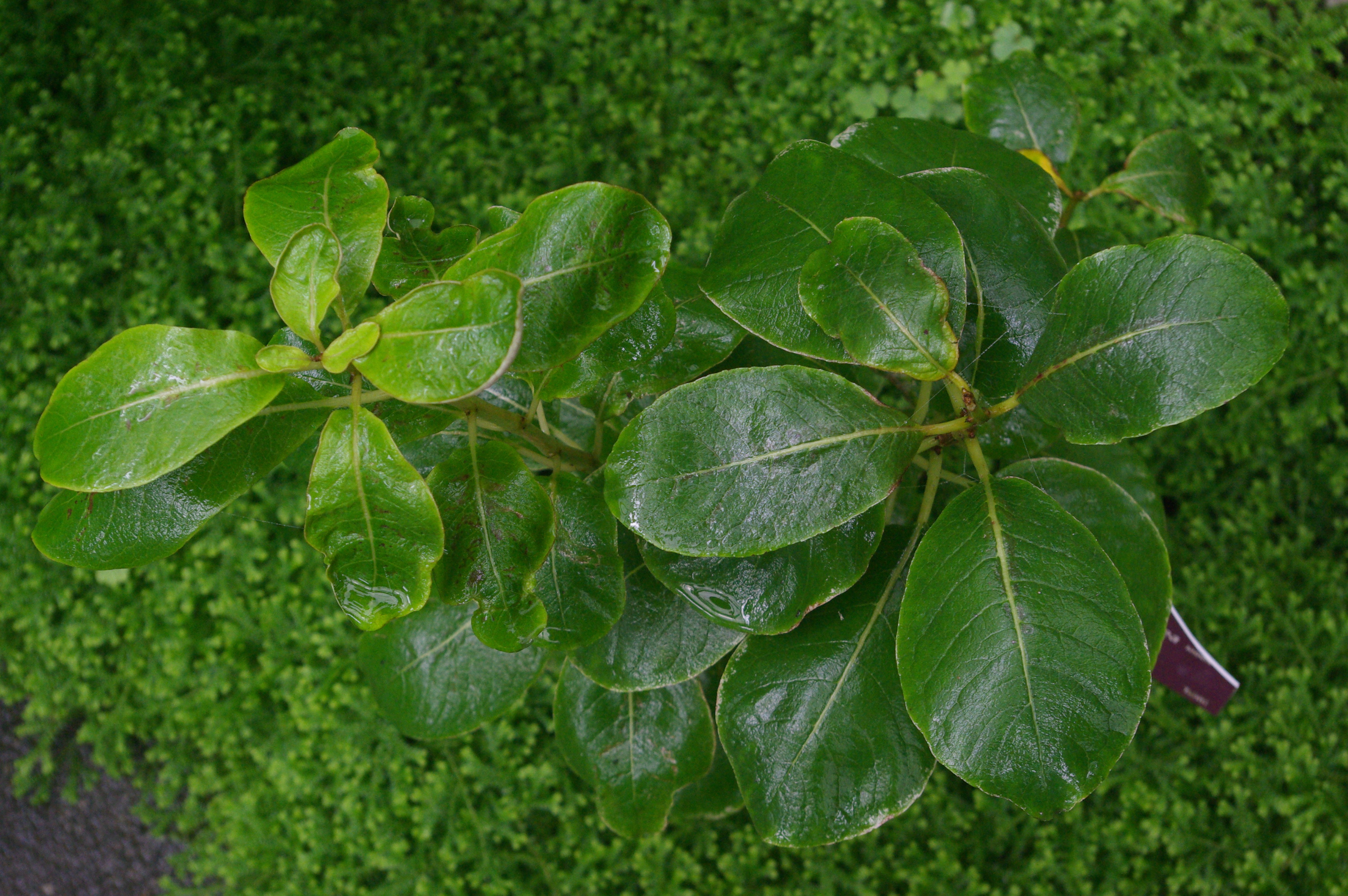
- Foliage

Conservation status
- Vulnerable (IUCN 3.1)

Scientific classification
- Kingdom: Plantae
- Clade: Tracheophytes
- Clade: Angiosperms
- Clade: Eudicots
- Clade: Rosids
- Order: Myrtales
- Family: Onagraceae
- Genus: Fuchsia
- Species: F. cyrtandroides

Binomial name
- Fuchsia cyrtandroides J.W.Moore

= Fuchsia cyrtandroides =

Species of flowering plant

Fuchsia cyrtandroides is a species of tree in the family Onagraceae. It reaches 7 metres (23 feet) in height. It is endemic to the island of Tahiti in French Polynesia, where it is found at the highest elevations of the western side of the island. It was first described by John William Moore in 1940. The conservation status of F. cytandroides in the IUCN Red List was assessed in 2015 as "Vulnerable", and its population trend was evaluated as "Decreasing".

== Description ==
Fuchsia cyrtandroides is a species of small tree in the family Onagraceae. The species reaches 7 metres (23 feet) in height with a trunk reaching 5–30 cm (2.0–11.8 in) in diameter. Its bark is tan-copper coloured, and somewhat fissured. The leaves are usually 4–12 cm (1.6–4.7 in) long and 2–6 cm (0.79–2.36 in) wide. They are rounded or obtuse in character. Flowers are light purple in colour. Fruits are purple-black in colour when ripe. The seeds are a tan colour. F. cyrtandroides has a gametic chromosome count of 11.

== Taxonomy ==
- - - - F. × colensoi
      - F. excorticata
    - F. cyrtandroides
  - F. procumbens

Cladogram depicting the phylogeny of selected species within the genus Fuchsia's Skinneria and Procumbentes sections

Fuchsia cytrandroides was first described by John William Moore in 1940. The Fuchsia genus consists of almost one-hundred ten species, mostly found in South and Central America. Godley & Berry (1995) conducted a revision of the Fuchsia genus in the South Pacific. They produced a cladogram using genetic data from the internal transcribed spacer (ITS) gene and two ribosomal genes. They placed three species and the variable hybrid F. × colensoi, in the section Skinnera. F. excorticata was placed in section Skinnera. However, F. procumbens was placed in a new section, Procumbentes. Berry et al. (2004) used cladistics to produce a phylogenetic tree of the genus Fuchsia, as such, F. cyrtandroides's placement can be summarised in the represented cladogram. The South Pacific Fuchsia lineage diverged approximately thirty million years ago, supported by fossil evidence from Australia and New Zealand.

=== Etymology ===
F. cyrtandroides's genus name, Fuchsia (/ˈfjuːʃə/ FEW-shə), is named in honour of the German physician and botanist Leonhart Fuchs. The specific epithet (second part of the scientific name), cyrtandroides, comes from the unrelated genus Cyrtanda.

== Distribution ==
Fuchsia cytandroides is endemic to the island of Tahiti of French Polynesia. In Tahiti, the species is found at the highest elevations of the western side of the island. The conservation status of F. cytandroides in the IUCN Red List was assessed in 2015 as "Vulnerable", and its population trend was evaluated as "Decreasing".

=== Habitat ===
Fuchsia cytandroides occurs from 1,150–2,000 m (3,770–6,560 ft) above sea level, and is common in shady valleys.

== Ecology ==
Fuchsia cyrtandroides is able to self-seed.

== Works cited ==
Books

- Vennell, Robert (2019). The Meaning of Trees. Auckland, New Zealand: HarperCollins. ISBN 978-1-77554-130-1.

Journals

- Berry, Paul E.; Hahn, William J.; Sytsma, Kenneth J.; Hall, Jocelyn C.; Mast, Austin (2004). "Phylogenetic Relationships and Biogeography of Fuchsia (Onagraceae) based on Noncoding Nuclear and Chloroplast DNA Data". American Journal of Botany. 91 (4): 601–614. doi:10.3732/ajb.91.4.601. ISSN 0002-9122.
- Godley, Eric J.; Berry, Paul E. (1995). "The Biology and Systematics of Fuchsia in the South Pacific". Annals of the Missouri Botanical Garden. 82 (4): 473. doi:10.2307/2399832.

Websites

- "Fuchsia cyrtandroides J.W.Moore, Occas. Pap. Bernice Pauahi Bishop Mus. xvi. 13 (1940)". International Plant Names Index. Archived from the original on 3 June 2025.
- Butaud, J.-F.; Jacq, F.; Meyer, J.-Y.; Taputuarai, R. (2023). "Fuchsia cyrtandroides". IUCN Red List of Threatened Species (in French). 2023 e.T236696332A236696334. doi:10.2305/IUCN.UK.2023-1.RLTS.T236696332A236696334.fr.
