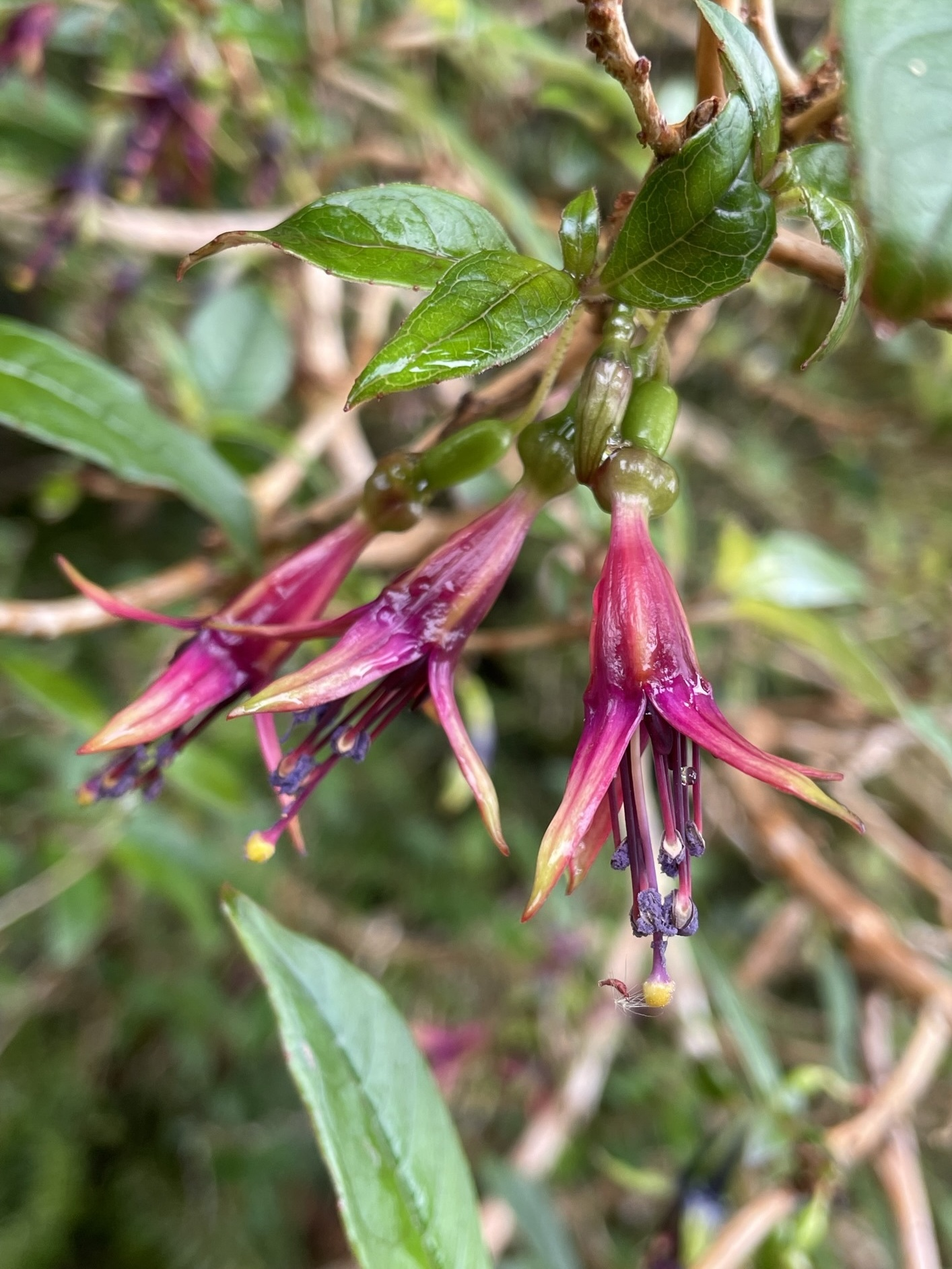
- Foliage and flowers of F. excorticata

Conservation status
- Not Threatened (NZ TCS)

Scientific classification
- Kingdom: Plantae
- Clade: Tracheophytes
- Clade: Angiosperms
- Clade: Eudicots
- Clade: Rosids
- Order: Myrtales
- Family: Onagraceae
- Genus: Fuchsia
- Species: F. excorticata

Binomial name
- Fuchsia excorticata (Forst. & Forst. f.) L. f.

= Fuchsia excorticata =

Species of flowering plant

Fuchsia excorticata, commonly known as the kōtukutuku and tree fuchsia, is a species of tree in the family Onagraceae that is endemic to New Zealand. It is the largest Fuchsia species and is deciduous, an uncommon trait in New Zealand plants. It reaches 13 metres (40 feet) in height with a trunk up to 70 cm (28 in) in diameter. Its range mainly covers the North, South, and Stewart Islands, but can be found as far south as the Auckland Islands. It inhabits lowland to montane ecosystems, and is especially common near streams and forest margins. F. excorticata is noted for its bark, which naturally peels off into thin sheets of paper. Its scientific name, excorticata, reflects this distinctive property.

Fuchsia excorticata was first described by the German naturalists Johann Reinhold Forster and Georg Forster in 1775. F. excorticata is self-compatible, but its colourful flowers commonly attract bird pollinators. F. excorticata's fruits are dispersed by fruit-eating animals (frugivores), such as birds. F. excorticata is one of New Zealand's least flammable trees, which earned it the nickname "bucket-of-water" wood by early European settlers as it is very difficult to burn. F. excorticta is a culturally important tree to the indigenous Māori people; it had multiple uses, importantly, the berries were used as a source of food. They were also eaten by early European settlers in the form of jams and puddings. F. excorticata's 2023 assessment in the New Zealand Threat Classification System was "Not Threatened".

== Description ==
Fuchsia excorticata (kōtukutuku) is a gynodioecious and deciduous species of tree in the family Onagraceae, reaching up to 13 metres (40 feet) in height with a twisted trunk, which is up to 70 cm (30 in) in diameter. It branches within several metres from the base, forming a spreading canopy. (Note: The New Zealand natural history teacher Lloyd Esler claimed in 2025 that F. excorticata can reach 15 m in height with a trunk up to 80 cm in diameter, possibly referring to a specimen he saw at Forest Hill Scenic Reserve. However, a more comprehensive description of the species from 1995 claims that 13 m is height the limit.) F. excorticata is the largest member of the genus Fuchsia; while most species grow as shrubs or small trees, this species has evolved in New Zealand to reach a much greater height. F. excorticata is noted for its shredding bark, which is a copper, orange, to reddish-brown in colour, and naturally peels off into thin sheets of paper, revealing the smooth pale green cambial layer in the inner bark. The leaves are up to 10 cm (4 in) long and 1.5–3 cm (0.6–1 in) wide. They are glabrous and slightly strigose in character and acute to rounded in shape. They are medium to dark green on the upperside and silver or white on the underside of the leaves.

Fuchsia excorticata is one of few deciduous trees in New Zealand. This means they lose their leaves in colder months. Throughout most of its range in the South Island and in the mountainous areas of the North Island, F. excorticata loses its leaves in autumn and reproduces them in spring, although some populations in the North Island retain them. A population of completely deciduous trees have been recorded as far north as Auckland. A 1936 study conducted in Dunedin showed that leaf fall began in early May and lasted for three to four weeks. F. excorticata remains leafless until new shoots appear in August or September.

Flowering occurs mostly from August to December; flowers grow individually, but the tree can sometimes exhibit cauliflory, where they grow directly from stems or the main trunk. The ovaries are 4.5–8 mm long, 1.7–3 mm thick and green in colour. The sepals are narrow-triangular in character, 8 mm long, 3 mm wide at the base, and lustrous green in colour with purple streaks at the upper parts between the ridges, then changing to a red or crimson colour in the middle.

The petals are dark purple in colour and 1.8–5 mm long, 0.7–2.1 mm wide in the middle. The filaments are a purple to pale cream colour, 6–15 mm and 5–10 mm long, pollen-collecting anthers are also purple, 1.8–2.5 mm long and 1–1.7 mm thick. The styles are green to yellow in colour and 22–40 mm long. The stigmas are yellow to green in colour, 1.8–2.2 mm long and 1.4–2.1 mm wide. The colourful blue pollen results from anthocyanins and pigments, specifically kaempferol-3-sophoroside and quercetin-3-sophoroside. Fruits are a black to dark purple colour, 9–13 mm long and 5–8 mm thick. The seeds are a tan colour, 0.75–1 mm long and 0.3–0.6 mm broad, each fruit consists of about 320–670 seeds. F. excorticata has a gametic chromosome count of 11.

== Gallery ==
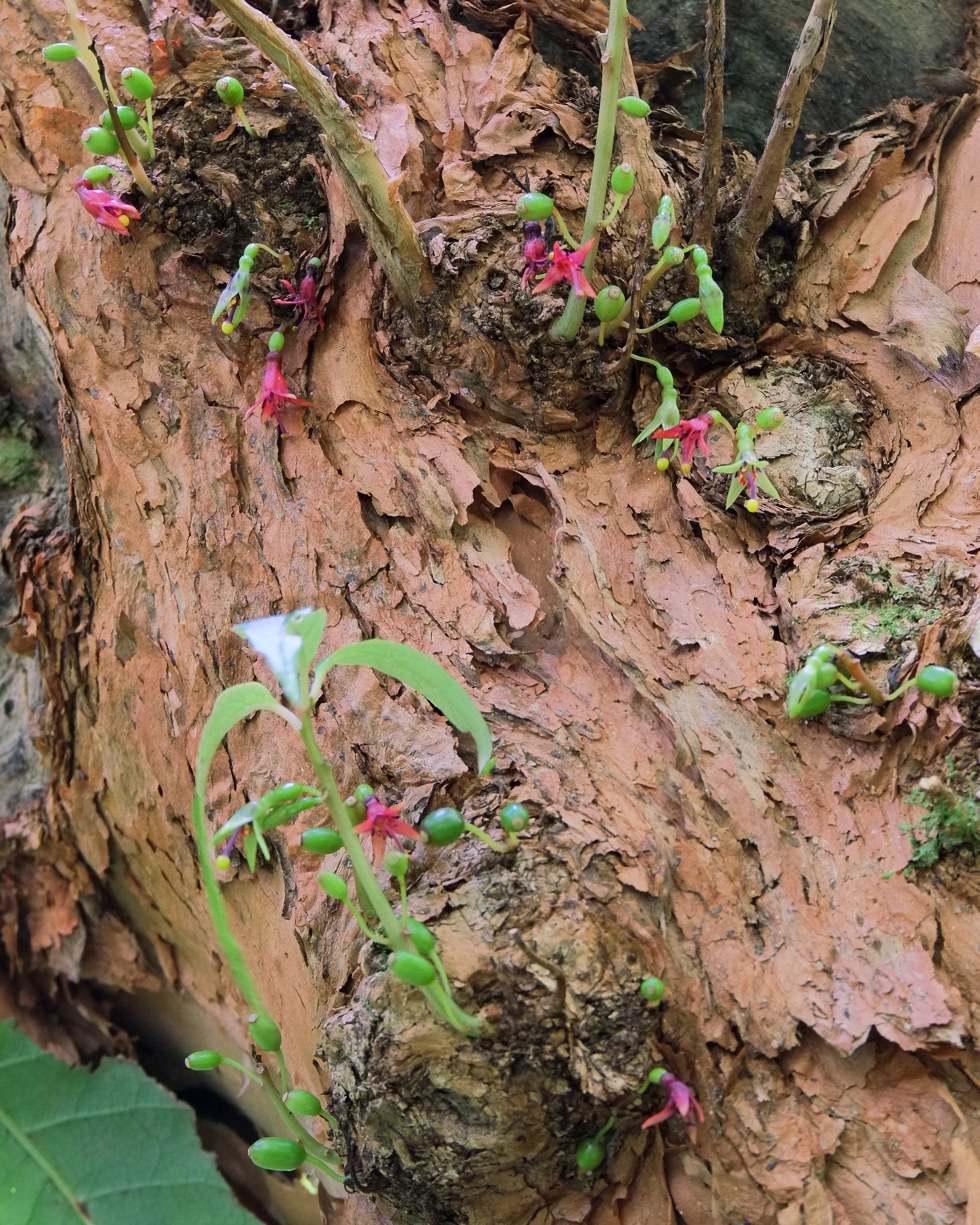
F. excorticata exhibiting cauliflory

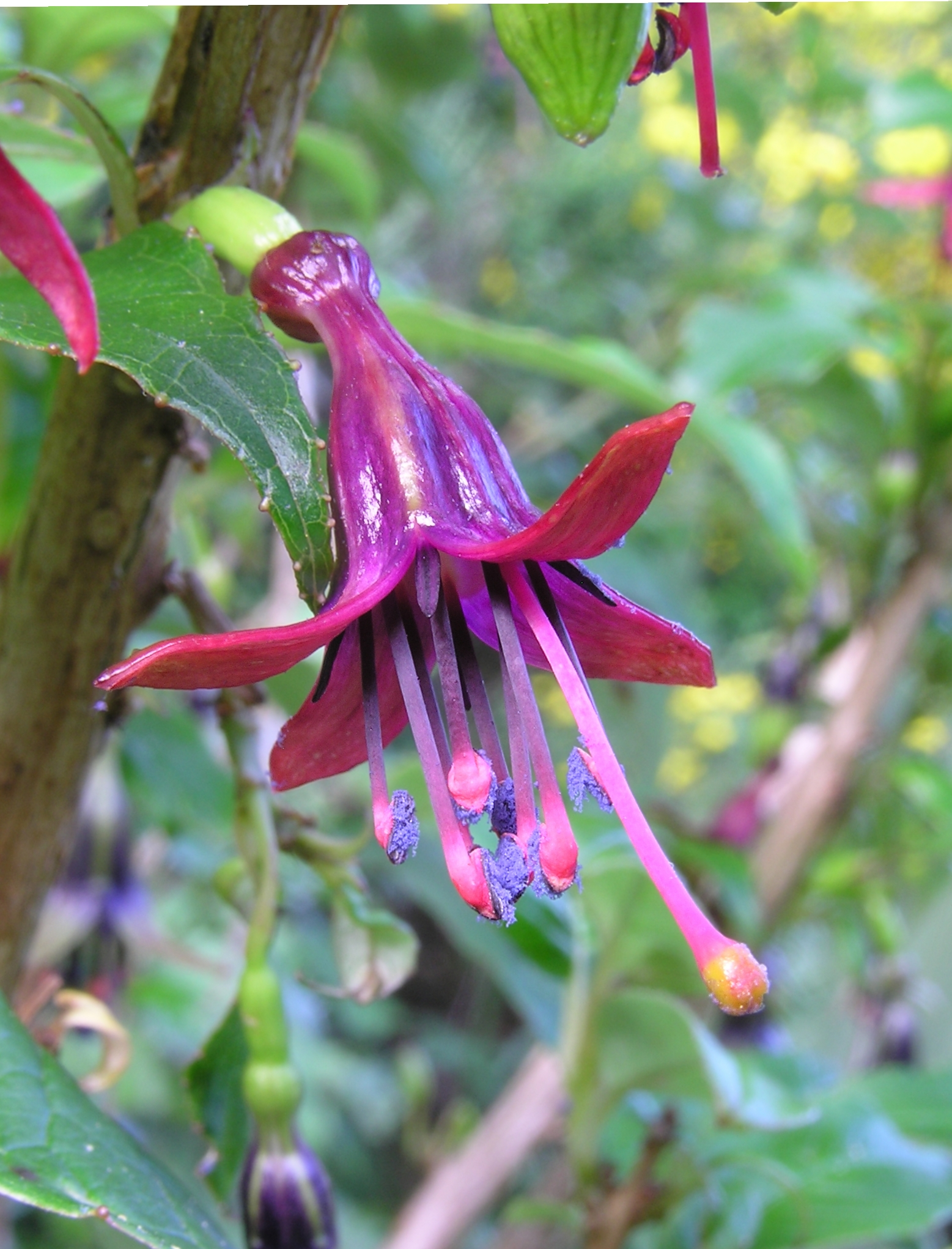
The colourful flowers produce blue pollen.

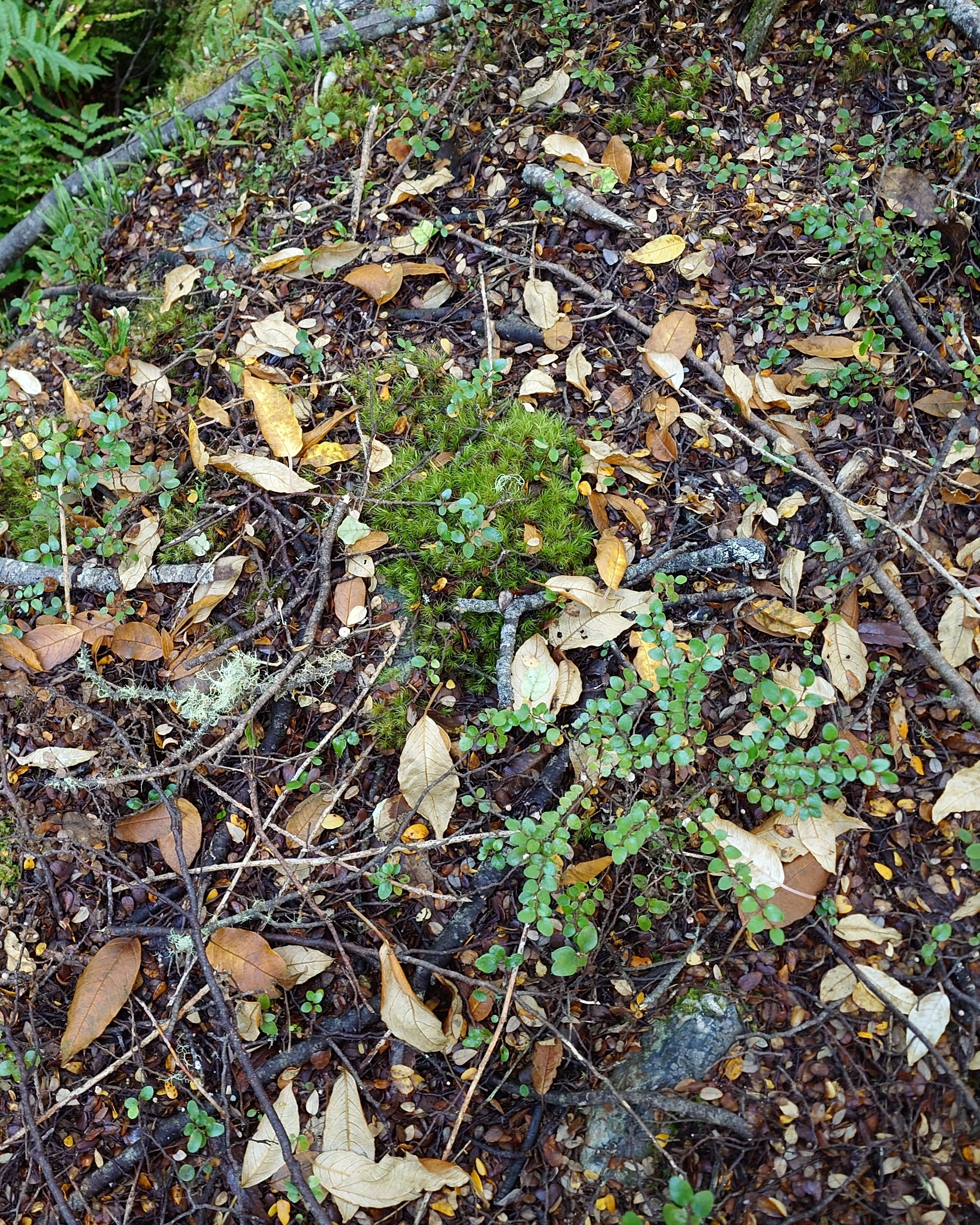
F. excorticata's leaf litter on the forest floor

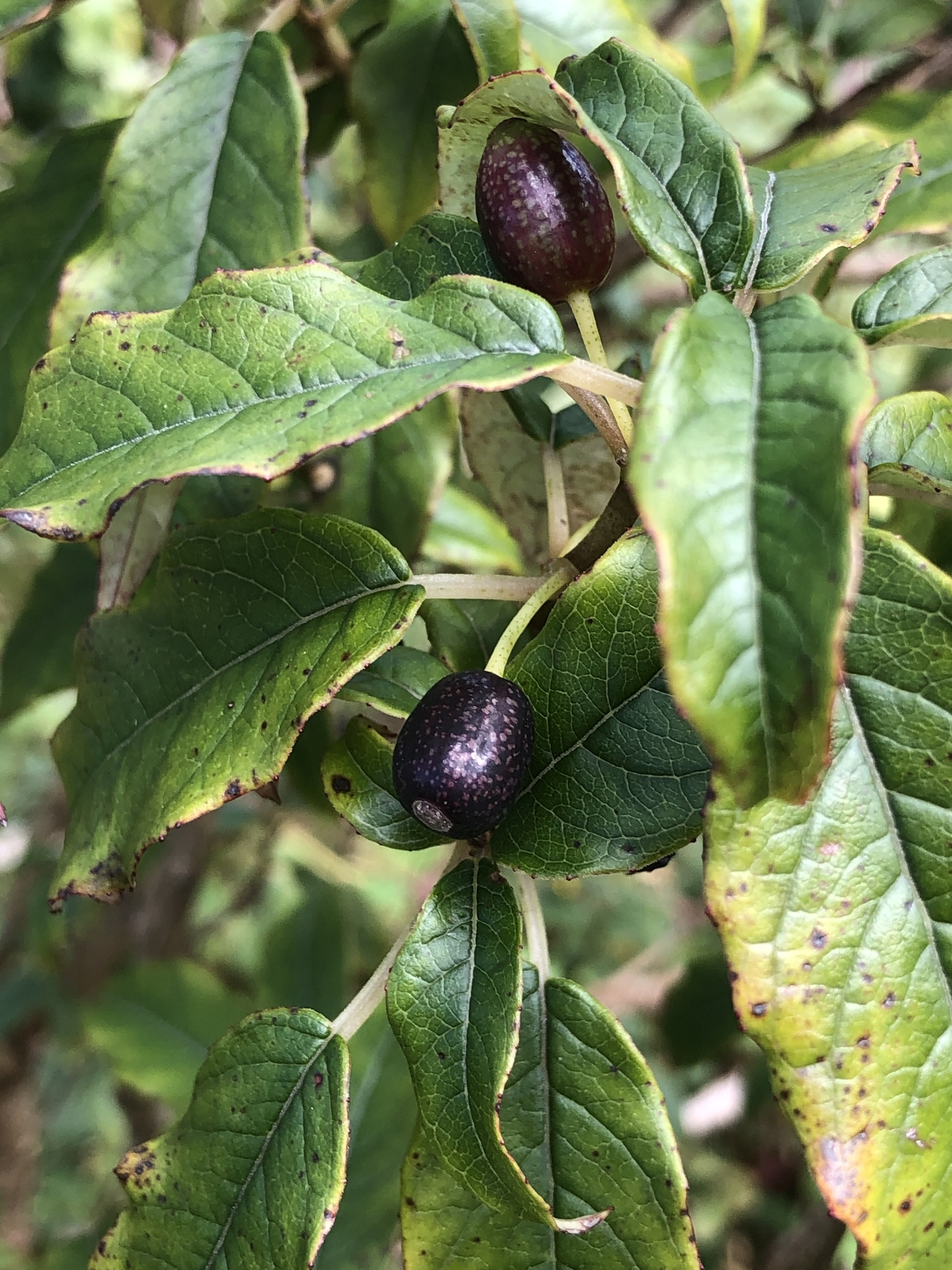
The edible fruits are purple to black in colour.

== Taxonomy ==
=== Classification ===
- - - - F. × colensoi
      - F. excorticata
    - F. cyrtandroides
  - F. procumbens

Cladogram depicting the phylogeny of selected species within the genus Fuchsia's Skinneria and Procumbentes sections

Fuchsia excorticata is one of three Fuchsia species that are native to New Zealand. (Note: Excluding F. × colensoi, a naturally occurring hybrid of F. excorticata and F. perscandens.) The Fuchsia genus consists of almost one-hundred ten species, mostly found in South and Central America. Godley & Berry (1995) conducted a revision of the Fuchsia genus in the South Pacific. They produced a cladogram using genetic data from the internal transcribed spacer (ITS) gene and two ribosomal genes. They placed three species and the variable hybrid F. × colensoi, (Note: F. excorticata can hybridise with F. perscandens, resulting in the hybrid Fuchsia × colensoi, but can only naturally hybridise within the range of F. perscandens.) in the section Skinnera. F. excorticata was placed in section Skinnera. However, F. procumbens was placed in a new section, Procumbentes. Berry et al. (2004) used cladistics to produce a phylogenetic tree of the genus Fuchsia, as such, F. excorticata's placement can be summarised in the represented cladogram. The South Pacific Fuchsia lineage diverged approximately thirty million years ago, supported by fossil evidence from Australia and New Zealand.

=== History ===
Fuchsia excorticata was first collected in October 1769 by European botanists Joseph Banks and Daniel Solander, on the first voyage of James Cook. It was collected in Anaura Bay near Gisborne. A specimen was also collected in the South Island's Queen Charlotte Sound / Tōtaranui. These localities were recorded in their notes titled "Primitiae Florae Novae Zelandiae" (Beginnings of a Flora of New Zealand). The species, F. excorticata, was first described by the German naturalists Johann Reinhold Forster and Georg Forster in 1775, first recorded the species under the name Skinnera excorticata. In 1782, Carl Linnaeus the Younger placed the plant in the genus Fuchsia, which remains the species accepted scientific name and taxonomic placement.

=== Etymology ===
The etymology of F. excorticata's genus name, Fuchsia (/ˈfjuːʃə/ FEW-shə), is named in honour of the German physician and botanist Leonhart Fuchs. The specific epithet (second part of the scientific name), excorticata, means 'loose-barked', and reflects the distinctive peeling property of the tree's bark. The former generic name, Skinnera, was named after the botanist Richard Skinner. The species is commonly known as kōtukutuku, native fuchsia, and tree fuchsia. The Māori language name, kōtukutuku, likewise refers to the species' peeling bark. The same name can also be applied to female tōtara (Podocarpus totara) and kaikawaka (Libocedrus bidwillii), both of which share the same distinctive properties. Some other Māori names for the plant can include: kōhutuhutu, kōhutuku, and kōnini. The fruits are known as kōnini, tākawa, hōnā, and māti.

== Ecology ==
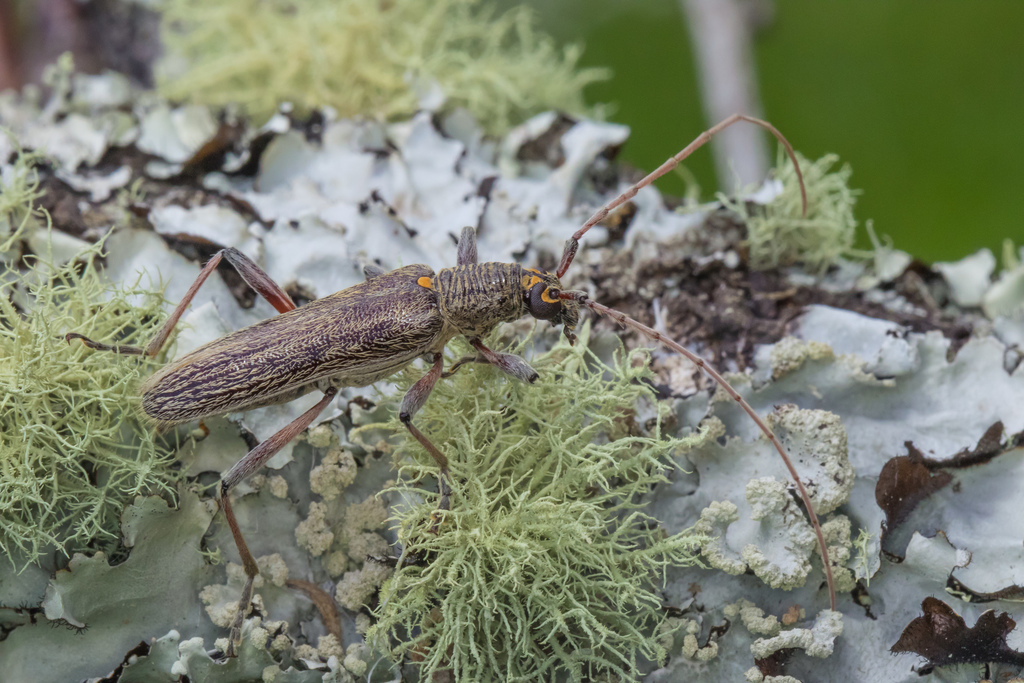
F. excorticata plays host to the endemic lemon tree borer.

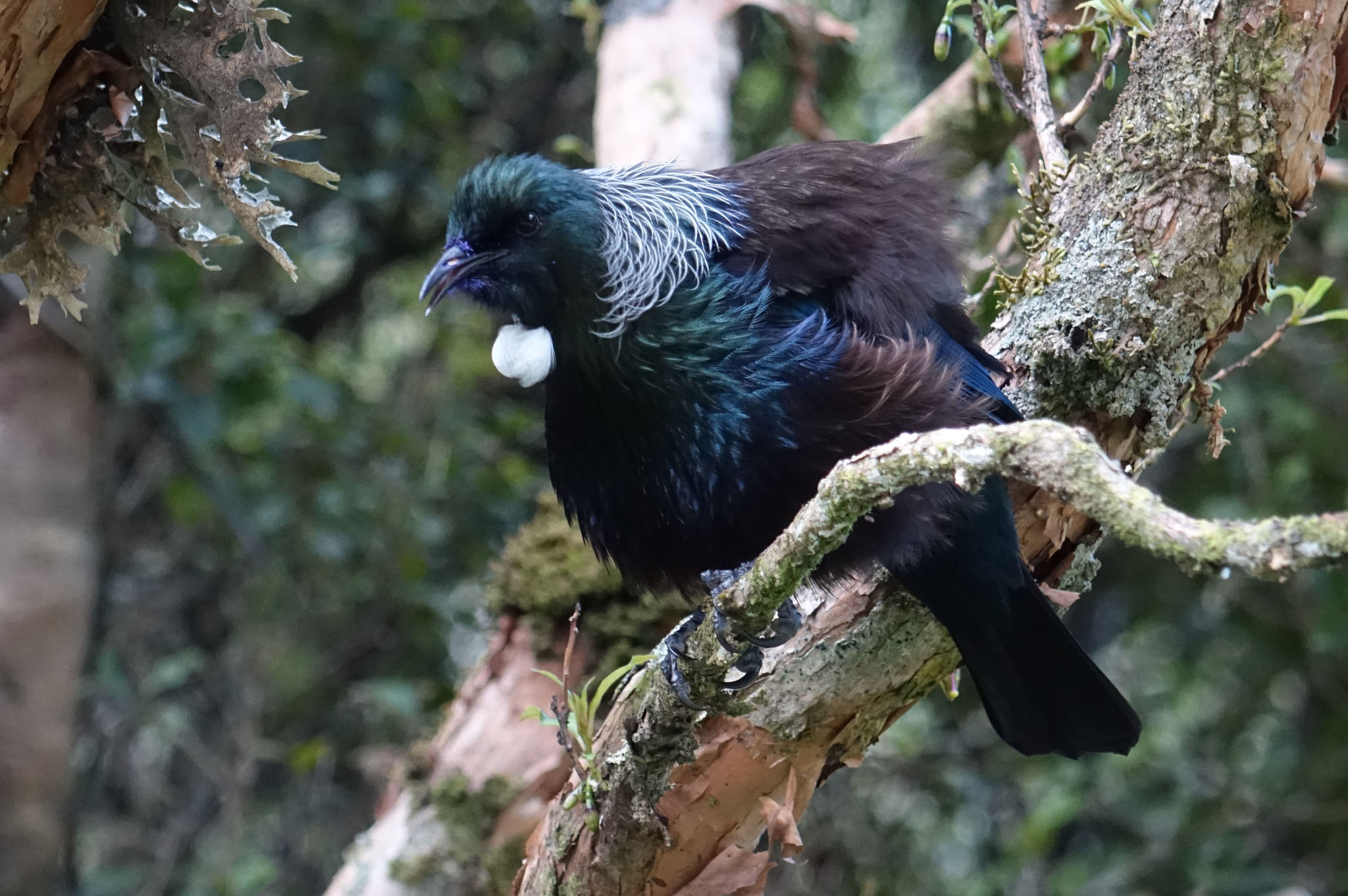
A tūī visiting a F. excorticata specimen

Fuchsia excorticata's fruits are dispersed by fruit-eating animals (frugivores). F. excorticata's fruits are an important food source for numerous New Zealand native birds, and they are an especially important food source for the kererū (Hemiphaga novaeseelandiae). Other birds, such as the tūī (Prosthemadera novaeseelandiae) and the New Zealand bellbird (Anthornis melanura) consume the fruits frequently. Beveridge (1964) estimated that a single dropping from an introduced blackbird (Turdus merula) produced 178 seedlings, thus proving the efficiency of blackbirds as seed distributors. The fruits of F. excorticata can also be part of the diet of the flightless kākāpō (Strigops habroptilus). German-born New Zealand explorer Julius von Haast said that he saw a kākāpō "sitting on a Fuchsia-tree, 10 feet from the ground, and eating berries".

Fuchsia excorticata has a gynodioecious breeding strategy, meaning individual trees are either hermaphroditic or female. According to Robertson et al. (2008), hermaphroditic individuals occur at a higher frequency than females. F. excorticata can be pollinated by birds, primarily by bellbirds and tūī. Other birds, such as stitchbirds (Pogonornis cincta) and silvereyes (Zosterops lateralis), as well as bumblebees (Bombus spp.) have been reported as visitors on F. excorticata flowers. Evidence presented by a 2012 study shows that the upland moa (Megalapteryx didinus) fed on the nectar. Green flowers stand out compared to the orange bark and produce more nectar, thus making them more attractive and rewarding to bird pollinators than red flowers. New Zealand botanist Eric Godley suggested that F. excorticata is capable of self-pollination "in the absence of pollinator visitors".

The introduction of the common brushtail possum to New Zealand has led to a decline in this species. F. excorticata appears to be one of the possum's preferred food sources, and they will browse individual trees to the point of defoliation after which the trees can die. F. excorticata plays host to the endemic insect, the lemon tree borer (Oemona hirta). Wyman et al. (2011) investigated interactions between tree wētā (Hemideina spp.) and F. excorticata, finding that tree wētā consumes its seeds. F. excorticata has very low flammability rates. A 2025 study in the American Journal of Botany found that F. excorticata had a moderate ignition percentage, burn time, and burned amount of biomass.

== Distribution ==
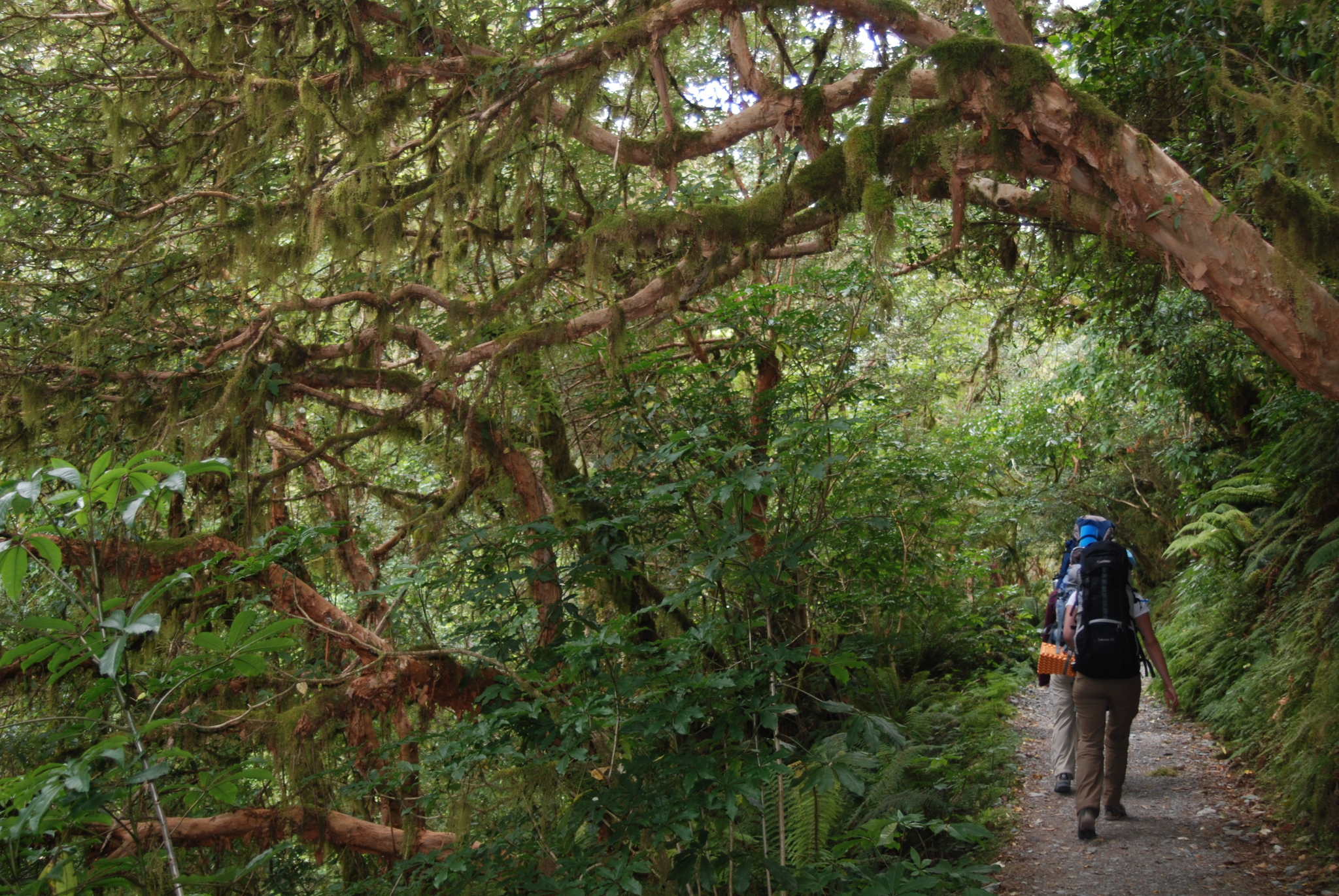
A mature F. excorticata specimen overhanging the Key Summit Track in Fiordland, South Island

Fuchsia excorticata is endemic to New Zealand. It is the most widely distributed Fuchsia species in the South Pacific. Its range mainly covers the North and South Islands, but can be found as far south as the Auckland Islands; where it has only been recorded in one locality in Laurie Harbour at Port Ross. In 1980, the New Zealand ecologist Colin Meurk, on an expedition to the Auckland Islands, said that he saw F. excorticata "scattered along a small tributary" at about 75 m (200 ft) in elevation on the south side of Grey Duck Creek 200 m (700 ft) away from the mouth of Laurie Harbour.

Fuchsia excorticata is uncommon on Stewart Island, with its population being reduced by browsing mammals; the species was likely never a dominant tree species there due to low soil fertility. There is also a naturalised population on the Chatham Islands, but it was introduced there by humans. Godley & Berry (1995) noted that a person who visited the island in 1976 said that they were assured that "F. excorticata was introduced there about 90 years ago". F. excorticata's conservation status was assessed in 2023 in the New Zealand Threat Classification System as "Not Threatened". Its conservation status in the 2024 revision in the IUCN Red List was "Least Concern", and its population trend was evaluated as "Unknown".

=== Habitat ===
Fuchsia excorticata is typically found in lowland and montane ecosystems, and is commonly found along streams and forest margins. It has a wide altitudinal range of 0–1,050 m (0–3,445 ft) above sea level. It can establish itself in most soil conditions, but generally prefers to grow in riparian soils and can also be utilised as a predecessor species for areas where conditions and soils are not the best. The soil contents in river-bed forests, where F. excorticata commonly grows, can consist of a surface layer of humus overlaying a layer of river-shingle. F. excorticata prefers shaded areas but can still grow well in sunny areas. The species is commonly found in mixed hardwood and podocarp or southern beech (Nothofagus) forests, but it is also common in other disturbed forests.

Vegetation in these areas where F. excorticata grows in can vary; for example, in plant communities that grow especially near rivers, F. excorticata can be commonly associated with wineberry (Aristotelia serrata), māhoe (Melicytus ramiflorus), and koromiko (Veronica salicifolia). F. excorticata can also exhibit some colonial characteristics, especially after glacier retreat and deforestation.

== Uses ==
=== In Māori culture ===
I whea koe i te ngahorotanga o te rau o te kōtukutuku
Where wert thou in the falling of the leaves of the kōtukutuku?

In Māori culture, F. excorticata's blooming flowers in September are a traditional indicator sign of the lunar calendar in the North Island, as a sign to plant early spring crops such as kūmara (sweet potato). (Note: A Māori proverb (whakataukī) relating to this can be summarised in the represented quotation box.) The fruits, known as kōnini, are a valued traditional food source in Māori culture, and were often collected from the trees by men, either by climbing the tree or shaking the branches, so the fruits would fall down. The fruits were used to create a purple dye, and the blue pollen was traditionally used for cosmetics for young girls. The tree also has uses in traditional Māori medicinal practices, where the leaves are one ingredient used in baths to help with childbirth, bruises, and fevers.

=== In European culture ===
Fuchsia excorticata's fruits were also eaten by European settlers in the form of jams and puddings. F. excorticata was one of few native plants that European settlers consumed the fruits of. British missionary Richard Taylor described the fruits in 1870 as a "rather sweet taste, somewhat astringent" and another source from 1973 described them as "pleasant to the taste, and very full of flavour". European settlers also experimented with the bark as a substitute for tobacco, although this method was not considered effective.

The timber is very durable and was greatly valued by settlers. It has been primarily used for cabinetry items, such as: inkstands, inlaying, ornamental turnery, and picture-frames. It can also be used for bowls, house-blocks, fencing and other similar items. The timber has been described as "almost indestructible" and largely unaffected by fire and decay by the botanist Thomas Kirk. It was termed "bucket-of-water" wood by settlers as it is difficult to burn. In an 1885–1886 fire in the Taranaki Region, a lot of fencing was destroyed, the posts made from F. excorticata wood were singed, but not burned through.

== Works cited ==
Books

- Cockayne, Leonard (1921). The Vegetation of New Zealand. New York City, United States: G E Stechert & Co.
- Colenso, William (1879). Transactions and Proceedings of the New Zealand Institute. Vol. 12. New Zealand Institute.
- Kirk, Thomas (1889). The Forest Flora of New Zealand. Wellington, New Zealand: Government of New Zealand.
- Crowe, Andrew (2009). Which Native Tree? New Zealand Native Trees: A Simple Guide to their Identification, Ecology and Uses. Auckland, New Zealand: Penguin. ISBN 978-0-14-300899-6.
- Vennell, Robert (2019). The Meaning of Trees. Auckland, New Zealand: HarperCollins. ISBN 978-1-77554-130-1.
- Wardle, J. (2011). Wardle's Native Plants of New Zealand and Their Story. Bateson Publishing Limited. ISBN 9781877520068.

Journals

- Berry, Paul E.; Hahn, William J.; Sytsma, Kenneth J.; Hall, Jocelyn C.; Mast, Austin (2004). "Phylogenetic Relationships and Biogeography of Fuchsia (Onagraceae) based on Noncoding Nuclear and Chloroplast DNA Data". American Journal of Botany. 91 (4): 601–614. doi:10.3732/ajb.91.4.601. ISSN 0002-9122.
- Beveridge, A. E. (1964). "Animal Modification of Native Vegetation: Dispersal and Destruction of Seed in central North Island Podocarp Forests". Proceedings of the New Zealand Ecological Society. 11 (48–56). ISSN 0110-6465.
- Burrows, C. J. (1995). "Germination Behaviour of Seeds of the New Zealand Species Fuchsia excorticata, Griselinia littoralis, Macropiper excelsum, and Melicytus ramiflorus". New Zealand Journal of Botany. 33 (1): 131–140. doi:10.1080/0028825X.1995.10412950. ISSN 0028-825X.
- Delph, L. F.; Lively, C. M. (1985). "Pollinator Visits to Floral Colour Phases of Fuchsia excorticata". New Zealand Journal of Zoology. 12 (4): 599–603. doi:10.1080/03014223.1985.10428309. ISSN 0301-4223.
- Godley, Eric J.; Berry, Paul E. (1995). "The Biology and Systematics of Fuchsia in the South Pacific". Annals of the Missouri Botanical Garden. 82 (4): 473. doi:10.2307/2399832.
- Haast, Julius von (1864). "Notes on the Ground‐Parrot of New Zealand (Strigops habroptilus)". Ibis. 6 (3). Wiley: 340–346. doi:10.1111/j.1474-919x.1864.tb07874.x. ISSN 0019-1019.
- Lim, Ganges; Burns, K. C. (2024). "Conspicuous, Green Flowers are an Honest Signal of Nectar Rewards in a Bird-Pollinated Tree (Fuchsia excorticata, Onagraceae)". Plant Ecology. 225 (3): 227–233. doi:10.1007/s11258-023-01390-6. ISSN 1385-0237.
- McGlone, Matt S.; Dungan, Roger J.; Hall, Graeme M.J.; Allen, Robert B. (2004). "Winter Leaf Loss in the New Zealand Woody Flora". New Zealand Journal of Botany. 42 (1): 1–19. doi:10.1080/0028825X.2004.9512887. ISSN 0028-825X.
- Pekelharing, C.J.; Parkes, J.P.; Barker, R.J. (1998). "Possum (Trichosurus vulpecula) Densities and Impacts on Fuchsia (Fuchsia excorticata) in South Westland, New Zealand". New Zealand Journal of Ecology. 22 (2). New Zealand Ecological Society: 197–203. ISSN 0110-6465. JSTOR 24054692.
- Robertson, Alastair W.; Ladley, Jenny J.; Kelly, Dave; McNutt, Kate L.; Peterson, Paul G.; Merrett, Merilyn F.; Karl, Brian J. (2008). "Assessing Pollination and Fruit Dispersal in Fuchsia excorticata (Onagraceae)". New Zealand Journal of Botany. 46 (3): 299–314. doi:10.1080/00288250809509768. ISSN 0028-825X.
- Sopow, Stephanie L.; Bain, John (2017). "A checklist of New Zealand Cerambycidae (Insecta: Coleoptera), excluding Lamiinae". New Zealand Entomologist. 40 (2): 55–71. Bibcode:2017NZEnt..40...55S. doi:10.1080/00779962.2017.1357423. ISSN 0077-9962.
- Sultana, Niger; Macinnis‐Ng, Cate; Richardson, Sarah J.; Alam, Md Azharul; Cui, Xinglei; Wyse, Sarah V.; Laughlin, Daniel C.; Seward, Katherine; Perry, George L. W.; Curran, Timothy J. (2025). "Testing Key Tenets of Pyro‐Ecophysiology: Indicators of Drought Response in Relation to Shoot Flammability". American Journal of Botany. 112 (10). doi:10.1002/ajb2.70091. ISSN 0002-9122.
- Sweetapple, Peter; Nugent, Graham (1999). "Provenance Variation in Fuchsia (Fuchsia excorticata) in Relation to Palatability to Possums". New Zealand Journal of Ecology. 23 (1). New Zealand Ecological Society: 1–10. ISSN 0110-6465. JSTOR 24054741.
- Webby, Rosemary; Bloor, Stephen (1 August 2000). "Pigments in the Blue Pollen and Bee Pollen of Fuchsia excorticata". Zeitschrift für Naturforschung C. 55 (7–8): 503–505. doi:10.1515/znc-2000-7-803. ISSN 1865-7125.
- Wood, Jamie R.; Wilmshurst, Janet M.; Wagstaff, Steven J.; Worthy, Trevor H.; Rawlence, Nicolas J.; Cooper, Alan (2012). "High-Resolution Coproecology: Using Coprolites to Reconstruct the Habits and Habitats of New Zealand's Extinct Upland Moa (Megalapteryx didinus)". PLOS One. 7 (6) e40025. doi:10.1371/journal.pone.0040025. ISSN 1932-6203.
- Wyman, Tarryn E.; Trewick, Steve A.; Morgan‐Richards, Mary; Noble, Alasdair D. L. (2011). "Mutualism or Opportunism? Tree Fuchsia (Fuchsia excorticata) and Tree Weta (Hemideina) Interactions". Austral Ecology. 36 (3): 261–268. doi:10.1111/j.1442-9993.2010.02146.x. ISSN 1442-9985.
- Wyse, Sarah V.; Perry, George L. W.; O'Connell, Dean M.; Holland, Phillip S.; Wright, Monique J.; Hosted, Catherine L.; Whitelock, Samuel L.; Geary, Ian J.; Maurin, Kévin J. L.; Curran, Timothy J. (2016). "A Quantitative Assessment of Shoot Flammability for 60 Tree and Shrub Species Supports Rankings Based on Expert Opinion". International Journal of Wildland Fire. 25 (4): 466. doi:10.1071/WF15047. hdl:10182/6884. ISSN 1049-8001.

Miscellaneous

- De Lange, Peter (2025). "Fuchsia excorticata". New Zealand Plant Conservation Network. Archived from the original on 19 July 2025.
- Esler, Lloyd (13 September 2025). "About the South: On Fuchsia Trees, Smelters and Shark Attacks". The Southland Times. Archived from the original on 15 September 2025.
- McCaskill, L.W. (27 May 1937). "Nature Notes — New Zealand Fuchsia". The Press. No. 22103.
- Svensson, M.S. (2025). "Prumnopitys taxifolia". IUCN Red List of Threatened Species. 2025 e.T254427020A254427022. doi:10.2305/IUCN.UK.2025-1.RLTS.T254427020A254427022.en.
- "New Zealand Fuchsias". The Star. No. 20860. 1 July 1931.
- "Fuchsia excorticata (J.R.Forst. & G.Forst.) L.f." Plants of the World Online. Archived from the original on 19 May 2025 – via Royal Botanic Gardens, Kew.
- "Ngā Rauropi Whakaoranga — Fuchsia excorticata. Kōtukutuku. Kōnini. Tree fuchsia". Manaaki Whenua – Landcare Research. 2023. Archived from the original on 30 January 2025.
