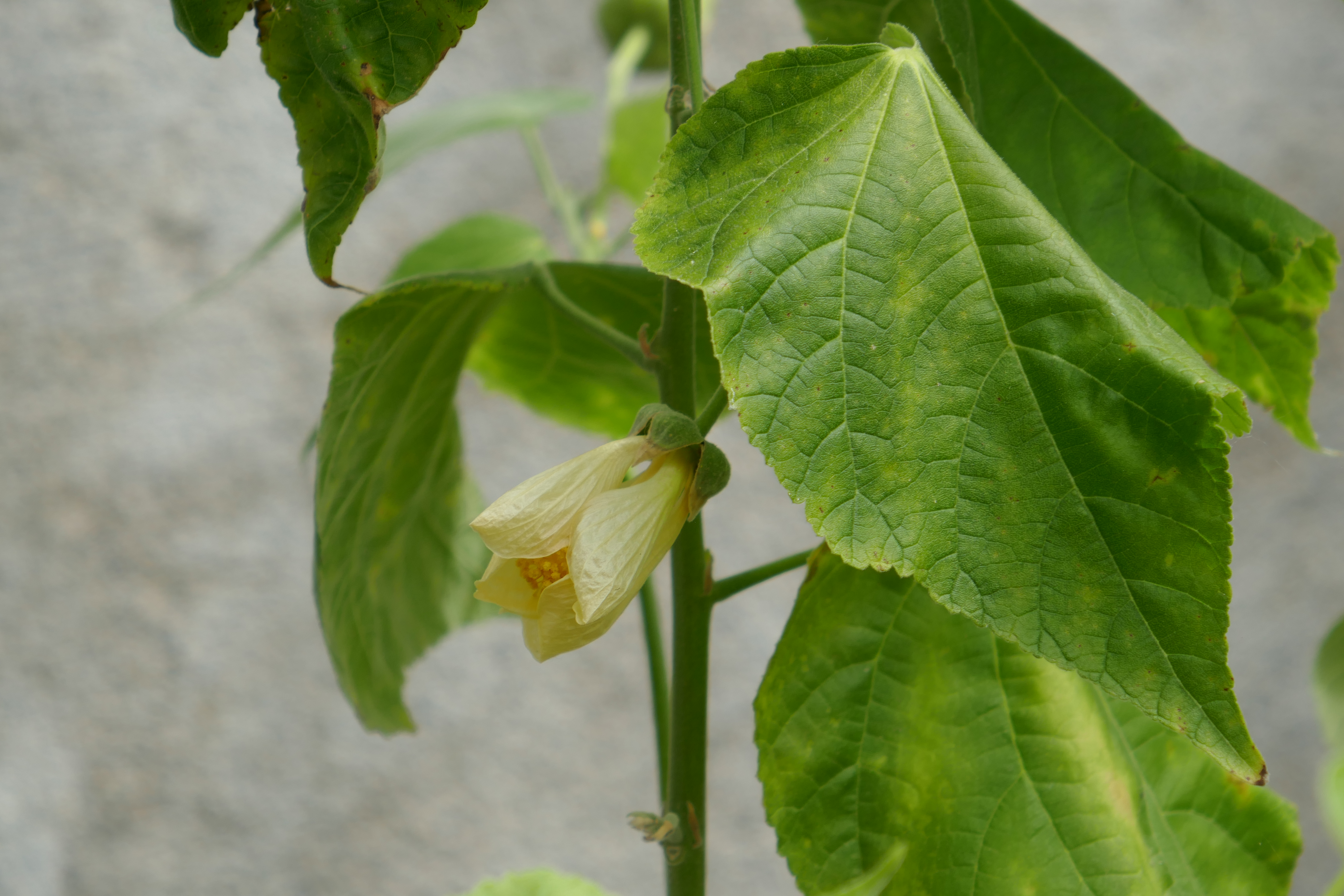

Conservation status
- Extinct in the Wild (IUCN 3.1)

Scientific classification
- Kingdom: Plantae
- Clade: Tracheophytes
- Clade: Angiosperms
- Clade: Eudicots
- Clade: Rosids
- Order: Malvales
- Family: Malvaceae
- Genus: Abutilon
- Species: A. pitcairnense

Binomial name
- Abutilon pitcairnense Fosberg
- Distribution; Extinct

= Abutilon pitcairnense =

Species of plant

Abutilon pitcairnense, the yellow fatu or yellow fautu, is a species of shrub in the family Malvaceae that was native to Pitcairn Island, but is now extinct in the wild. It was once considered extinct, until a single plant was discovered on the island in 2003. At that time, cuttings and seed were used to propagate several plants at a nursery on the island and botanical gardens in Ireland and England. The last wild surviving plant died in a landslide in 2005.

== Description ==
Abutilon pitcairnense is a spreading shrub, growing 1 m (3.3 ft) tall with nodding bell-shaped yellow flowers that have 3 cm (1.2 in) long petals. The alternate leaves are 13 cm (5.1 in) by 9 cm (3.5 in). The plant is native to unstable slopes, flowering from July to August.

== Taxonomy ==
Abutilon pitcairnense was discovered in 1934 by two American botanists, Harold St. John and Francis Raymond Fosberg, and named after the island.

== Conservation and habitat ==
Specimen at National Botanic Garden, Ireland

The plant is native to tiny Pitcairn Island (3 by 2 km (1.9 by 1.2 mi)), a remote island between New Zealand and South America which is mostly known for being settled by the mutineers from HMS Bounty. After being considered extinct for twenty years, a single plant was found growing in native forest of Homalium taypau and Metrosideros collina in 2003. Vegetative propagation, along with seed from the plant, were used to establish a small population on the island's nursery, with some propagation material also being sent to Trinity College Botanic Gardens, Dublin. A landslide killed the only wild plant in 2005, making the plant extinct in the wild. Cuttings from the Trinity College collection were taken to the National Botanic Gardens of Ireland, Glasnevin in 2007, and later to the Royal Botanical Gardens, Kew.

The forest where the plant is native is threatened by invasive species, with the Homalium taypau trees under competition from Syzygium jambos and Lantana camara. Chemical control of the invasive plants, along with reintroduction of native species, have had some success. In 2011, there were plans to attempt the reintroduction of Abutilon pitcairnense to the island. There are also plans for a more thorough search of the island for surviving native plants during July and August, the flowering season of Abutilon pitcairnense. In 2018, it was reported that the Royal Botanical Gardens in Kew had stored seeds in the Millennium Seed Bank at Wakehurst and were working on propagating the plant.

== Further resources ==
- "Yellow Fatu (Abutilon pitcairnense)". Mohamed bin Zayed Species Conservation Fund.
- "Botanist preserves rare abutilon". Royal Horticultural Society. Archived from the original on 2012-09-30.
- "Yellow Fatu". Indipex International Stamp Exhibition.
