= Ascarina coursii =

Scientific classification
- Kingdom: Plantae
- Clade: Tracheophytes
- Clade: Angiosperms
- Order: Chloranthales
- Family: Chloranthaceae
- Genus: Ascarina
- Species: A. coursii

Binomial name
- Ascarina coursii (Humbert & Capuron) J.-F.Leroy & Jérémie

Synonyms
- Ascarinopsis coursii Humbert & Capuron

Species of flowering plant

Ascarina coursii is a species of plant native to Madagascar. Within the genus Ascarina, there are about a dozen accepted species; A. coursii is the only one endemic to Madagascar. Its habitat is a "seasonally dry tropical biome".

== Classification ==
Ascarina coursii was first described as Ascarinopsis coursii by Humbert & Capuron in 1955. Along with Ascarina solmsiana and Ascarina philippinensis, the three plants may form a clade or basal grade within their genus.

== Description ==
This plant's leaves are between 75 and 140 mm (3.0 and 5.5 in) in length. It has 2-5 stamens and one bract.

== Further readings ==
- Doyle, James A.; Eklund, Helena; Herendeen, Patrick S. (September 2003). "Floral Evolution in Chloranthaceae: Implications of a Morphological Phylogenetic Analysis". International Journal of Plant Sciences. 164 (S5): S365–S382. Bibcode:2003IJPlS.164S.365D. doi:10.1086/377064. ISSN 1058-5893.
