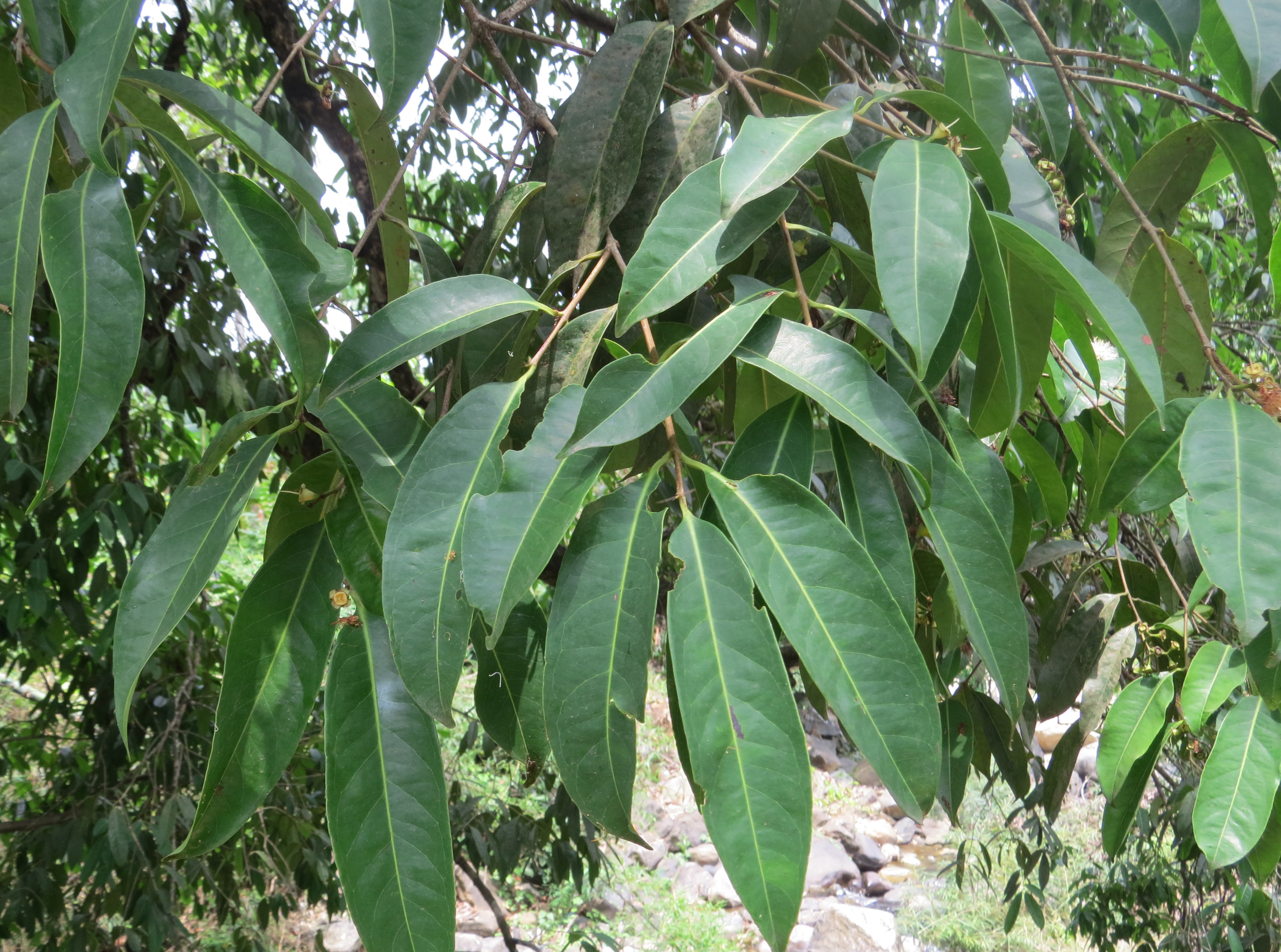

Conservation status
- Least Concern (IUCN 3.1)

Scientific classification
- Kingdom: Plantae
- Clade: Tracheophytes
- Clade: Angiosperms
- Clade: Eudicots
- Clade: Rosids
- Order: Myrtales
- Family: Myrtaceae
- Genus: Syzygium
- Species: S. hemisphericum

Binomial name
- Syzygium hemisphericum (Wight) Alston

Synonyms
- Eugenia chanlos Gagnep.; Eugenia hemispherica Wight; Jambosa hemispherica (Wight) Walp.; Strongylocalyx hemisphaericus (Wight) Blume; Syzygium chanlos (Gagnep.) Merr. & L.M.Perry

= Syzygium hemisphericum =

Species of flowering plant

Syzygium hemisphericum is a flowering plant species in the family Myrtaceae, commonly called the hemispheric rose-apple. It is also known as teal-naval, vellanara, vellai-naval, goljamb, vennaval, redi jambul, makki nerale, payanjaval, vennjara, vellanjara, ven-nyara, venjara, tholnjaval, venyara and kaadu pannerale. It is a tree native to western India, Sri Lanka, Cambodia, Laos, Thailand, and Vietnam.

== Description ==
Syzygium hemisphericum is a medium-sized tree up to 20 metres (66 ft) tall. Its bark is smooth, greyish brown, and blaze cream in colour. Branches and branchlets are terete, and glabrous. Leaves are simple, opposite, and decussate. Petiole is 0.5–1.5 centimetres (0.2–0.6 in) long, canaliculate. Stigma is slightly acute. Fruits are a purple berry crowned by calyx lobes. Flowering and fruiting season is from March to June.

== Habitat ==
This plant grows in abundance in the Western Ghats of India, where it prefers moist evergreen and shola forests from 300 to 1,400 metres elevation. It grows in the sub-canopy, where it is associated with Machilus macranthus, Homalium ceylanicum, Mitragyna parvifolia, and other tree species.

== Uses ==
It is used in folk medicine.

== Gallery ==
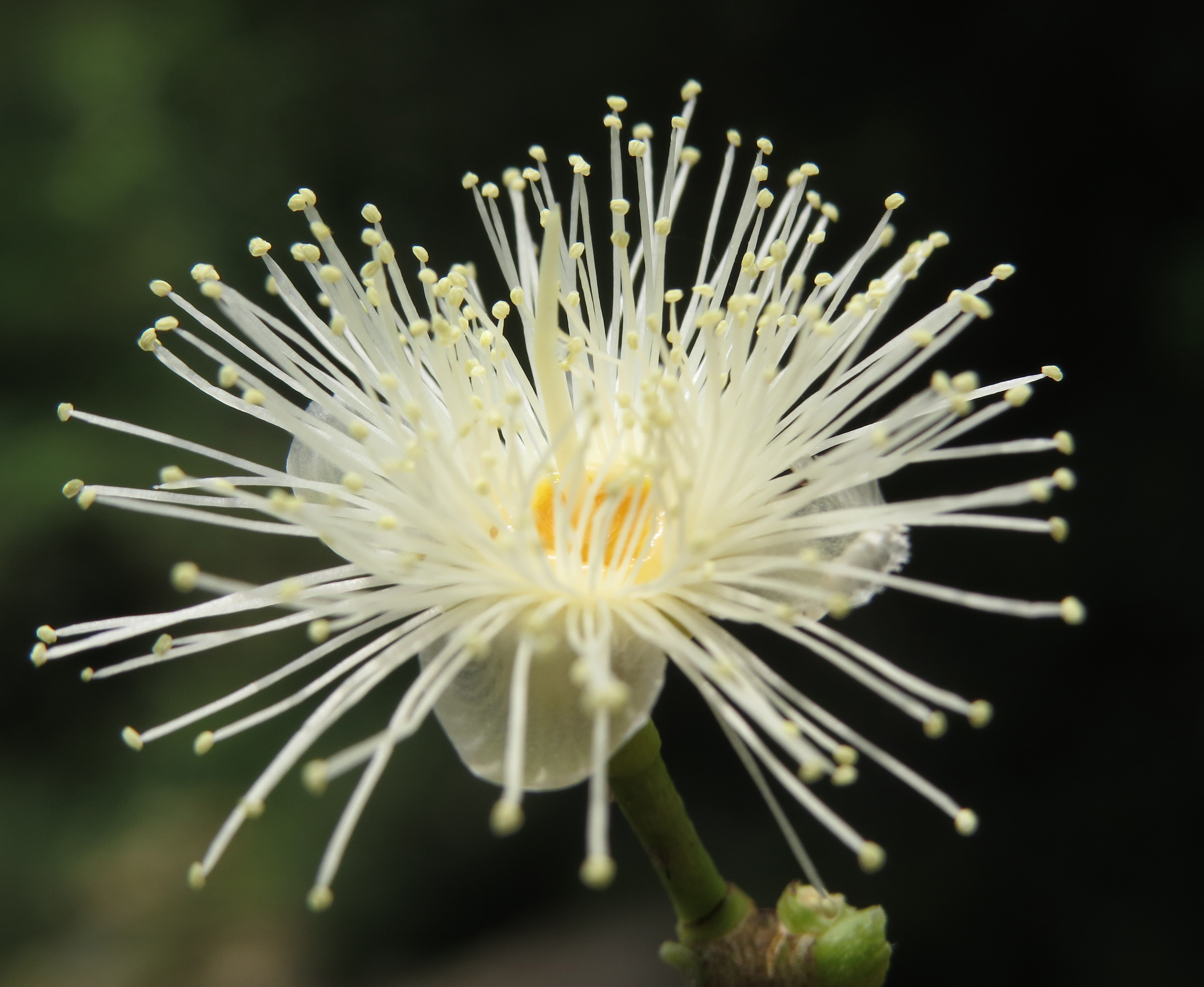

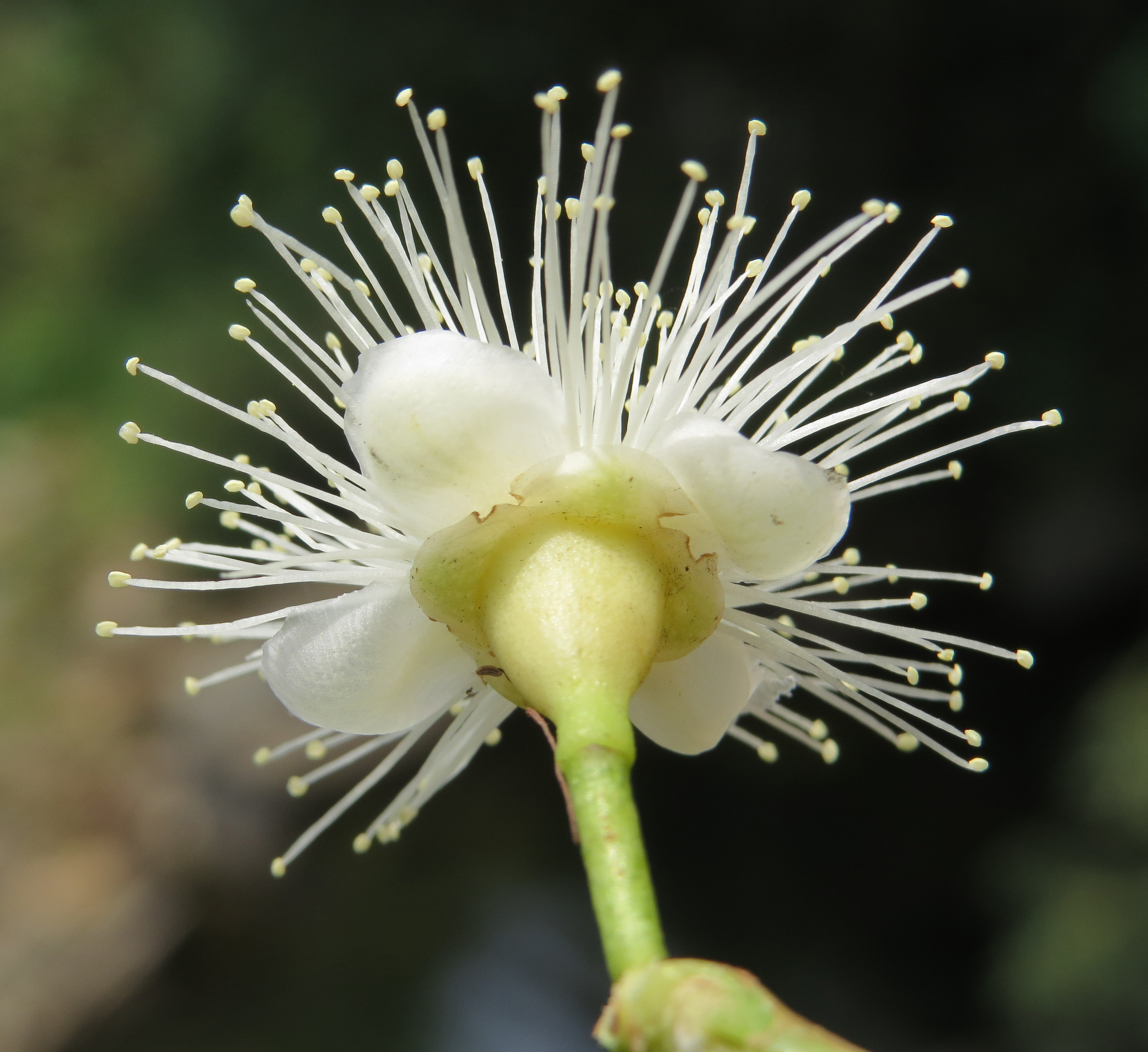

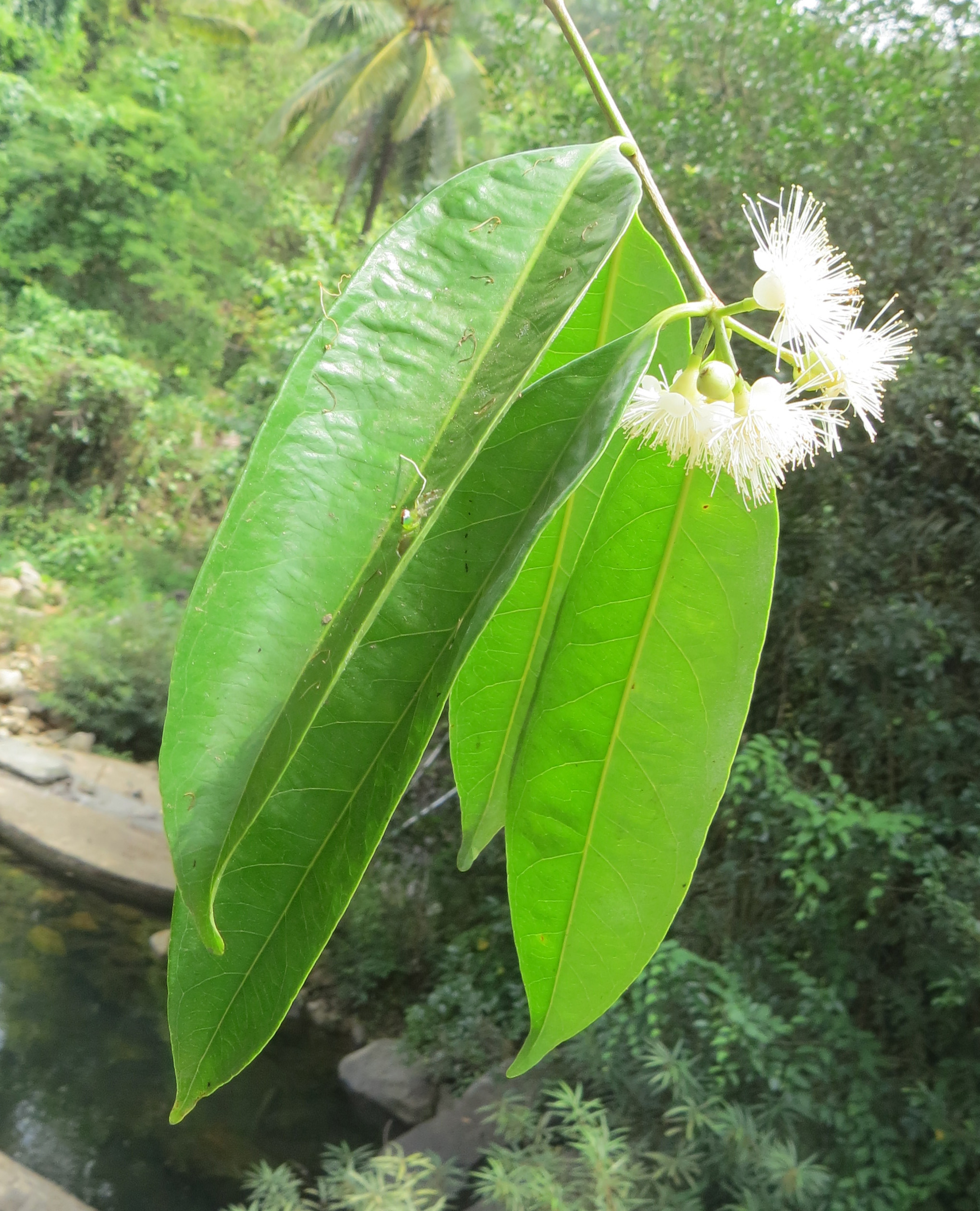

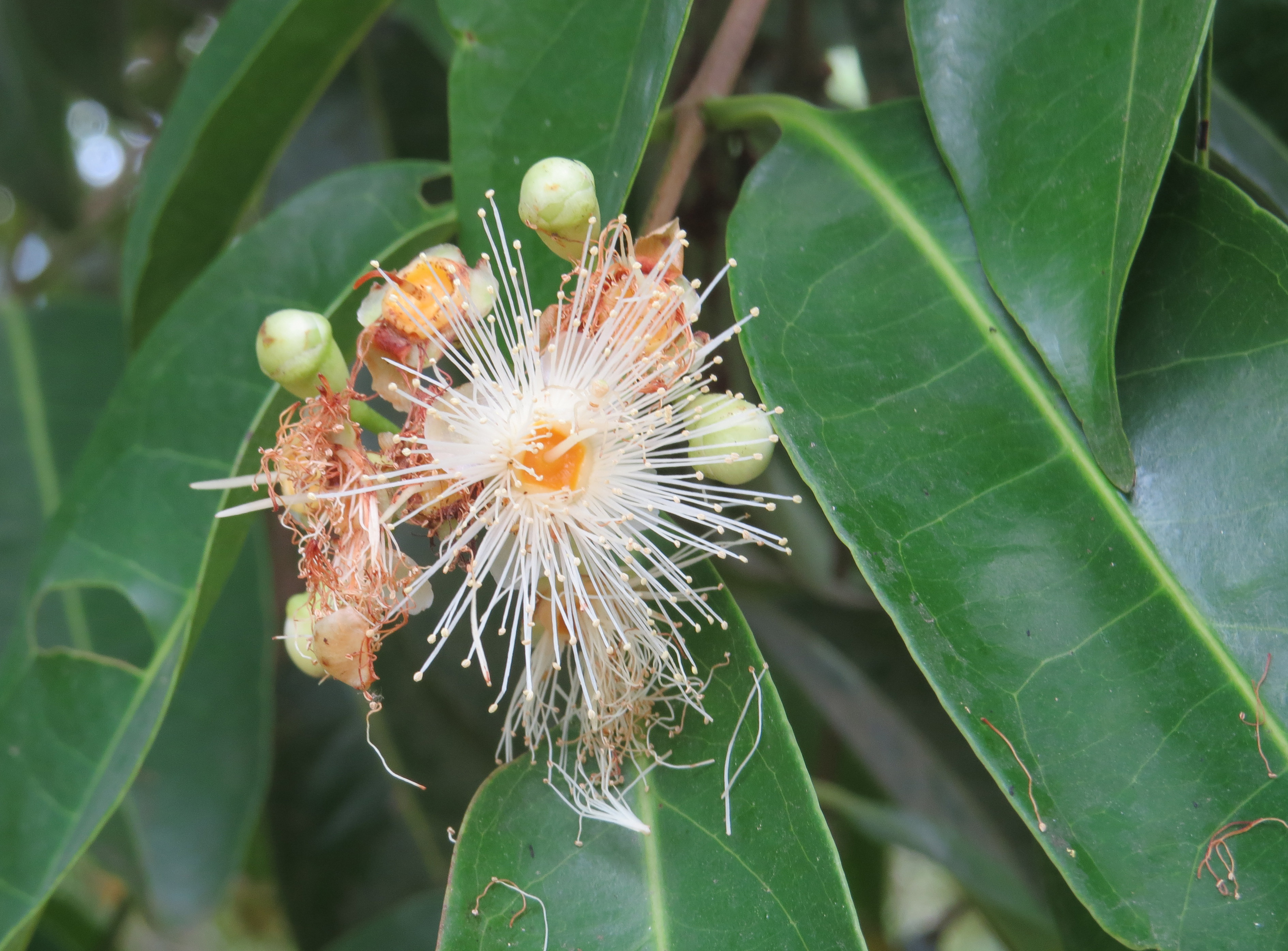

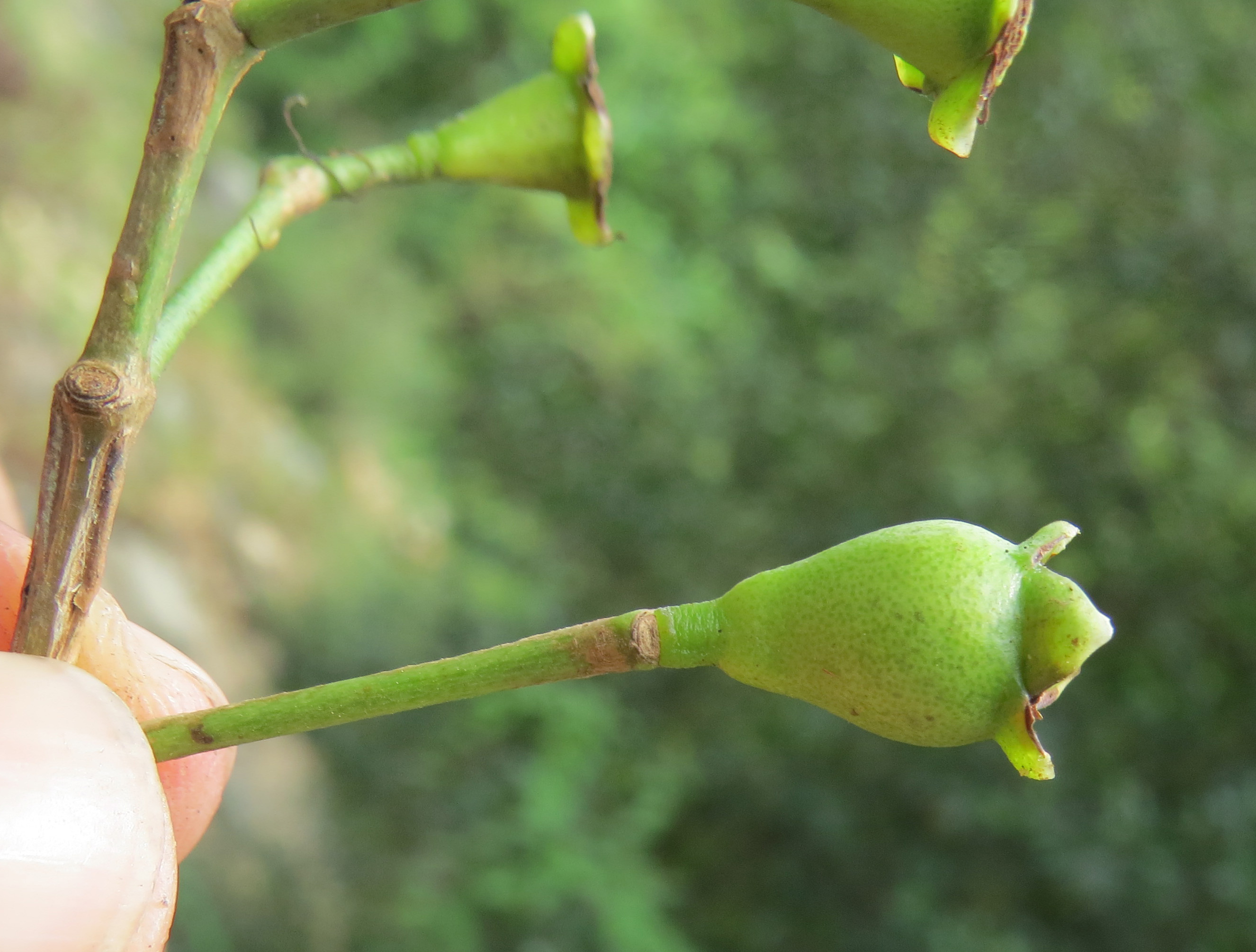

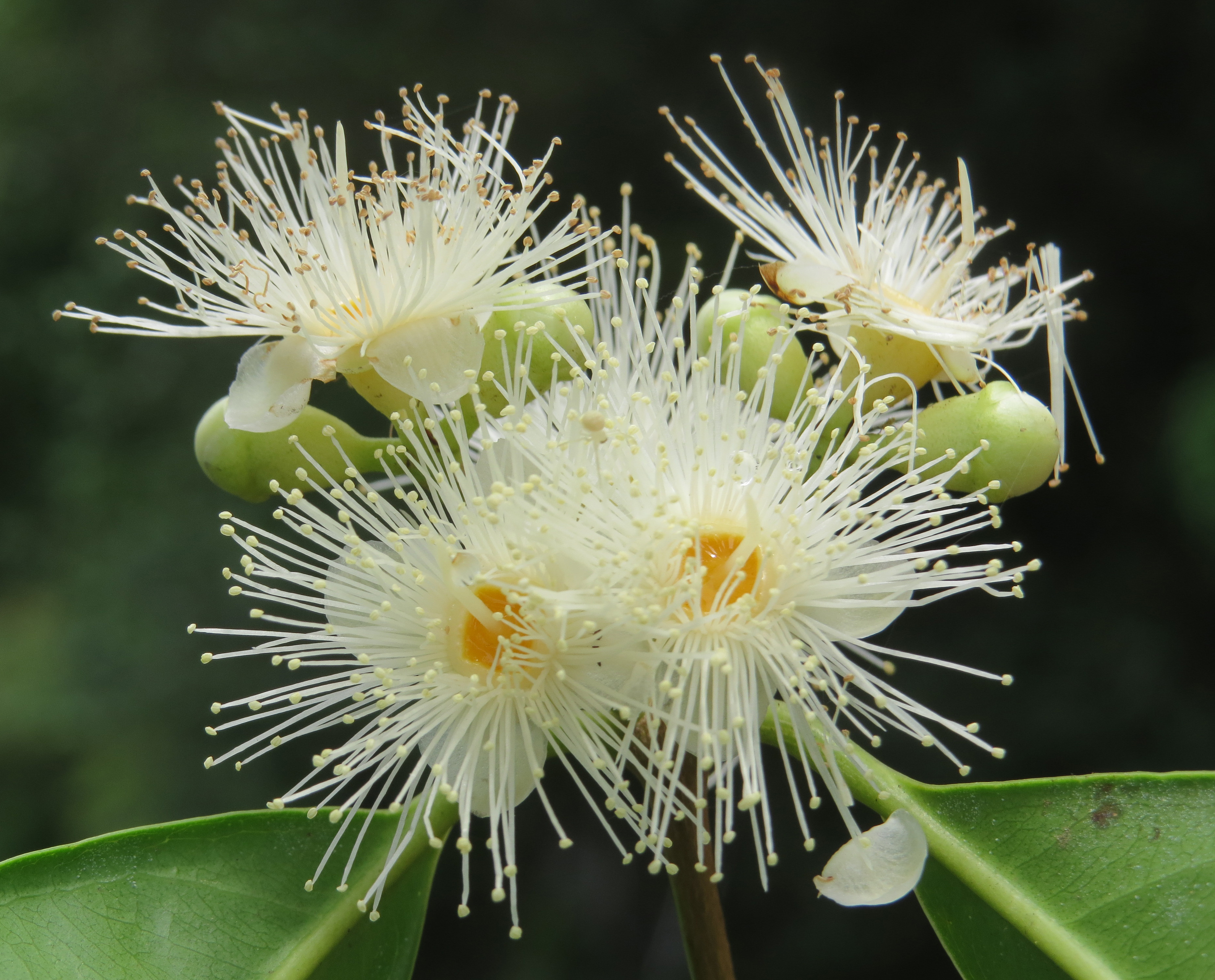
