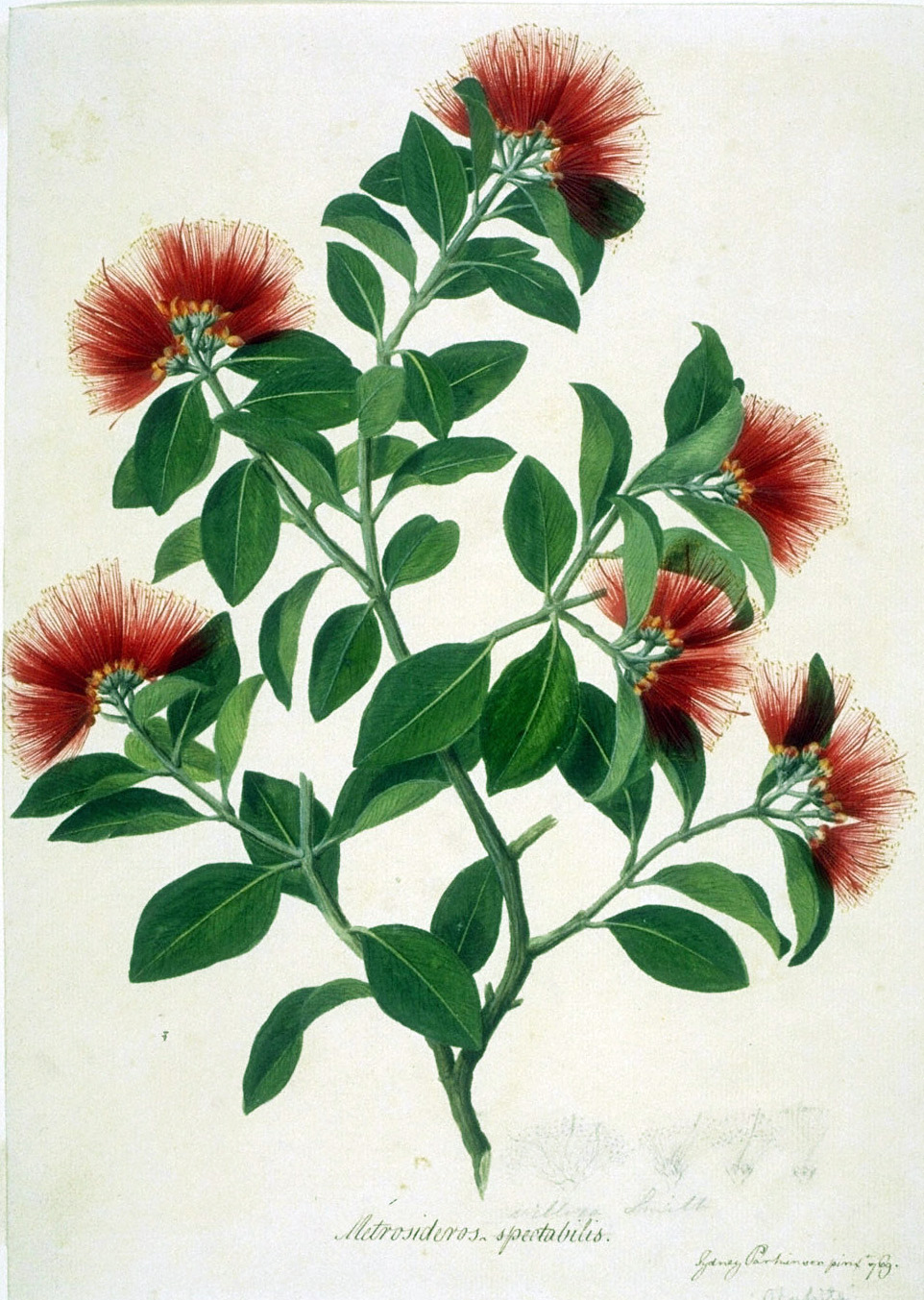

Conservation status
- Least Concern (IUCN 3.1)

Scientific classification
- Kingdom: Plantae
- Clade: Tracheophytes
- Clade: Angiosperms
- Clade: Eudicots
- Clade: Rosids
- Order: Myrtales
- Family: Myrtaceae
- Genus: Metrosideros
- Species: M. collina

Binomial name
- Metrosideros collina (J.R.Forst. & G.Forst.) A.Gray (1854)

Synonyms
- Leptospermum collinum J.R.Forst. & G.Forst. (1776); Nania collina (J.R.Forst. & G.Forst.) Kuntze (1891)

= Metrosideros collina =

Species of flowering plant

Metrosideros collina, commonly known as rata, or Polynesian metersideros, is a species of flowering plant in the family Myrtaceae. It is a tree or shrub native to French Polynesia, the Cook Islands, and the Pitcairn Islands.

== Taxonomy ==
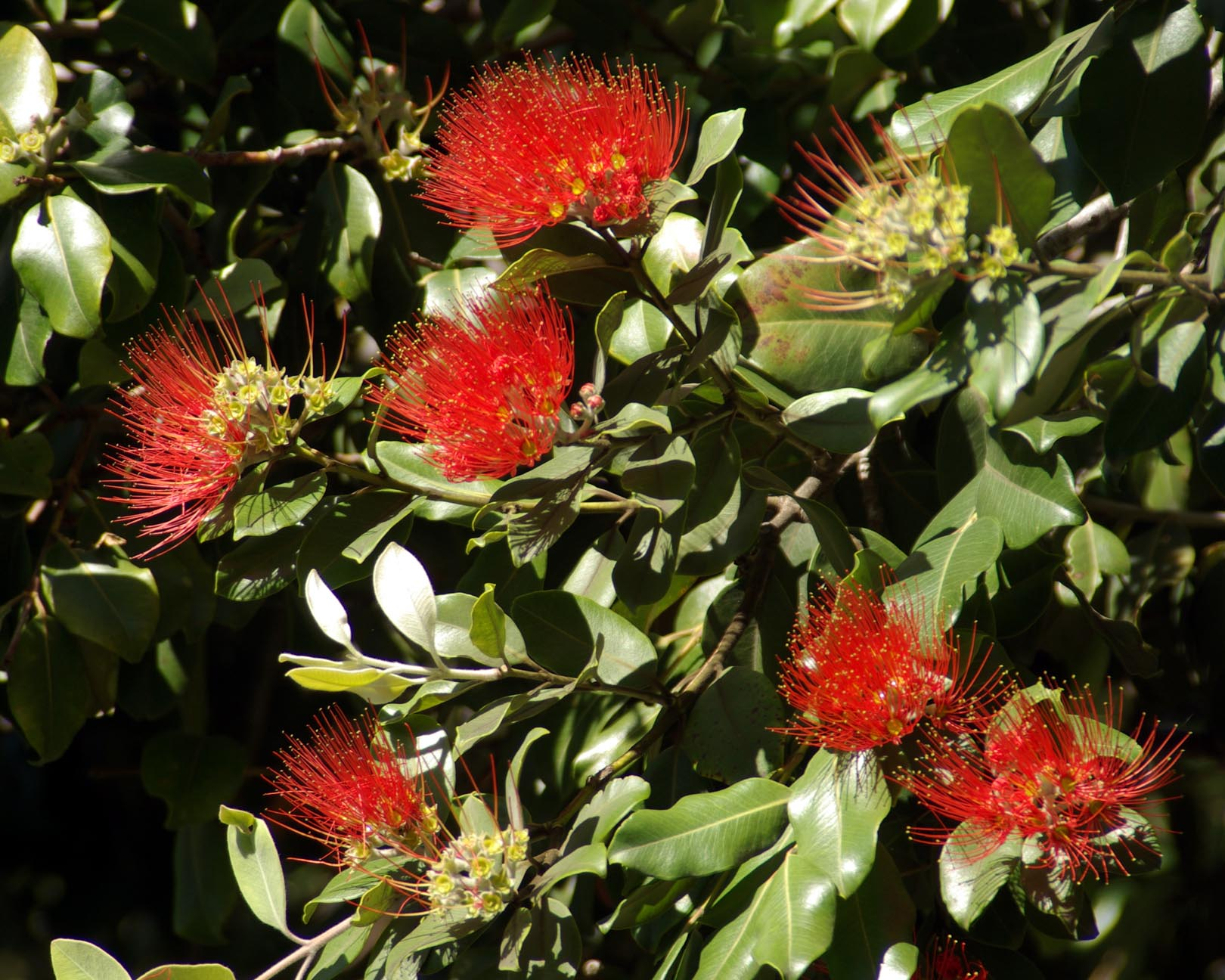
M. collina var villosa in Royal Tasmanian Botanical Gardens, Hobart

The species was first formally described by botanist Johann Reinhold Forster and his son Georg Forster in 1776. It was given the name Leptospermum collinum.

M. collina was formerly thought to have a larger range, extending to Vanuatu, Fiji, and the Samoan Islands. A phylogenetic study, published in 2015 by Pillon et al., found that M. collina comprised two genetically distinct groups, and the populations in Vanuatu, Fiji, and Samoa were recognized as a distinct species, M. vitiensis.

== Habitat ==
In the Society Islands, Metrosideros collina is a common canopy tree in montane rain forests above 300 metres (980 ft) elevation, and in cloud forests from 400 to 1,000 metres (1,300 to 3,300 ft) elevation, and on exposed ridges.

In the Marquesas Islands, Metrosideros collina is common on drier and more exposed montane forests, in cloud forests, and in shrub form in windswept mountaintop shrublands.

On Rarotonga in the Cook Islands, Metrosideros collina is the dominant tree in cloud forests on the island's cloud-shrouded peaks and ridges above 400 metres (1,300 ft) elevation. M. collina and associated trees, including Pterophylla samoensis, Elaeocarpus floridanus, and Pittosporum rarotongense, form a low forest canopy averaging eight meters tall. In wetter areas and at higher elevations Ascarina diffusa is often co-dominant or dominant in the canopy. M. collina is also found in lower-elevation rainforests dominated by Homalium acuminatum.

Metrosideros collina is a common canopy tree in higher-elevation interior forests on Pitcairn Island, with the trees Homalium mouo, Ficus prolixa, Pandanus tectorius, and Thespesia populnea.

== Varieties ==
There are two accepted varieties:

- Metrosideros collina var. collina – Society Islands
- Metrosideros collina var. villosa – Cook Islands, Marquesas Islands, Pitcairn Islands, Society Islands, Tuamotu, and Tubuai Islands.

== Cultivars ==
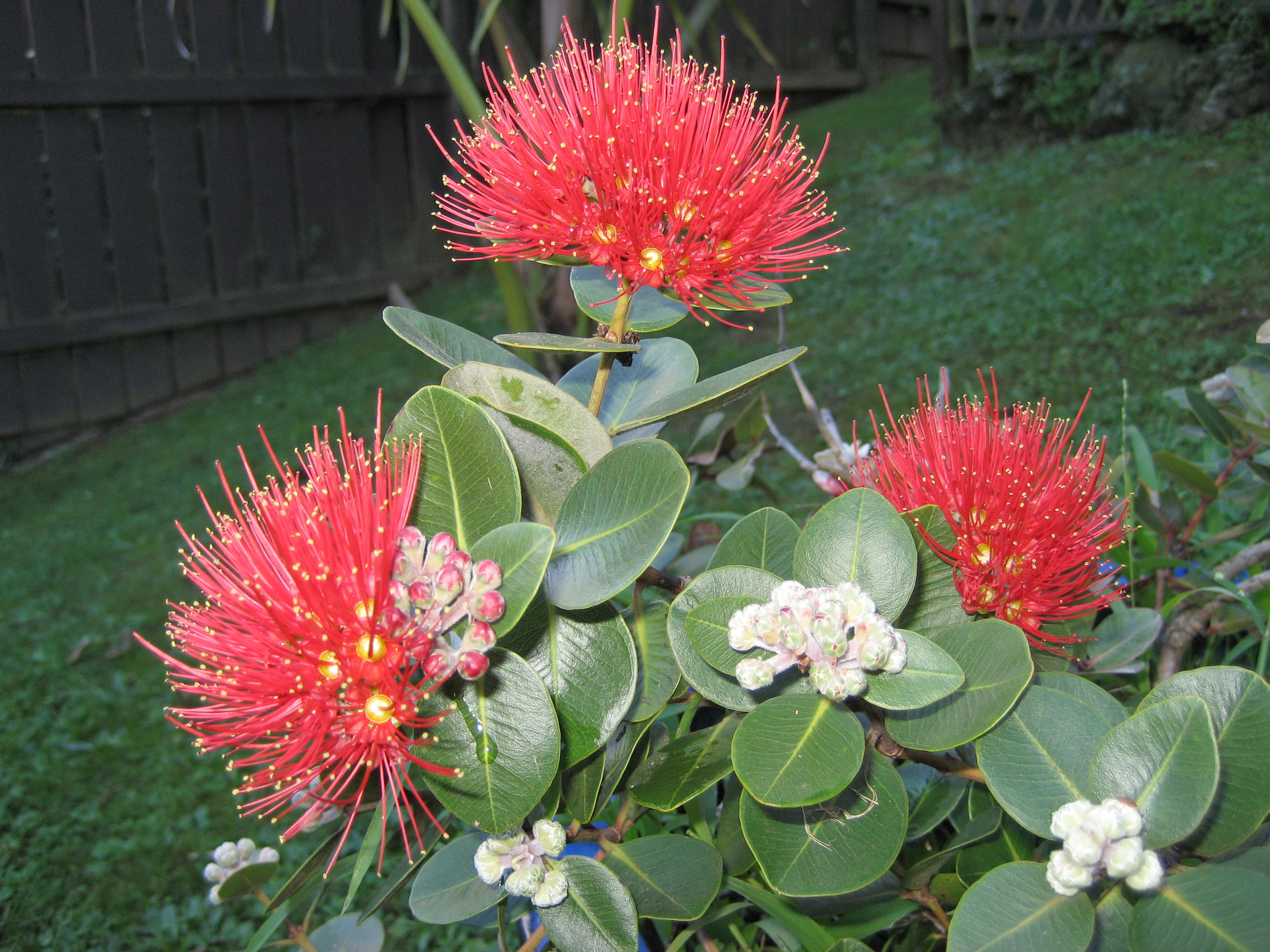
Cultivar 'Tahiti'

Cultivars of Metrosideros collina are used as ornamental plants, for planting in tropical and subtropical climate gardens. Cultivars include:

- 'Tahiti', grows to about 1 metre (3 ft 3 in),
- 'Tahitian sunset', a mutated form of 'Tahiti' with variegated leaves
