= Homalium travancoricum =

Conservation status
- Vulnerable (IUCN 2.3)

Scientific classification
- Kingdom: Plantae
- Clade: Tracheophytes
- Clade: Angiosperms
- Clade: Eudicots
- Clade: Rosids
- Order: Malpighiales
- Family: Salicaceae
- Genus: Homalium
- Species: H. travancoricum

Binomial name
- Homalium travancoricum Beddome

Species of flowering plant

Homalium travancoricum is a species of plant in the family Salicaceae. It is native to Kerala and Tamil Nadu in India.
