= Homalium smythei =

Conservation status
- Vulnerable (IUCN 2.3)

Scientific classification
- Kingdom: Plantae
- Clade: Tracheophytes
- Clade: Angiosperms
- Clade: Eudicots
- Clade: Rosids
- Order: Malpighiales
- Family: Salicaceae
- Genus: Homalium
- Species: H. smythei

Binomial name
- Homalium smythei Hutch. & Dalziel

Synonyms
- Homalium aubrevillei Keay; Homalium djalonis A.Chev. ex Hutch. & Dalziel

Species of flowering plant

Homalium smythei is a species of flowering plant in the family Salicaceae. It is found in Ivory Coast, Guinea, Liberia, and Sierra Leone. It is threatened by habitat loss.
