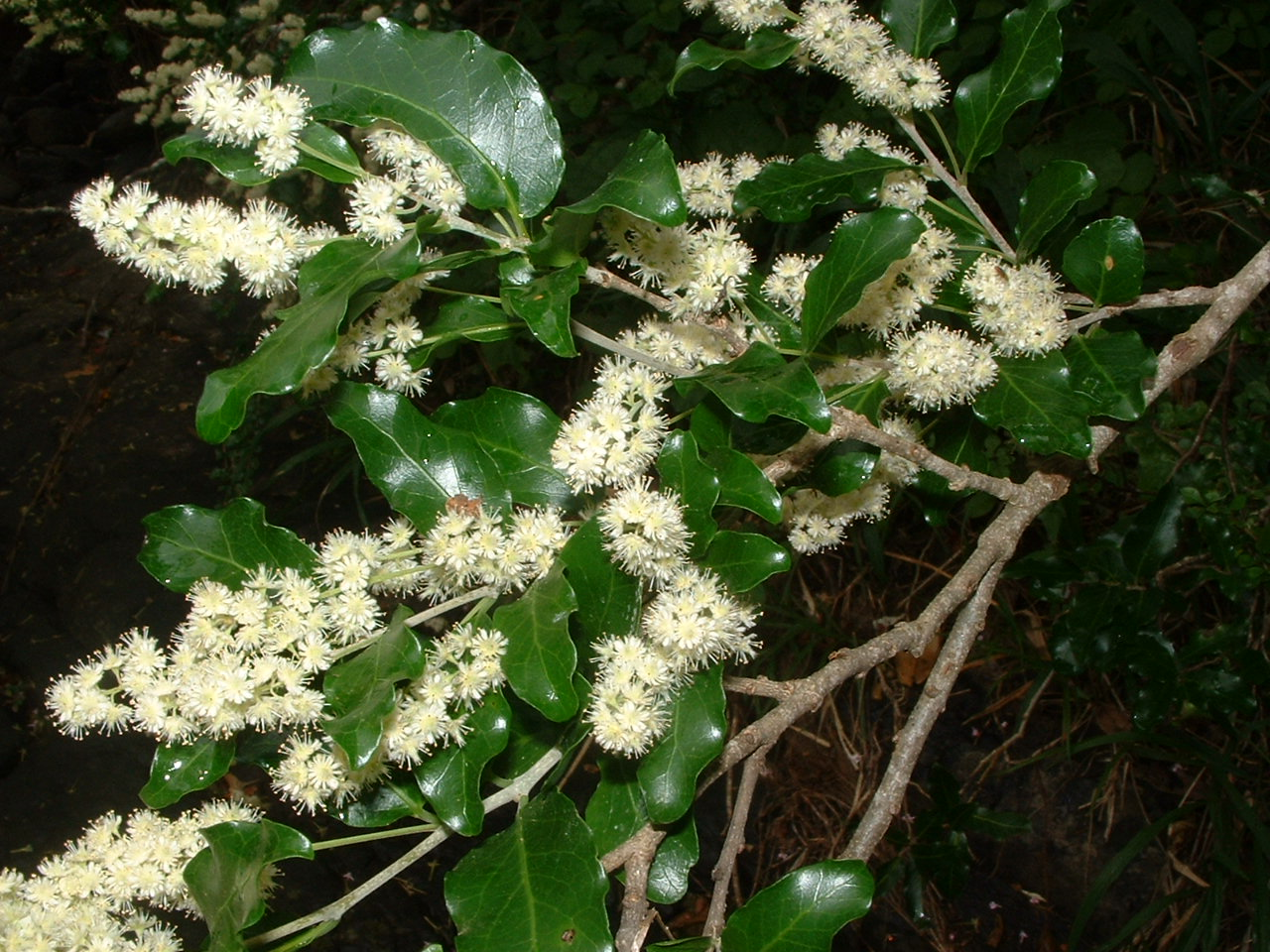
- Flowers of Homalium rufescens

Conservation status
- Least Concern (IUCN 2.3)

Scientific classification
- Kingdom: Plantae
- Clade: Embryophytes
- Clade: Tracheophytes
- Clade: Angiosperms
- Clade: Eudicots
- Clade: Rosids
- Order: Malpighiales
- Family: Salicaceae
- Genus: Homalium
- Species: H. rufescens

Binomial name
- Homalium rufescens Benth.

Synonyms
- Blakwellia rufescens (Benth.) Harv.; Pythagorea africana E.Mey.; Pythagorea rufescens E.Mey. ex Arn.

= Homalium rufescens =

Species of flowering plant

Homalium rufescens is a species of plant in the family Salicaceae. It is commonly called the Small-leaved Brown-Ironwood. It is a shrub or tree endemic to the Eastern Cape and KwaZulu-Natal provinces of South Africa.
