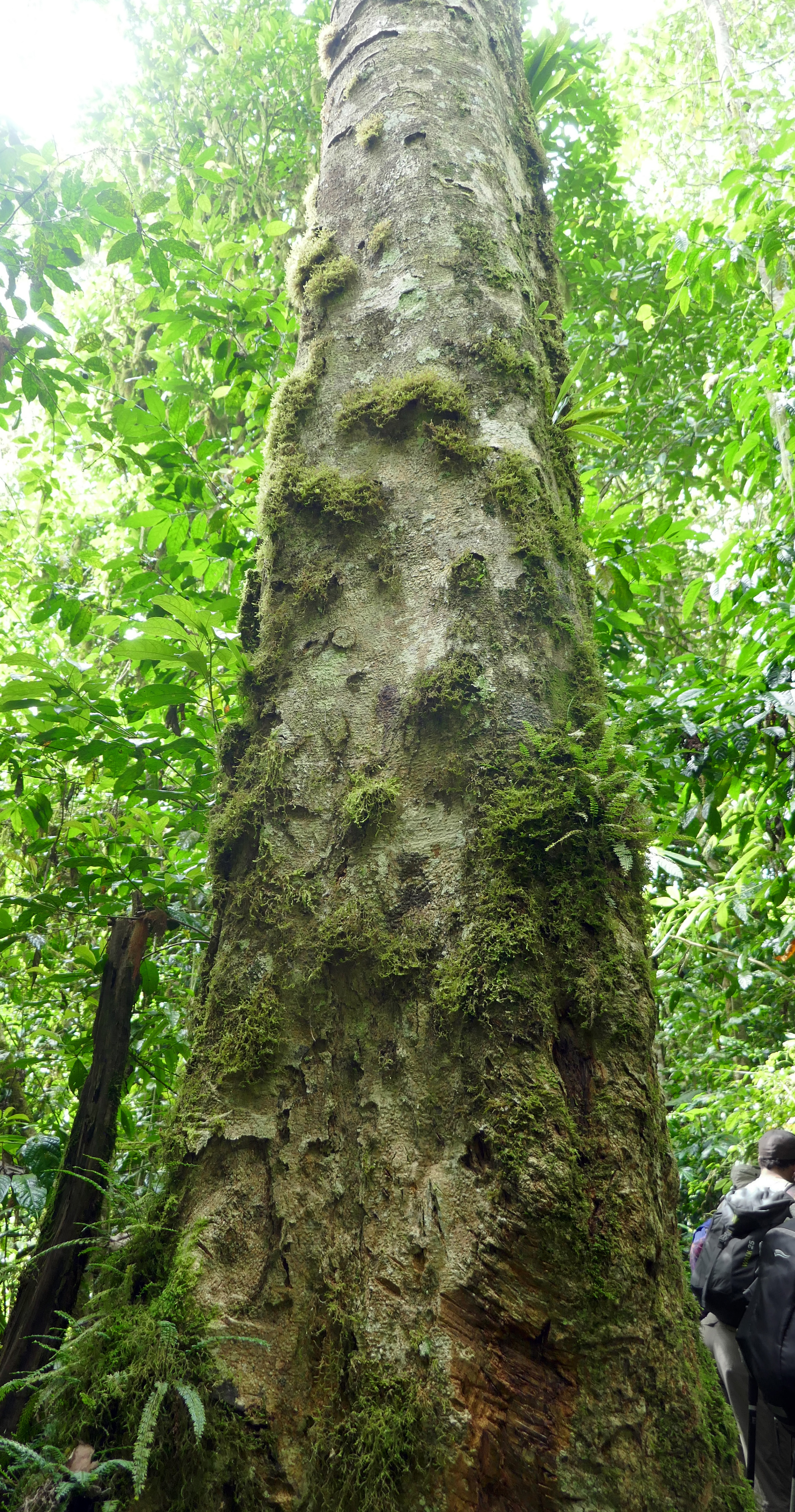

Conservation status
- Near Threatened (IUCN 2.3)

Scientific classification
- Kingdom: Plantae
- Clade: Tracheophytes
- Clade: Angiosperms
- Clade: Eudicots
- Clade: Rosids
- Order: Malpighiales
- Family: Salicaceae
- Genus: Homalium
- Species: H. henriquesii

Binomial name
- Homalium henriquesii Gilg

= Homalium henriquesii =

Species of flowering plant

Homalium henriquesii is a species of flowering plant in the family Salicaceae. It is endemic to São Tomé and Príncipe.
