= Homalium buxifolium =

Conservation status
- Endangered (IUCN 2.3)

Scientific classification
- Kingdom: Plantae
- Clade: Embryophytes
- Clade: Tracheophytes
- Clade: Spermatophytes
- Clade: Angiosperms
- Clade: Eudicots
- Clade: Rosids
- Order: Malpighiales
- Family: Salicaceae
- Genus: Homalium
- Species: H. buxifolium

Binomial name
- Homalium buxifolium Daniker

Species of flowering plant

Homalium buxifolium is a species of plant in the family Salicaceae. It is endemic to New Caledonia.
