= Homalium mathieuanum =

Conservation status
- Endangered (IUCN 2.3)

Scientific classification
- Kingdom: Plantae
- Clade: Embryophytes
- Clade: Tracheophytes
- Clade: Spermatophytes
- Clade: Angiosperms
- Clade: Eudicots
- Clade: Rosids
- Order: Malpighiales
- Family: Salicaceae
- Genus: Homalium
- Species: H. mathieuanum

Binomial name
- Homalium mathieuanum (Vieill.) Briq.

Synonyms
- Blakwellia mathieuana Vieill. (1866); Homalium polyandrum Warb.

Species of flowering plant

Homalium mathieuanum is a species of plant in the family Salicaceae. It is a shrub endemic to northwestern New Caledonia.

The species was first described as Blakwellia mathieuana by Eugène Vieillard in 1866. In 1898 John Isaac Briquet placed the species in genus Homalium as H. mathieuanum.
