= Homalium polystachyum =

Conservation status
- Critically Endangered (IUCN 3.1)

Scientific classification
- Kingdom: Plantae
- Clade: Tracheophytes
- Clade: Angiosperms
- Clade: Eudicots
- Clade: Rosids
- Order: Malpighiales
- Family: Salicaceae
- Genus: Homalium
- Species: H. polystachyum

Binomial name
- Homalium polystachyum (Vieill.) Briq.

Synonyms
- Blakwellia polystachya Vieill.

Species of flowering plant

Homalium polystachyum is a species of flowering plant in the family Salicaceae. It is a tree endemic to northern New Caledonia.

The species was first described as Blakwellia polystachya by Eugène Vieillard in 1866. In 1898 John Isaac Briquet placed the species in genus Homalium as H. polystachyum.
