= Homalium patoklaense =

Conservation status
- Vulnerable (IUCN 2.3)

Scientific classification
- Kingdom: Plantae
- Clade: Tracheophytes
- Clade: Angiosperms
- Clade: Eudicots
- Clade: Rosids
- Order: Malpighiales
- Family: Salicaceae
- Genus: Homalium
- Species: H. patoklaense

Binomial name
- Homalium patoklaense Aubrev. & Pellegrin

Species of flowering plant

Homalium patoklaense is a species of plant in the family Salicaceae. It is found in Ivory Coast and Gabon.
