= Homalium rubrocostatum =

Conservation status
- Endangered (IUCN 3.1)

Scientific classification
- Kingdom: Plantae
- Clade: Embryophytes
- Clade: Tracheophytes
- Clade: Spermatophytes
- Clade: Angiosperms
- Clade: Eudicots
- Clade: Rosids
- Order: Malpighiales
- Family: Salicaceae
- Genus: Homalium
- Species: H. rubrocostatum

Binomial name
- Homalium rubrocostatum Sleumer

Species of flowering plant

Homalium rubrocostatum is a species of flowering plant in the family Salicaceae. It is a shrub or subshrub endemic to west-central New Caledonia.
