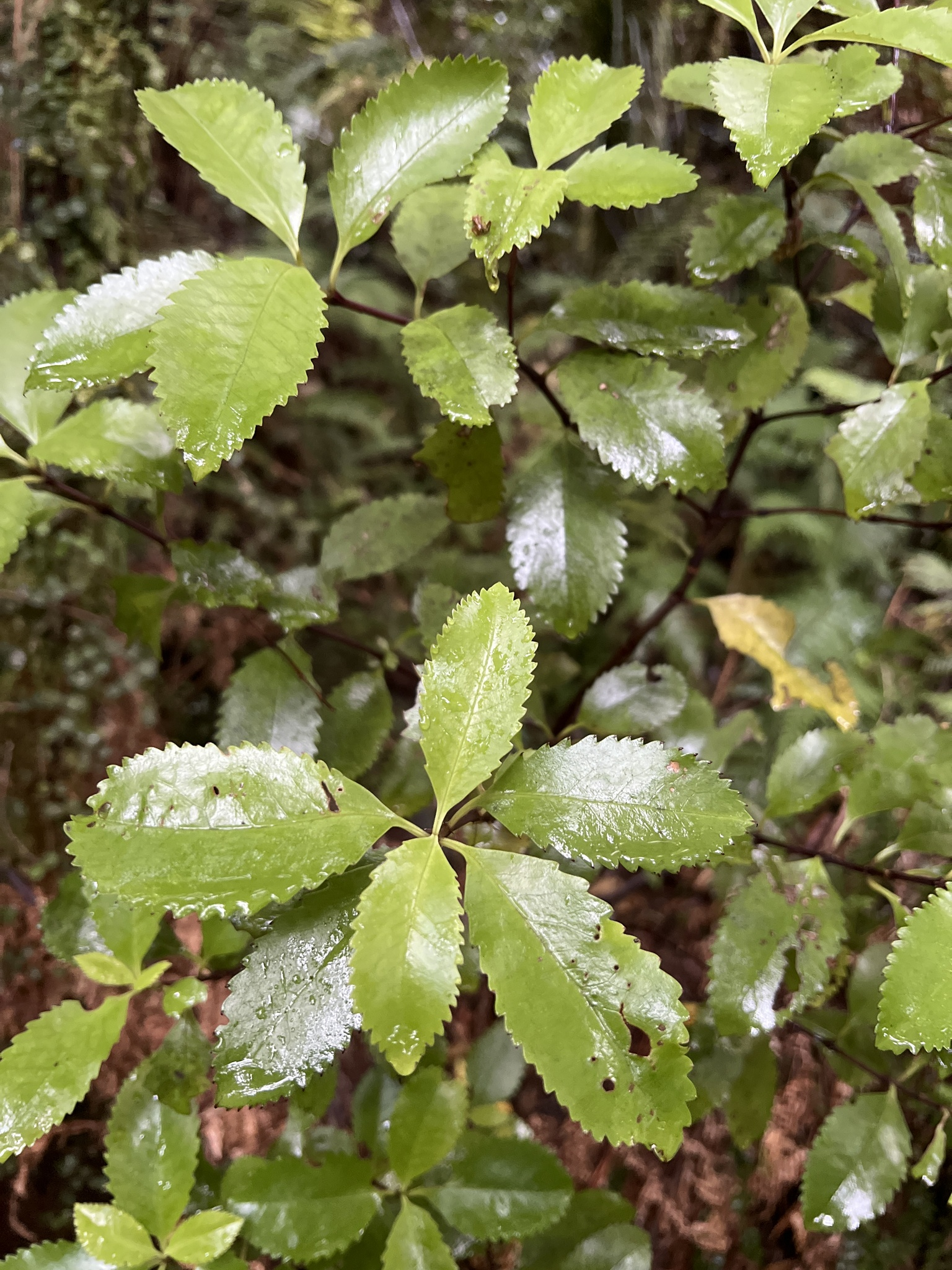
- Foliage of Ascarina lucida

Conservation status
- Not Threatened (NZ TCS)

Scientific classification
- Kingdom: Plantae
- Clade: Embryophytes
- Clade: Tracheophytes
- Clade: Spermatophytes
- Clade: Angiosperms
- Order: Chloranthales
- Family: Chloranthaceae
- Genus: Ascarina
- Species: A. lucida

Binomial name
- Ascarina lucida Hook.f.

= Ascarina lucida =

Species of flowering plant

Ascarina lucida, commonly known as hutu, is a species of shrub or small tree in the family Chloranthaceae. It is endemic to New Zealand; its range mostly covers the western coast of the South Island. It is also found in the North Island, but is uncommon there. It inhabits lowland and montane forests, and grows in various soil types. It reaches a height of up to 8 metres (30 feet). It has glossy leaves which have tipped teeth on their margins.

Ascarina lucida was first described by the British botanist Joseph Dalton Hooker in 1856. It is the only member of the family Chloranthaceae that is native to New Zealand. A 2011 study revealed, based on plastid DNA analysis, that its closest relative is A. polystachya of the Society Islands. A. lucida is wind-pollinated, with no evidence of insect pollination. Its fruit are dispersed by fruit-eating animals (frugivores), such as birds, and are eaten in abundance by the silvereye, a small native bird. Its maximum estimated lifespan is about 130 years. Its 2023 conservation status in the New Zealand Threat Classification System is "Not Threatened".

== Description ==
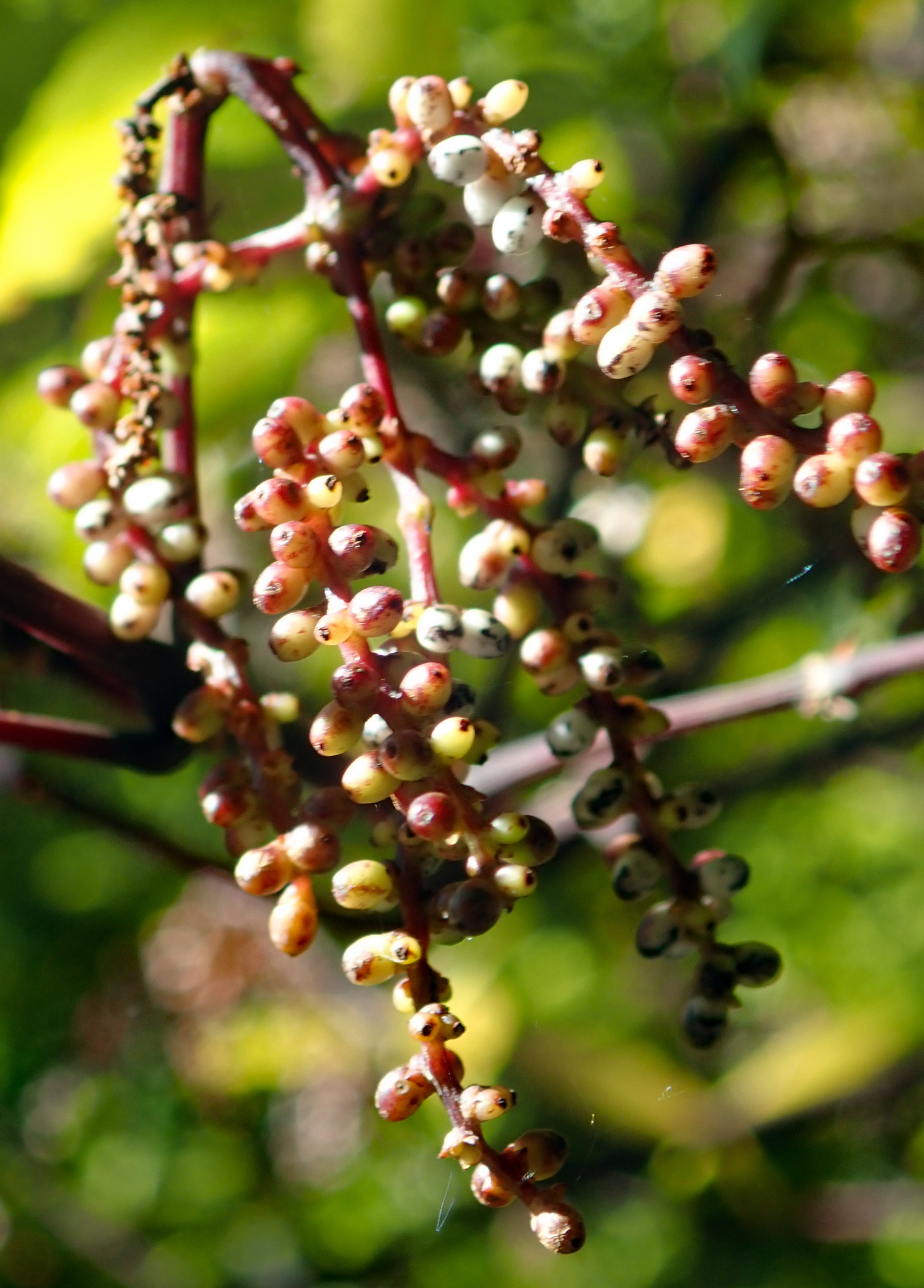
Fruiting spike

Ascarina lucida (hutu) is a species of monoecious shrub or small tree, reaching heights of up to 8 metres (30 feet) with a trunk of up to 300 mm in diameter. Its bark is pale and smooth. The branchlets are slender and dark purple. The wood is reddish-brown, straight-grained, and is noted to be tough and strong. The largest specimens are estimated to have a lifespan of about 130 years.

Its petioles are 8–10 mm long. Its laminae (leaf blades) are coriaceous (leather-like) in character, 20–80 × 15–38 mm long, elliptic to oval to obovate; the surface of the leaves is glossy yellow-green (rarely dark green), and the serrations are dark purple-black or maroon. The bracts are acute in shape. The leaves resemble those of pukatea (Laurelia novae-zelandiae), but can be distinguished by A. lucida having bristles at the bases of the leaves.

Its inflorescences (flower clusters) are found in branched spikes, the branches around 30–40 mm long. The flowers are green or red-tinged and 0.8–1.2 mm long. The male flowers have one cylindrical anther, 2.5–3.0 mm long; the female flowers are smaller. The fruit is a fleshy white drupe, 2.5–3.0 mm long, broadly ovoid, and contains one seed. A. lucida has a diploid chromosome count of 26.

=== Phytochemisty ===
Soltis & Bohm (1982) first investigated the phytochemistry traits of the species and discovered that A. lucida contains various flavanoids, including quercetin and kaempferol. The flavonoid structures are comparable to those of members of three other angiosperm families: Lauraceae, Saururaceae, and Piperaceae; several studies, including Soltis & Bohm (1982), suggested a close relationship between Chloranthaceae and these families.

== Taxonomy ==
Ascarina lucida is the only member of the Chloranthaceae native to New Zealand. The species was first described by the British botanist Joseph Dalton Hooker in 1856. Hooker cited two collections of A. lucida in his publication, the Flora Novae Zelandiae. The New Zealand botanist Thomas Cheeseman mentioned that Joseph Banks and Daniel Solander first obtained specimens in 1770 in the South Island at Queen Charlotte Sound / Tōtaranui.

The genus Ascarina likely diverged around 31 million years ago in the early Oligocene. The species of Ascarina occur principally on the Pacific Islands, except one species found in Madagascar. Zhang et al. (2011), based on plastid DNA analysis, divided Ascarina into two main clades (groups); one lineage consisting of A. solmsiana and A. coursii were assigned to section Madagascarina; the other lineage had not been well-studied, although A. lucida and A. polystachya are considered to be part of a sister group, meaning A. lucida the closest relative is A. polystachya of the Society Islands.

There are two recognised varieties of Ascarina lucida:

- Ascarina lucida var. lucida — endemic to mainland New Zealand
- Ascarina lucida var. lanceolata — endemic to the Kermadec Islands

=== Etymology ===
The genus name Ascarina derives from the Latin ascris, which refers to intestinal roundworms; this refers to the worm-shaped anthers. The specific epithet lucida derives from the Latin lucidus, 'shining', and refers to the shiny leaf surface. The species is commonly known as hutu, which comes from the Māori language.

== Ecology ==
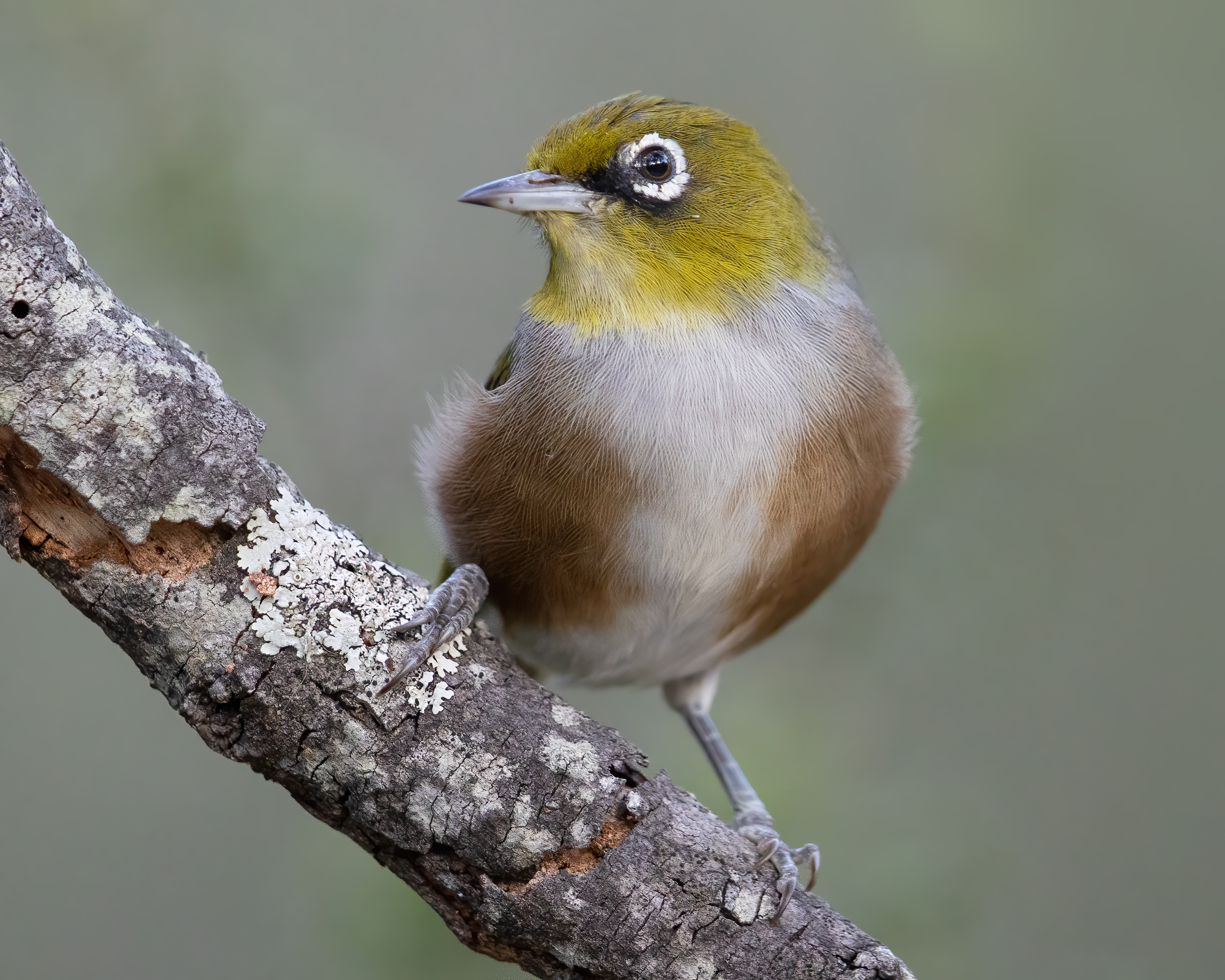
The native silvereye bird consumes the fruits of A. lucida.

The fruit are dispersed by fruit-eating animals (frugivores), such as birds. Burrows (1996) recorded that A. lucida fruit were consumed in abundance by silvereyes (Zosterops lateralis). Other birds known to eat the fruits include fantails (Rhipidura fuliginosa) and New Zealand bellbirds (Anthornis melanura). A. lucida is wind-pollinated, with no evidence of insect pollination, though the non-native honeybee (Apis mellifera) is recorded visiting the plant.

Moore (1977) studied the floral structure of A. lucida, which was further investigated by Garnock-Jones et al. (2025). A. lucida is confirmed to be monoecious, with male and female flower structures found on the same plant. It was previously thought to be dioecious, with individual trees either male or female.

The environmental tolerance of Ascarina lucida to different climates was experimentally tested by exposing seedlings to temperature, drought, and waterlogged soil conditions. In a 2005 study, A. lucida seedlings showed tolerance of waterlogged soils, though they experienced significantly reduced root biomass under severe waterlogging. Additionally, exposure to a temperature of −2°C caused the seedlings to die out. It exhibits similar drought tolerance to Coprosma autumnalis, which is known for its drought intolerance. Germination rates depend on their environmental location; the species is well-adapted to colonising disturbed sites. A 2002 study recorded that submontane populations had a germination rate of 76 percent, while seeds from lowland populations had a rate of 32 percent. The polypore fungus, Laetiporus portentosus, is frequently associated with the tree.

== Distribution ==
Ascarina lucida is endemic to New Zealand; its range covers both the North and South Islands. In the North Island, it is rare, and occurs mostly in the western side of the island; recorded populations have been found in the Bay of Islands, Coromandel Peninsula, Kaitaia, Whangārei, and the Wairarapa Region. In the South Island, it is more common; it has been recorded in north-west Nelson, Marlborough, and West Coast Regions, where it is abundant in the western side of the island. It grows as far south as Puysegur Point in Fiordland. A. lucida was common in the early Holocene but has become progressively less common over the past 7,000 years.

=== Habitat ===
Ascarina lucida is typically found in lowland and montane forests. In the South Island, A. lucida does not occur at altitudes above 300 m (980 ft), however, in the North Island it can reach altitudes of 850 m (2,790 ft). In the Auckland Region, it occurs from 20–600 metres (70–2,000 feet) above sea level. A. lucida grows in various soil types and is principally found in podocarp-hardwood forests in sheltered sites. It is often found in areas with an annual rainfall of 1,500 mm or more.

== Conservation ==
The 2023 assessment of Ascarina lucida var. lucida in the New Zealand Threat Classification System was "Not Threatened", while A. l. var. lanceolata was assessed as "At Risk – Naturally Uncommon". A. lucida var. lucida is "Regionally Endangered" in the Auckland Region.

== Works cited ==
=== Books ===
- Cheeseman, T. F. (1906). Manual of the New Zealand flora (1 ed.). Wellington, New Zealand: Government of New Zealand.
- Dawson, John; Lucas, Rob (2011). Field Guide to New Zealand's Native Trees. Nelson, New Zealand: Potton & Burton. ISBN 978-1-877517-01-3.
- Eagle, Audrey (2006). Eagle's Complete Trees and Shrubs of New Zealand. Vol. 1. Wellington, New Zealand: Te Papa Press. ISBN 0-909010-08-0.
- Kirk, Thomas (1889). The Forest Flora of New Zealand. Wellington, New Zealand: Government of New Zealand.
- Vennell, Robert (2023). The Forgotten Forest. Auckland, New Zealand: HarperCollins. ISBN 9781775542193.

=== Journals ===
- Burrows, C. J. (1996). "Germination Behaviour of Seeds of the New Zealand Woody Species Ascarina lucida, Coprosma grandifolia, Melicytus lanceolatus, and Solanum laciniatum". New Zealand Journal of Botany. 34 (4): 509–515. doi:10.1080/0028825X.1996.10410131. ISSN 0028-825X.
- Garnock-Jones, P. J.; Malcolm, S. B.; Jesson, L. K. (2025). "Heterodichogamy in Ascarina lucida (Chloranthaceae)". International Journal of Plant Sciences. 186 (5): 323–331. doi:10.1086/735611. ISSN 1058-5893.
- Martin, T. J. (2002). "Ascarina lucida in the Auckland Region". Auckland Botanical Society. 57: 57–59. Archived from the original on 7 June 2024.
- Martin, Timothy J.; Ogden, John (2002). "The Seed Ecology of Ascarina lucida: A Rare New Zealand Tree Adapted to Disturbance". New Zealand Journal of Botany. 40 (3): 397–404. doi:10.1080/0028825X.2002.9512801. ISSN 0028-825X.
- Martin, Timothy J.; Ogden, John (2005). "Experimental Studies on the Drought, Waterlogging, and Frost Tolerance of Ascarina lucida Hook. f (Chloranthaceae) Seedlings". New Zealand Journal of Ecology. 29 (1). New Zealand Ecological Society: 53–59. ISSN 0110-6465. JSTOR 24056193.
- McGlone, M. S.; Moar, N. T. (1977). "The Ascarina Decline and Post-Glacial Climatic Change in New Zealand". New Zealand Journal of Botany. 15 (2): 485–489. doi:10.1080/0028825X.1977.10432554. ISSN 0028-825X.
- Moore, Lucy B. (1977). "The Flowers of Ascarina lucida Hook. f. (Chloranthaceae)". New Zealand Journal of Botany. 15 (2): 491–494. doi:10.1080/0028825X.1977.10432555. ISSN 0028-825X.
- O'Donnell, Colin F.J.; Dilks, Peter J. (1994). "Foods and Foraging of Forest Birds in Temperate Rainforest, South Westland, New Zealand". New Zealand Journal of Ecology. 18 (2). New Zealand Ecological Society: 87–107. ISSN 0110-6465. JSTOR 24066768.
- Smith, Albert C. (1976). "Studies of Pacific Island Plants, XXXIII. The Genus Ascarina (Chloranthaceae) in the Southern Pacific". Journal of the Arnold Arboretum. 57 (4). Arnold Arboretum of Harvard University: 405–425. ISSN 0004-2625. JSTOR 43781997.
- Soltis, Douglas E.; Bohm, Bruce A. (1982). "Flavonoids of Ascarina lucida". Journal of Natural Products. 45 (4): 415–417. doi:10.1021/np50022a009. ISSN 0163-3864.
- Swamy, B. G. L. (1953). "A Taxonomic Resion of the Genus Ascarina Forst". Proceedings of the National Institute of Sciences of India. 19: 371–388.
- Zhang, Qiang; Antonelli, Alexandre; Feild, Taylor S.; Kong, Hong-Zhi (2011). "Revisiting Taxonomy, Morphological Evolution, and Fossil Calibration Strategies in Chloranthaceae". Journal of Systematics and Evolution. 49 (4): 315–329. doi:10.1111/j.1759-6831.2011.00129.x.

=== Websites ===
- De Lange, Peter (2025). "Ascarina lucida var. lucida". New Zealand Plant Conservation Network. Archived from the original on 5 August 2025.
- "Ascarina lucida Hook.f." Plants of the World Online. Archived from the original on 21 December 2024 – via Royal Botanic Gardens, Kew.
