= Pterophylla affinis =

Conservation status
- Least Concern (IUCN 3.1)

Scientific classification
- Kingdom: Plantae
- Clade: Tracheophytes
- Clade: Angiosperms
- Clade: Eudicots
- Clade: Rosids
- Order: Oxalidales
- Family: Cunoniaceae
- Genus: Pterophylla
- Species: P. affinis

Binomial name
- Pterophylla affinis (A.Gray) Pillon & H.C.Hopkins

Synonyms
- Pterophylla samoensis (A.Gray) Pillon & H.C.Hopkins; Weinmannia affinis A.Gray; Weinmannia manuana Christoph.; Weinmannia rarotongensis Hemsl. ex Cheeseman; Weinmannia samoensis A.Gray; Windmannia affinis (A.Gray) Kuntze; Windmannia samoensis (A.Gray) Kuntze

Species of flowering plant

Pterophylla affinis, formerly known as Weinmannia affinis, is a species of flowering plant in the family Cunoniaceae. It is native to Fiji, the Samoan Islands, and Rarotonga in the Cook Islands.

In Fiji it is known from the islands of Viti Levu, Ovalau, and Taveuni, where it grows in tropical dry forest from 350 to 1,323 metres elevation.

In the Samoan islands, Pterophylla affinis is a common canopy tree in montane forests on lower mountain slopes, and in cloud forests above 650 metres elevation. It also grows on rocky upland lava flows.

It also grows in Rarotonga's Metrosideros cloud forest, on cloud-shrouded peaks and ridges above 400 metres elevation. Pterophylla affinis is part of a low forest canopy which averages eight meters high, dominated by Metrosideros collina.
