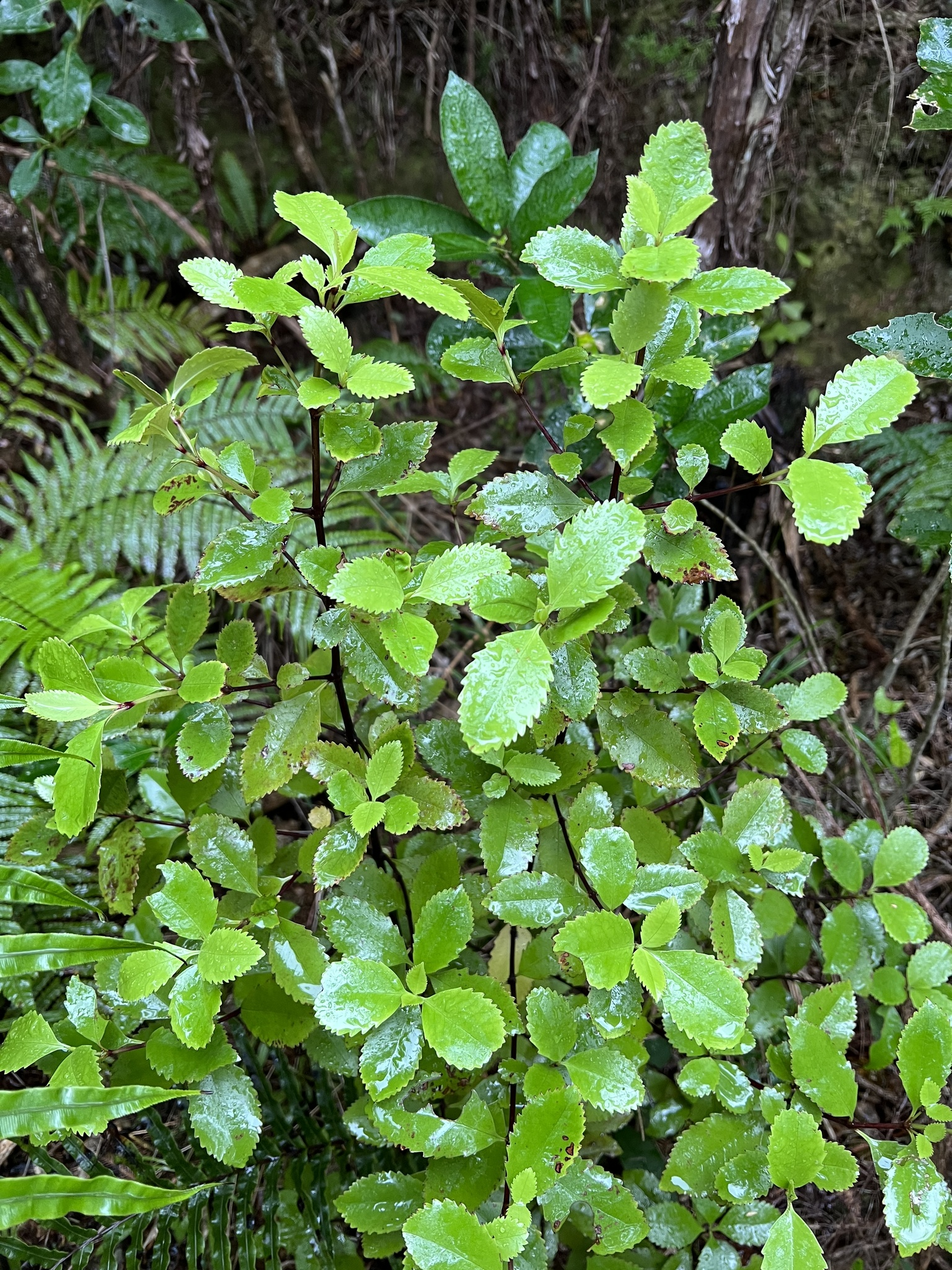
- Ascarina lucida

Scientific classification
- Kingdom: Plantae
- Clade: Embryophytes
- Clade: Tracheophytes
- Clade: Angiosperms
- Order: Chloranthales
- Family: Chloranthaceae
- Genus: Ascarina; J.R.Forst. & G.Forst. (1776)

Species
- Ascarina coursii (Humbert & Capuron) J.-F.Leroy & Jérémie; Ascarina diffusa A.C.Sm.; Ascarina lucida Hook.f.; Ascarina maheshwarii Swamy; Ascarina marquesensis A.C.Sm.; Ascarina philippinensis C.B.Rob.; Ascarina polystachya J.R.Forst. & G.Forst.; Ascarina rubricaulis Solms; Ascarina solmsiana Schltr.; Ascarina subfalcata J.W.Moore; Ascarina subsessilis Verdc.; Ascarina swamyana A.C.Sm.

Synonyms
- Ascarinopsis Humbert & Capuron (1955)

= Ascarina =

Genus of flowering plants

Ascarina is an ancient, woody, angiosperm genus. It is a distinct genus of the family Chloranthaceae, consisting of less than twenty species, found in the Australian region, the Pacific Islands and Madagascar. They can grow up to six metres tall and have a spread of approximately three metres. Ascarina are usually tropical cloud forest species which need high humidity to thrive, and are vulnerable to both frost and drought. There has been discussion and research on whether or not this genus and its family are primitive, or have become reduced over time. Another controversial topic for the genus is its relation to the Clavatipollenites, a fossilized pollen.

== Morphology ==
Ascarina plants are divided into three major species groups, based on the number of stamens per male flower, number of supporting flower bracts and geographic location. The flowers of the Ascarina species are unisexual, containing one to five stamens in male flowers, and a single carpel in females. The exception to this is A. lucida, which can have monoecious flowers. Ascarina plants differ from the other members of the Chloranthaceae family in that male flowers can have more than one stamen, indicative of a reduction from a more advanced form. Ascarina flowers are anemophilous, meaning they pollinate by wind rather than by symbiosis with insects. That trait is an indication of the primitive nature of the plant.

Ascarina trees produce elliptic leaves with varying size and vascular structures. The leaf margins are lightly serrated, and the petiole of the leaf is quite short. These leaves also have the highest vein order of four to five, in a combination of brochidodromous (where secondary veins do not terminate at leaf margin, and instead form joined arches along the margin) and craspedodomous (where secondary veins terminate at leaf margins) venations. The structures on leaf margins of Ascarina share general shape, size and with the other genera of Chloranthaceae. They differ from the other genera in the festooned craspedodomous venation, which is a unique feature of Ascarina.

The pollen of Ascarina plants are a wind distributed pollen with some notable differences from the rest of the genera. It is mostly monosulcate, with some trichotomosulcate variants. The pollen have a net like or reticulate sculpturing with columellar structures. The mori have distinct features which could be either microverrae or supratectal spinules which is a trait shared with Hedyosmum.

== Ecology ==
Most Ascarina are endemic to high humidity montane forests (1000–3300 m elevation), with an exception of A. lucida (0–1500 m elevation). The plants grow best in sunny disturbed regions, a trait shared with its sister genus Hedyosmum, but not with the other two genera of Chloranthaceae. The sole exception to this amongst the genus is A. swamyana, which grows best in shady regions. Ascarina and Hedyosmum were among the first angiosperms to recruit seedlings in brighter areas, and this ability to grow in open areas has been proposed as the explanation for Ascarina being anemophilous.

The Chloranthaceae were one of the most widespread of the basal angiosperm groups, and as such Ascarina was very widespread in the mid Eocene and the early Pleistocene epochs. Fossil records show Ascarina pollen to be much more widespread during those time periods than it is currently, due to a more suitable climate and fewer competitors. This wide spread of the genus likely explains its presence on Madagascar as a species of Ascarina developed on the African continent was carried by wind to Madagascar, where environmental conditions were favorable to its continuing survival.

The present day range of Ascinara is much less than what it used to be, as a result of both climatic changes and increased competition. In New Zealand in particular, the range of A. lucida has decreased. This is not a result of a pollen limitation, as Ascarina produces enough pollen to spread far beyond its habitable range, and even cross water to islands near New Zealand, but rather its vulnerability to both drought and frost. A. lucida grew reliably in regions of approximately 1500mm rainfall, and abundantly in areas of approximately 2500mm rainfall. In addition, a light frost would cause severe damage to leaves and flower buds. This vulnerability to climate change limits the range in which Ascarina can grow.

== Species ==
12 species are currently recognized:

- Ascarina coursii (Humbert & Capuron) J.-F.Leroy & Jérémie – Madagascar
- Ascarina diffusa A.C.Sm. – Bismarck Archipelago, Solomon Islands, Vanuatu, Fiji, Samoan Islands, and Cook Islands
- Ascarina lucida Hook.f. – New Zealand
- Ascarina maheshwarii Swamy – Eastern New Guinea, Bismarck Archipelago, and Solomon Islands
- Ascarina marquesensis A.C.Sm. – Marquesas Islands
- Ascarina philippinensis C.B.Rob. – Borneo, Philippines, Sulawesi, New Guinea, and Bismarck Archipelago
- Ascarina polystachya J.R.Forst. & G.Forst. – Society Islands
- Ascarina rubricaulis Solms – New Caledonia
- Ascarina solmsiana Schltr. – northwestern New Caledonia
- Ascarina subfalcata J.W.Moore – Society Islands (Raiatea and Tahiti)
- Ascarina subsessilis Verdc. – Papua New Guinea
- Ascarina swamyana A.C.Sm. – Fiji and Vanuatu

== Research ==
=== Flower morphology and reduction ===
The main point of contention in research of Ascarina lies in the primitive nature of the flower. Ascarina flowers are naked and unisexual with one carpel in females, and between one and five in males. The male flowers have a morphology that suggests that they have been reduced from a more evolved form, rather than simply retaining more primitive features.

There are several pieces of evidence that indicate the reduction of the Ascarina genera. The main evidence stems from the fact that Ascarina is the sole genus of Chloranthaceae which has flowers that can contain more than one stamen. Another feature indicative of reduction lies with the bisexual flowers which some Ascarina species produce. However, it is still uncertain whether these unique morphologies are the result of a secondary evolution, or were inherited from a lost ancestor.

=== Clavatipollenites hughesii ===
There has been some debate and controversy regarding the fossil record of Ascarina pollen, due to the presence of Clavatipollenites hughesii. The Clavatipollenites hughesii are a pollen fossil group which has been compared to Ascarina pollen since being discovered. The Clavatipollenites hughesii share the same pollen features as Ascarina and Hedyosmum. Most importantly, these pollen types date back to the early mid Cretaceous epoch, before the time in which Chloranthaceae were abundant.

The similarities between Clavatipollenites hughesii and Ascarina pollen are manifold. There is similarity in the pollen shape, with both being monosulcate and with reticulate columnar structure. In addition to this, the Clavatipollenites hughesii share the less common features of Ascarina pollen, such as spinules on the mori, which some believe is evidence of a direct link between the species of plants. The shared traits between the two pollen types are not direct proof, as clear differences can be found amongst other pollen types studied under SEM. Therefore, the exact nature of the similarities remains unknown.
