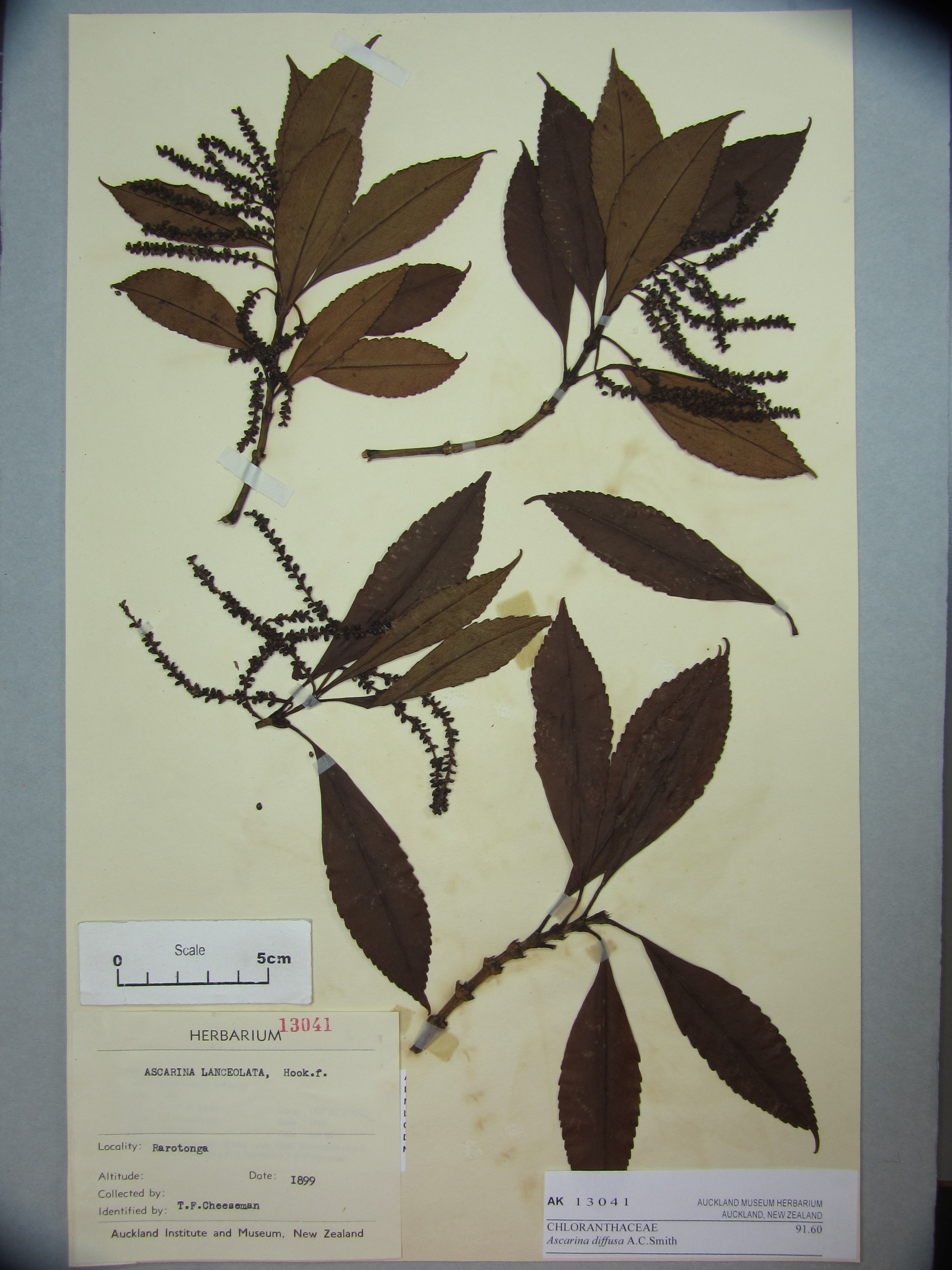

Scientific classification
- Kingdom: Plantae
- Clade: Tracheophytes
- Clade: Angiosperms
- Order: Chloranthales
- Family: Chloranthaceae
- Genus: Ascarina
- Species: A. diffusa

Binomial name
- Ascarina diffusa A.C.Sm. (1976)

= Ascarina diffusa =

Species of flowering plant

Ascarina diffusa, known as Maire Rākau in Cook Islands Māori, is a species of flowering plant in the family Chloranthaceae. It is native to the tropical Pacific, ranging from the Bismarck Archipelago through the Solomon Islands, Vanuatu, Fiji, and the Samoan Islands to the Cook Islands.

It is a small shrub with glossy, oval leaves and small white flowers.

On Rarotonga in the Cook Islands, Ascarina diffusa is a characteristic tree of cloud forests above 400 meters elevation, becoming dominant or co-dominant with Metrosideros collina in higher and wetter cloud forest areas.
