= Homalium betulifolium =

Conservation status
- Near Threatened (IUCN 3.1)

Scientific classification
- Kingdom: Plantae
- Clade: Embryophytes
- Clade: Tracheophytes
- Clade: Spermatophytes
- Clade: Angiosperms
- Clade: Eudicots
- Clade: Rosids
- Order: Malpighiales
- Family: Salicaceae
- Genus: Homalium
- Species: H. betulifolium

Binomial name
- Homalium betulifolium Daniker

Species of flowering plant

Homalium betulifolium is a species of plant in the family Salicaceae. It is endemic to New Caledonia.
