= Homalium jainii =

Conservation status
- Endangered (IUCN 2.3)

Scientific classification
- Kingdom: Plantae
- Clade: Tracheophytes
- Clade: Angiosperms
- Clade: Eudicots
- Clade: Rosids
- Order: Malpighiales
- Family: Salicaceae
- Genus: Homalium
- Species: H. jainii

Binomial name
- Homalium jainii Henry & Samin.

Species of flowering plant

Homalium jainii is a species of plant in the family Salicaceae. It is endemic to Tamil Nadu in India. It can grow up to 30 meters tall and has grey bark. The flowers are around 10-12 millimeters across, and are bisexual, meaning they have both male and female parts.
