= Homalium rubiginosum =

Conservation status
- Endangered (IUCN 3.1)

Scientific classification
- Kingdom: Plantae
- Clade: Tracheophytes
- Clade: Angiosperms
- Clade: Eudicots
- Clade: Rosids
- Order: Malpighiales
- Family: Salicaceae
- Genus: Homalium
- Species: H. rubiginosum

Binomial name
- Homalium rubiginosum (Vieill.) Warb.

Species of flowering plant

Homalium rubiginosum is a species of plant in the family Salicaceae. It is endemic to New Caledonia.
