= Homalium gracilipes =

Conservation status
- Vulnerable (IUCN 3.1)

Scientific classification
- Kingdom: Plantae
- Clade: Tracheophytes
- Clade: Angiosperms
- Clade: Eudicots
- Clade: Rosids
- Order: Malpighiales
- Family: Salicaceae
- Genus: Homalium
- Species: H. gracilipes

Binomial name
- Homalium gracilipes Sleumer

Species of flowering plant

Homalium gracilipes is a species of plant in the family Salicaceae. It is endemic to Tanzania.
