= Homalium spathulatum =

Conservation status
- Endangered (IUCN 2.3)

Scientific classification
- Kingdom: Plantae
- Clade: Tracheophytes
- Clade: Angiosperms
- Clade: Eudicots
- Clade: Rosids
- Order: Malpighiales
- Family: Salicaceae
- Genus: Homalium
- Species: H. spathulatum

Binomial name
- Homalium spathulatum Ridl.

Species of tree

Homalium spathulatum is a species of plant in the family Salicaceae. It is a tree endemic to Peninsular Malaysia. It is threatened by habitat loss.
