= Homalium hypolasium =

Conservation status
- Endangered (IUCN 3.1)

Scientific classification
- Kingdom: Plantae
- Clade: Embryophytes
- Clade: Tracheophytes
- Clade: Angiosperms
- Clade: Eudicots
- Clade: Rosids
- Order: Malpighiales
- Family: Salicaceae
- Genus: Homalium
- Species: H. hypolasium

Binomial name
- Homalium hypolasium Mildbr.

Species of flowering plant

Homalium hypolasium is a species of flowering plant in the family Salicaceae. It is native to southern Cameroon and mainland Equatorial Guinea. Its natural habitat is lowland and submontane evergreen forest, up to 1,100 metres elevation. It is threatened by habitat loss.
