= Homalium brevidens =

Scientific classification
- Kingdom: Plantae
- Clade: Tracheophytes
- Clade: Angiosperms
- Clade: Eudicots
- Clade: Rosids
- Order: Malpighiales
- Family: Salicaceae
- Genus: Homalium
- Species: H. brevidens

Binomial name
- Homalium brevidens Gagnep., Notul. Syst. (Paris) 3: 247 (1916)

Species of flowering plant

Homalium brevidens is a shrub or tree species in the family Salicaceae, found in Laos and Cambodia.

It grows 2-6m tall, with simple broad leaves, and is found in flooded forests in Cambodia. These forests, also known as swamp forests, is a community where the trees are usually 7-15(-20)m tall, that occurs along the shores of the lake Tonle Sap and nearby rivers, and is flooded to a maximum of 4-6m of water for up to 8 months per year. The 2 main species of tree in these forests are Barringtonia acutangula and Diospyros cambodiana, with H. brevidens one of the other common tree species. On islands of the Mekong, in Steung Treng and Kratie provinces, north-central Cambodia, the tree occurs with medium abundance in the Riverine Strand vegetation zone (last to be flooded, first to be exposed). Here it contributes to a closed canopy, growing above metamorphic sandstone bedrock at an elevation of 25-30m above sea level. On these islands it flowers from June to July, and fruits from September to October.

The plant is known as rotèang or stiëw in Khmer. Wood from the shrub is used to make charcoal, its bark is used to caulk boats.
