= Homalium dalzielii =

Conservation status
- Vulnerable (IUCN 2.3)

Scientific classification
- Kingdom: Plantae
- Clade: Tracheophytes
- Clade: Angiosperms
- Clade: Eudicots
- Clade: Rosids
- Order: Malpighiales
- Family: Salicaceae
- Genus: Homalium
- Species: H. dalzielii

Binomial name
- Homalium dalzielii Hutch.

Species of flowering plant

Homalium dalzielii is a species of plant in the family Salicaceae. It is found in Benin, Nigeria, and Cameroon. It can grow up to 40 feet high.
