= Homalium racemosum =

Conservation status
- Least Concern (IUCN 3.1)

Scientific classification
- Kingdom: Plantae
- Clade: Tracheophytes
- Clade: Angiosperms
- Clade: Eudicots
- Clade: Rosids
- Order: Malpighiales
- Family: Salicaceae
- Genus: Homalium
- Species: H. racemosum

Binomial name
- Homalium racemosum Jacq.

Synonyms
- List: Homalium anzoateguiense Steyerm. Homalium columbianum S.F.Blake; Homalium cuneifolium Willd. ex Eichler Homalium eleutherostylum S.F.Blake; Homalium eurypetalum S.F.Blake Homalium hemistylum S.F.Blake; Homalium hondurense Donn.Sm. Homalium integrifolium Britton, nom. illeg. homonym. post.; Homalium leiogynum S.F.Blake Homalium mituense Cuatrec.; Homalium nicaraguense S.F.Blake Homalium obtusatum Turcz.; Homalium pedicellatum Spruce ex Benth. Homalium pittieri S.F.Blake; Homalium pleiandrum S.F.Blake Homalium racemosum subsp. barbellatum S.F.Blake; Homalium riparium Standl. Homalium schippii Standl.; Homalium stenosepalum S.F.Blake Homalium trichocladum S.F.Blake

Species of plant

Homalium racemosum, the white cogwood, is a tree in the willow family (Salicaceae). Its native habitat ranges from central to northern South America and Central America up to southern Mexico and the Caribbean. They are found in dry forests, seasonal evergreen forests, and rainforests.

== Taxonomy ==
Homalium racemosum was first described in 1760 by Nikolaus Joseph von Jacquin in his book Enumeratio Systematica Plantarum. In 1763, he provided an extended description with a figure of the flower in Selectarum Stirpium Americanarum Historia.

It was previously classified in the family Flacourtiaceae which is now defunct. After Chase et al. (2002) provided genetic evidence that Flacourtiaceae were polyphyletic, Homalium were reclassified as Salicaceae.

== Description ==
Homalium racemosum grows as an evergreen tree, reaching a height of 20–30 m (65–98 ft). The trunk has a diameter of up to 90 cm (3 ft). The bark is grey and smooth, and becomes slightly fissured to scaly with age.

Leaves are alternate, short-stalked, and serrate. They are papery to slightly leathery, 5–15 cm long and 6 cm wide; often glabrous, though sometimes slightly hairy along the veins; ovate to obovate or elliptic in shape; and rounded, acute, acuminate, or mucronate at the apex. Glands are present on the underside at the crenations or serrations. The stipules are deciduous.

Flower clusters are short and form at the tips of shoots or in the leaf axils. The flowers are bisexual. They are small, short-stalked, and fragrant. They possess a double perianth and are greenish-white. 5–7 similarly colored petals and sepals rise from the floral cup; they alternate in size, with the sepals being smaller and the petals larger (5–6 mm long) and hairy on both surfaces. Multiple stamens are positioned opposite the petals in groups of roughly 3–6. The ovary is semi-inferior, unilocular, and conical at the apex; it bears 3 or 4 short, subulate styles that are fused at the base and tipped with tiny stigmas. Prominent, hairy nectar glands are present.

Within the flower, indehiscent and capsule-like fruit are formed. These fruit are approximately 5 mm in size. They are one- to two-seeded. The seeds within the hairy fruit chamber are ellipsoid/oblong. Sterile seeds may also be present.

== Use ==
The heavy and durable wood is put to a wide variety of uses, including furniture-making and house-building. The plant also has been used in traditional medicine. For instance, the Tiriyó people of Suriname use a decoction (made from the leaves) as a wash for treating fevers. The plant's roots are an astringent. In French Guiana in the 18th century, a decoction (made from the roots) was drunk to treat gonorrhoea.

== Common names ==
Common names for Homalium racemosum vary regionally and linguistically, and include (but are not limited to) the following:

- acomat, acomat blanc (Dominica)
- akoma, acomat-hêtre (Guadeloupe)
- bita-oedoe (The Guianas)
- caracolillo, caracolí (Puerto Rico)
- corazon de paloma (Dominican Republic)
- mahot piment (Dominica)
- tostado (Puerto Rico)
