= Homalium dasyanthum =

Scientific classification
- Kingdom: Plantae
- Clade: Tracheophytes
- Clade: Angiosperms
- Clade: Eudicots
- Clade: Rosids
- Order: Malpighiales
- Family: Salicaceae
- Genus: Homalium
- Species: H. dasyanthum

Binomial name
- Homalium dasyanthum (Turcz.) W.Theob., Burmah [Mason], ed. 3. 2: 451 (1883)

Synonyms
- Blakwellia dasyantha Turcz.; Homalium dasyanthum (Turcz.) Warb.; Homalium griffithianum Kurz

Species of flowering plant

Homalium dasyanthum is a tree or shrub in the family Salicaceae. It is found in Peninsular Malaysia, Thailand, Vietnam, Cambodia and Myanmar.

== Description ==
The tree grows usually 4 to 12m high, but specimens have been found up to 30m tall. The trunk can measure 10–20 cm in diameter (exceptionally up to 70 cm), with thin, smooth to rugose bark that slips off in bands, the young parts are softly tawny-pubescent. The leaves are 5–12 by 3–5.5 cm, ovate- or obovate-oblong in shape. Flowers are greenish-yellow or white, in groups of 10–12.

== Ecology and habitat ==
The plant is found mainly in evergreen and mixed deciduous forest in Thailand, but also in limestone hills, often along streams, at low elevations close to the coast. On the border of Chana and Namom districts, Songkhla Province, southern Thailand, there is a granite inselberg locally known as the hill Khao Reng. H. dasyanthum grows here amongst the clefts and on the rock platform fringes (between the surrounding dry evergreen forest and the hill). In Cambodia, it is found in swampy forest and on calcareous rocks, up to 800m elevation

== Uses ==
The wood produces very good charcoal, and is also used in temporary constructions. It is used in Vietnamese traditional medicine.

== Common names ==
In Thailand the tree is known as pha uek, and khaok kwang. Cha ran hoa nham is a name for the plant in Vietnamese traditional medicine. Stiëw tük is a name given in Khmer.
