= Homalium undulatum =

Conservation status
- Vulnerable (IUCN 2.3)

Scientific classification
- Kingdom: Plantae
- Clade: Tracheophytes
- Clade: Angiosperms
- Clade: Eudicots
- Clade: Rosids
- Order: Malpighiales
- Family: Salicaceae
- Genus: Homalium
- Species: H. undulatum

Binomial name
- Homalium undulatum King

Synonyms
- Homalium verruculosum Craib

Species of tree

Homalium undulatum is a species of flowering plant in the family Salicaceae. It is a tree found in Peninsular Malaysia. It is threatened by habitat loss.
