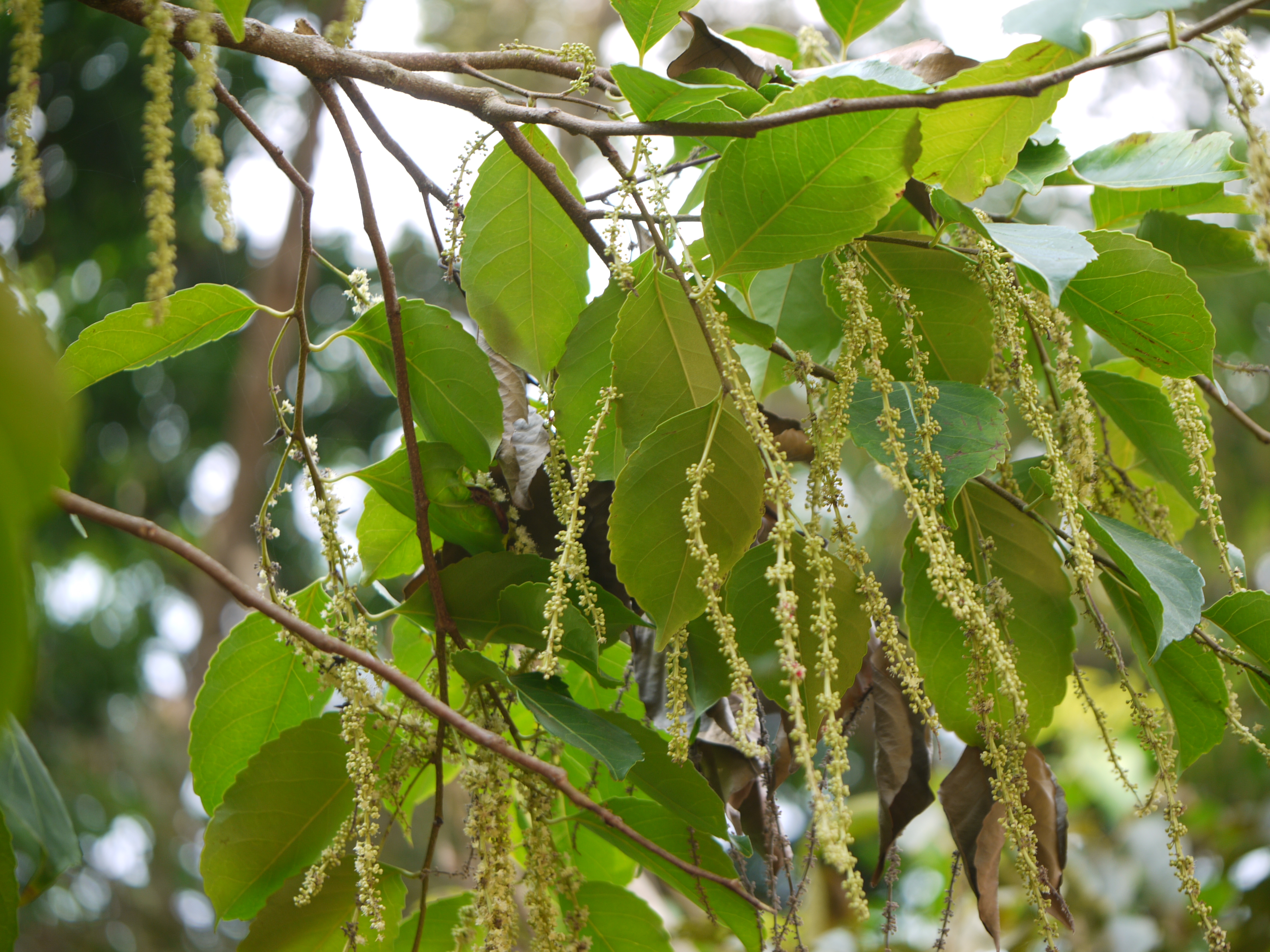
- Homalium ceylanicum

Scientific classification
- Kingdom: Plantae
- Clade: Tracheophytes
- Clade: Angiosperms
- Clade: Eudicots
- Clade: Rosids
- Order: Malpighiales
- Family: Salicaceae
- Subfamily: Salicoideae
- Tribe: Homalieae
- Genus: Homalium; Jacq.

Species
- See text

Synonyms
- Antinisa (Tul.) Hutch.; Nisa Noronha ex Thouars; Pierrea Hance

= Homalium =

Genus of flowering plants

Homalium is a genus of plants in the family Salicaceae.

== Species ==
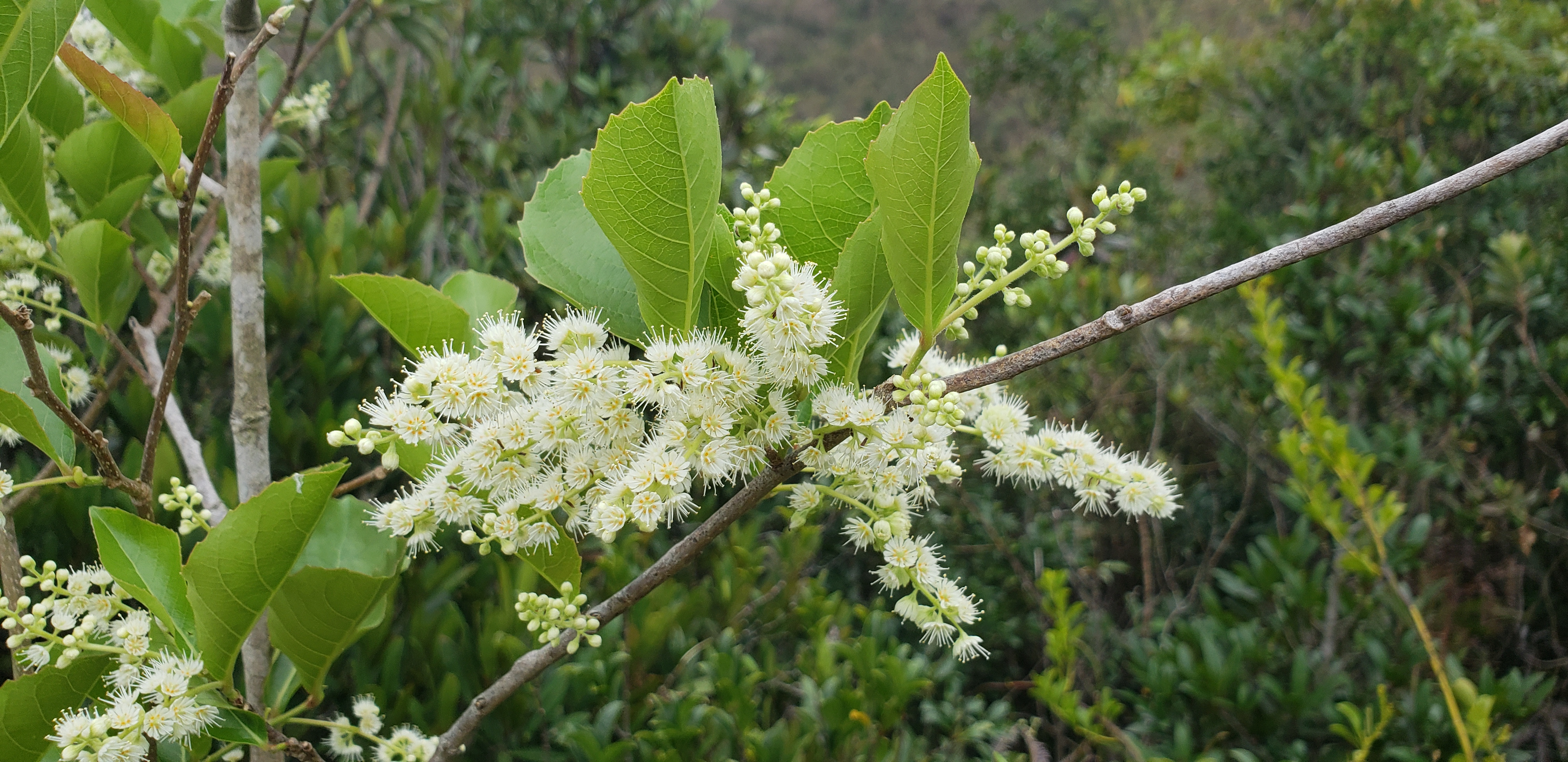
Homalium cochinchinense

Species include:

- Homalium acuminatum Cheeseman
- Homalium betulifolium Daniker
- Homalium brevidens Gagnep.
- Homalium buxifolium Daniker
- Homalium ceylanicum (Gardner) Benth.
- Homalium cochinchinense Lour. Druce
- Homalium dalzielii Hutch.
- Homalium dasyanthum (Turcz.) W.Theob.
- Homalium foetidum (Roxb.) Benth.
- Homalium gracilipes Sleumer
- Homalium henriquesii Gilg ex Engl.
- Homalium hypolasium Mildbr.
- Homalium jainii Henry & Samin.
- Homalium juxtapositum Sleumer
- Homalium kunstleri King
- Homalium longifolium Benth.
- Homalium mathieuanum (Vieill.) Briq.
- Homalium moto H. Saint John
- Homalium mouo H. Saint John
- Homalium nepalense Benth.
- Homalium ogoouense Pellegrin
- Homalium pallidum A.C.Sm.
- Homalium paniculatum (Lam.) Benth.
- Homalium patoklaense Aubrev. & Pellegrin
- Homalium polystachyum (Vieill.) Briq.
- Homalium racemosum Jacq.
- Homalium rubiginosum (Vieill.) Warb.
- Homalium rubrocostatum Sleumer
- Homalium rufescens Benth.
- Homalium sleumerianum Lescot
- Homalium smythei Hutch. & Dalz.
- Homalium spathulatum Ridley
- Homalium taypau St. John
- Homalium tomentosum (Vent.) Benth.
- Homalium travancoricum Beddome
- Homalium undulatum King
