= Homalium longifolium =

Conservation status
- Least Concern (IUCN 2.3)

Scientific classification
- Kingdom: Plantae
- Clade: Tracheophytes
- Clade: Angiosperms
- Clade: Eudicots
- Clade: Rosids
- Order: Malpighiales
- Family: Salicaceae
- Genus: Homalium
- Species: H. longifolium

Binomial name
- Homalium longifolium Benth.

Species of flowering plant

Homalium longifolium (locally known as petaling gajah) is a species of plant in the family Salicaceae. It is found in Malaysia and Thailand.
