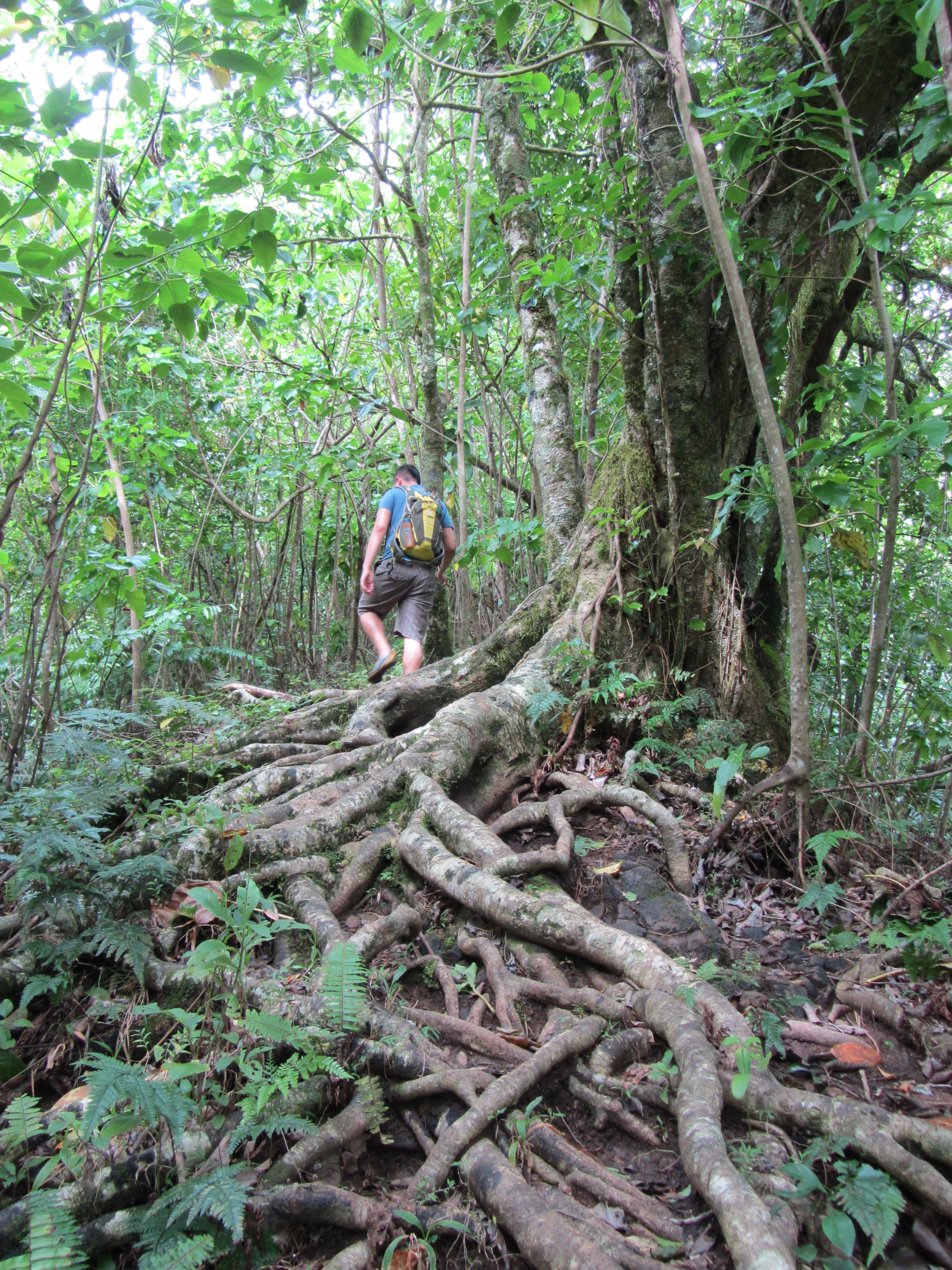

Conservation status
- Least Concern (IUCN 3.1)

Scientific classification
- Kingdom: Plantae
- Clade: Tracheophytes
- Clade: Angiosperms
- Clade: Eudicots
- Clade: Rosids
- Order: Malpighiales
- Family: Salicaceae
- Genus: Homalium
- Species: H. acuminatum

Binomial name
- Homalium acuminatum Cheeseman, 1903

= Homalium acuminatum =

Species of flowering plant

Homalium acuminatum, the Cook Islands homalium, is a species of tree in the willow family, Salicaceae. It is endemic to the Cook Islands, growing on the islands of Rarotonga, where it is known as mato, and Mangaia, where it is known as moto. It grows to a height of up to 20 m (66 ft). On Rarotonga it dominates steep mountain slopes. The IUCN Red List calls it the Rarotonga homalium and considers it endemic to Rarotonga, though the Cook Islands Biodiversity Database lists it as also present, but "uncommon" on Mangaia.
