= Homalium taypau =

Conservation status
- Critically Endangered (IUCN 3.1)

Scientific classification
- Kingdom: Plantae
- Clade: Tracheophytes
- Clade: Angiosperms
- Clade: Eudicots
- Clade: Rosids
- Order: Malpighiales
- Family: Salicaceae
- Genus: Homalium
- Species: H. taypau

Binomial name
- Homalium taypau H.St.John

Species of plant

Homalium taypau, or simply Taypau, is a species of plant in the family Salicaceae. It is endemic to Pitcairn Island, and is as of 2026 critically endangered, being restricted to a single location on the island.

== Taxonomy ==
Homalium taypau was first described by Harold St. John in the 1977 edition of Mitteilungen der Deutschen Dendrologischen Gesellschaft; Homalium then still being considered a member of the family Flacourtiaceae, being moved Salicaceae as the result of a 2002 study led to the former family becoming defunct.

== Distribution and conservation ==
Homalium taypau is endemic to Pitcairn Island, and is not known to have been transplanted anywhere else. It is restricted to the hillsides and valleys of the volcanic interior of the island.

The species was classed as vulnerable due to habitat loss and invasive species in its 1998 IUCN Red List assessment, (Note: Which was carried out under the old IUCN 2.3 system.) in which it was estimated that there were 2,000 extant mature individuals.

Between 2003 and 2006, only one tree with seed was found, and the mature individuals were estimated to number at 150 to 250. In 2022, 23 individuals were seen flowering. As a result of this, and its natural range having become restricted to a single location in the southern part of the island, a 4 km^{2} (1.5 sq mi) area between McCoys Valley Road and Outer Valley Road, the species was deemed critically endangered in its 2023 IUCN Red List assessment. Further individuals were located, but these were found in places thought to be previously managed for timber – the tree in the past frequently being cut for use in construction work – and therefore to not constitute natural populations.

Attempts at planting Homalium taypau specimens in situ have been undertaken as part of conservation efforts.
