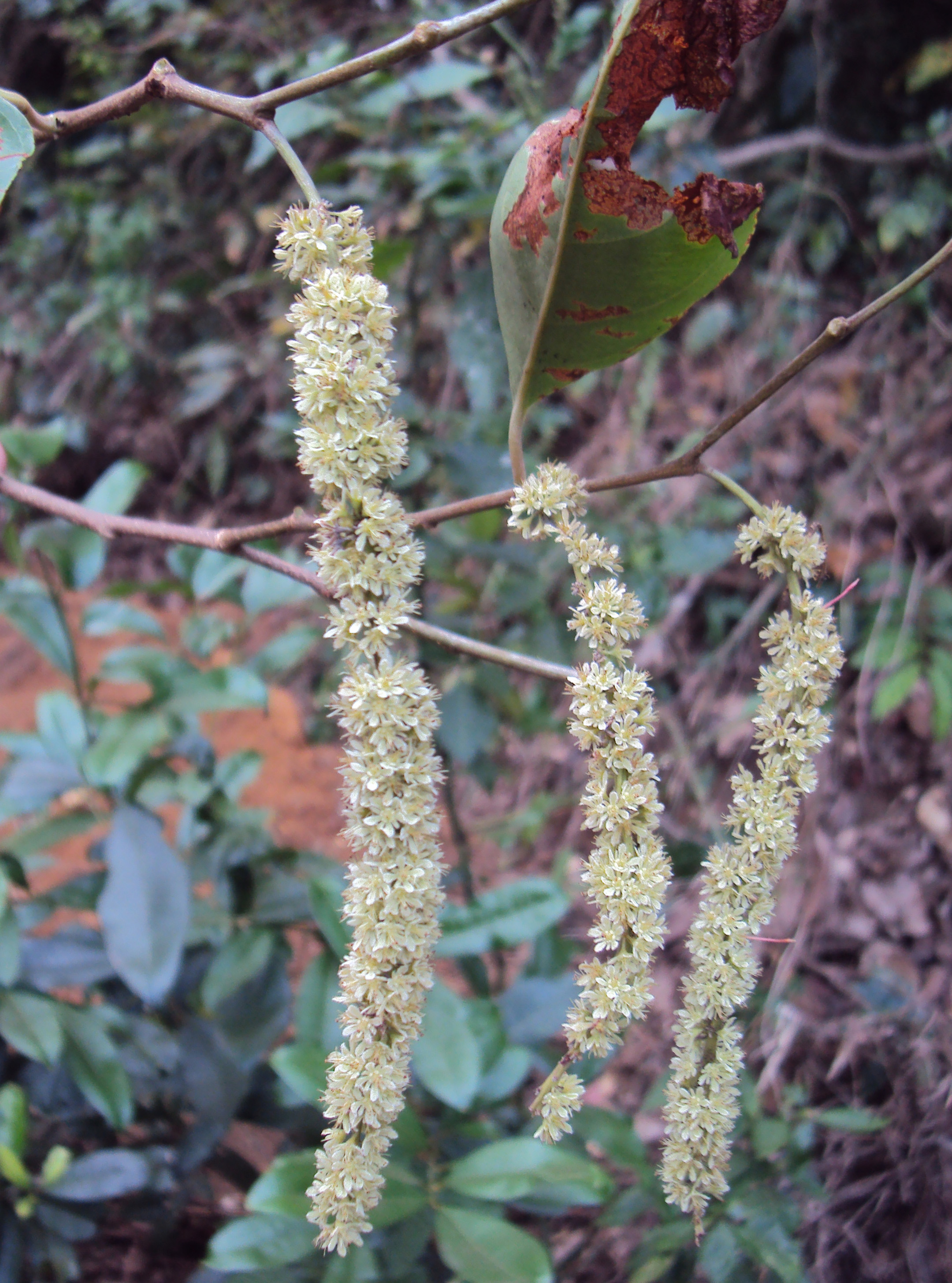
- Flowers of Homalium ceylanicum

Conservation status
- Least Concern (IUCN 3.1)

Scientific classification
- Kingdom: Plantae
- Clade: Tracheophytes
- Clade: Angiosperms
- Clade: Eudicots
- Clade: Rosids
- Order: Malpighiales
- Family: Salicaceae
- Genus: Homalium
- Species: H. ceylanicum

Binomial name
- Homalium ceylanicum (Gardner) Benth.

Synonyms
- Synonymy: Blackwellia ceylanica Gardner; Blakwellia tetrandra Wight; Homalium balansae Gagnep; Homalium bhamoense Cubitt & W.W. Sm.; Homalium bhamoense var. debbarmanii P.C.Kanjilal; Homalium bhamoense f. glabra P.C.Kanjilal; Homalium ceylanicum var. debbarmanii (P.C.Kanjilal) H.B.Naithani & S.Biswas; Homalium ceylanicum var. laoticum (Gagnep.) G.S. Fan; Homalium ceylanicum subsp. minutiflorum (Kurz) R.L.Mitra; Homalium ciliatum Debb., nom. subnud.; Homalium ciliatum Debb. ex N.Mukh.; Homalium crenulatum E.T.Geddes; Homalium hainanense Gagnep.; Homalium laoticum Gagnep.; Homalium laoticum var. glabratum C.Y. Wu

= Homalium ceylanicum =

Species of flowering plant

Homalium ceylanicum is a species of flowering plant in the family Salicaceae. It is a tree native to the Indian subcontinent, Indochina, and southern China. It grows up to 30 metres tall and has buttressed roots. It grows in tropical dry forests, moist deciduous forests, and moist evergreen rain forests, including forest margins, from 400 to 1,200 metres elevation.

It is cultivated as an ornamental tree and for its wood, which can be used commercially.
