= Ascarina philippinensis =

Conservation status
- Least Concern (IUCN 3.1)

Scientific classification
- Kingdom: Plantae
- Clade: Tracheophytes
- Clade: Angiosperms
- Order: Chloranthales
- Family: Chloranthaceae
- Genus: Ascarina
- Species: A. philippinensis

Binomial name
- Ascarina philippinensis C.B.Rob.

Species of flowering plant

Ascarina philippinensis is a species of small tree in the family Chloranthaceae. It is found in the Philippines, Sulawesi, Borneo, and New Guinea.

Ascarina philippinensis is most commonly found in the months of July, August, and April. Over 50% of the time, it was found in Papua New Guinea.

== Description ==
The tree can grow up to 24 meters high. It has no buttresses, spines, stilt roots, and aerial roots. The bark is brownish gray or brown. The under bark is pale orange. The leaves are opposite. The leaves' lower surface green, upper surface dark green. Hairs are absent on the tree and leaves. The flowers are unisexual, with male and female flowers on different plants. The fleshy fruits are almost black or purple.
