= Homalium mouo =

Conservation status
- Least Concern (IUCN 2.3)

Scientific classification
- Kingdom: Plantae
- Clade: Tracheophytes
- Clade: Angiosperms
- Clade: Eudicots
- Clade: Rosids
- Order: Malpighiales
- Family: Salicaceae
- Genus: Homalium
- Species: H. mouo

Binomial name
- Homalium mouo H.St.John (1977)

Species of flowering plant

Homalium mouo is a species of plant in the family Salicaceae. It is a tree endemic to the island of Makatea in the Tuamotu Archipelago of French Polynesia.
