= Teraupo'o =

Tahitian resistance leader

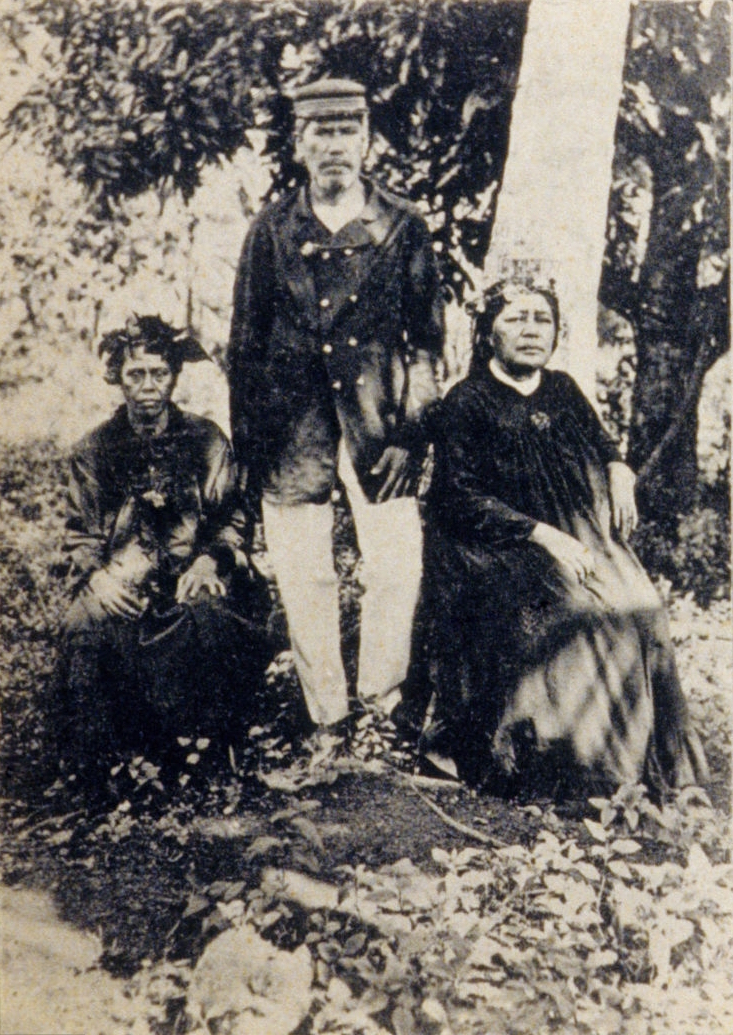
- Teraupo'o and his family on Raiatea, c. 1895
- Born: Hapaitahaa a Etau c. 1855; Avera, Raiatea
- Died: 23 December 1918; Vaiaau, Raiatea
- Known for: Resisted French rule from 1887 to 1897 during the decade-long Leeward Islands War

Teraupo'o (c. 1855 – 23 December 1918) was a Tahitian (Maohi) (Note: Maohi or Mā’ohi is the Tahitian name for the indigenous Tahitians people of the Society Islands without association with the largest and most populous islands of Tahiti. Other English exonyms exist for the other islands as well including Raiatean for an inhabitant of Raiatea.) resistance leader of the islands of Raiatea and Tahaa who fought off French rule from 1887 to 1897 during the decade-long Leeward Islands War.

Born during the decades following the Franco-Tahitian War (1844–1847), Teraupo'o was a lesser chief from the village of Avera, on the east coast of Raiatea. He grew to resent the French after being mistreated by an officer. After King Tamatoa VI of Raiatea submitted to French annexation, Teraupo'o refused to surrender and led the native resistance against the French and installed a resistance government under Tuarii as queen at Avera. He and his followers, dubbed the Teraupiste, included a majority of the natives of Raiatea and Tahaa. They fought off French colonial rule from 1887 until 1897 while attempting to convince the British to support their cause to remain independent.

The French under Governor Gustave Gallet sent for reinforcement to quell the native resistance and defeated the native forces of Raiatea in battle and the subsequent guerrilla campaign that followed. Teraupo'o was captured on the night of 15–16 February 1897. After he was defeated and captured, he was exiled to New Caledonia until 1905 when he was allowed to return to Raiatea. He lived out the rest of his life as a recluse and died in 1918 of the Spanish flu epidemic.

== Early life ==
He was born in c. 1855 with the name Hapaitahaa a Etau, at Avera, a village on the east coast of the island of Raiatea in the Leeward Islands, a part of the larger Society Islands group. He also initially bore the name Taraiupo'o, meaning "Headhunter", while his later adopted name Teraupo'o, meaning "This Head" in the Tahitian language. (Note: According to French historian Bruno Saura: "It was also nearly a century later that his indirect descendants (Teraupoo died in 1918 in Raiatea, without any immediate descendants) began to speak about the taunting they endured in their child they were members of the family of Teraupoo ʻorure hau rebel). It is true that his fairly rare first name and surname—especially Te-rau-upoʻo (the leaf/the greenery of/for the head) lends itself to multiple interpretations. One of his descendants, Teddy Tefaatau, mayor of Tevaitoa at the time, explained that his "great great uncle was called Teraiupoo, coupeur de têtes ['executioner' or 'headsman'—literally, head cutter]. We preferred [to interpret it as] Tera-upoo, 'this head'" Besse 2010.") Teraupo'o was considered a "chief of a minor lineage".

The Society Islands were evangelized by British missionaries and converted to Protestant Christianity by the London Missionary Society (LMS) in the early 19th century. The ari'i rahi (supreme rulers) were early patrons of the British Protestants. By the mid-19th century, the adoption of a British parliamentary system of government eroded the traditional supremacy of the ari'i rahi in favor of the ra'atira (freemen) class. Local chiefs and tāvana (district governors) gain greater power and autonomy at the expense of the nominal island monarchs especially in Raiatea-Tahaa. A decade before Teraupo'o's birth, the neighboring Kingdom of Tahiti had been subjugated under a protectorate in the Franco-Tahitian War (1844–1847) but the kingdoms of the Leeward Islands including Raiatea-Tahaa were ensured independence by France and Great Britain under the Jarnac Convention or the Anglo-French Convention of 1847.

According to French historian Auguste Charles Eugène Caillot, Teraupo'o grew to resent the French after he was kicked by a French captain or pilot in Raiatea. He allegedly received a kick from the officer in “dans la partie la moins noble de son individu" (the least noble part of his person).

== French annexation ==
In 1880, King Tahitoe of Raiatea accepted the provisional protectorate by French commissioner Isidore Chessé. Tahitoe was deposed by his subjects for requesting the protectorate and his daughter and successor Queen Tehauroa unsuccessfully attempted to enlist the protection of the British to preserve the independence of Raiatea in accordance with the Convention of 1847. On 16 March 1888, the French annexed Raiatea and Tahaa after formal negotiation between Great Britain and France abrogated the 1847 Convention.

The last independent monarch of Raiatea-Tahaa, King Tamatoa VI was originally from the royal family of Huahine. On 25 September 1887, five chiefs of Raiatea petitioned Papeete to send a French resident administrator. Teraupo'o refused to comply with the order of King Tamatoa VI to surrender to the French, and he built up a resistance force in 1887. Two French warships and government schooner was landed in Raiatea to override the ruling of the native courts to the advantage of a few European residents disgruntled with the recent economic depression of the copra and cotton trade. This action resulted in greater resentment within the rank of the anti-French faction of the population. LMS missionary William Edward Richards wrote that Tamatoa "abdicated rather than become the tool of the native French party" and "One or two villages [were] shelled and a great many native houses burnt down" by the French...and this made the Raiateans still more ‘resolute’ not to ‘yield quietly’ as the missionary advised". Tamatoa VI returned to Huahine to become a tāvana (district governor) and left the government of Raiatea without a king.

== War of resistance ==
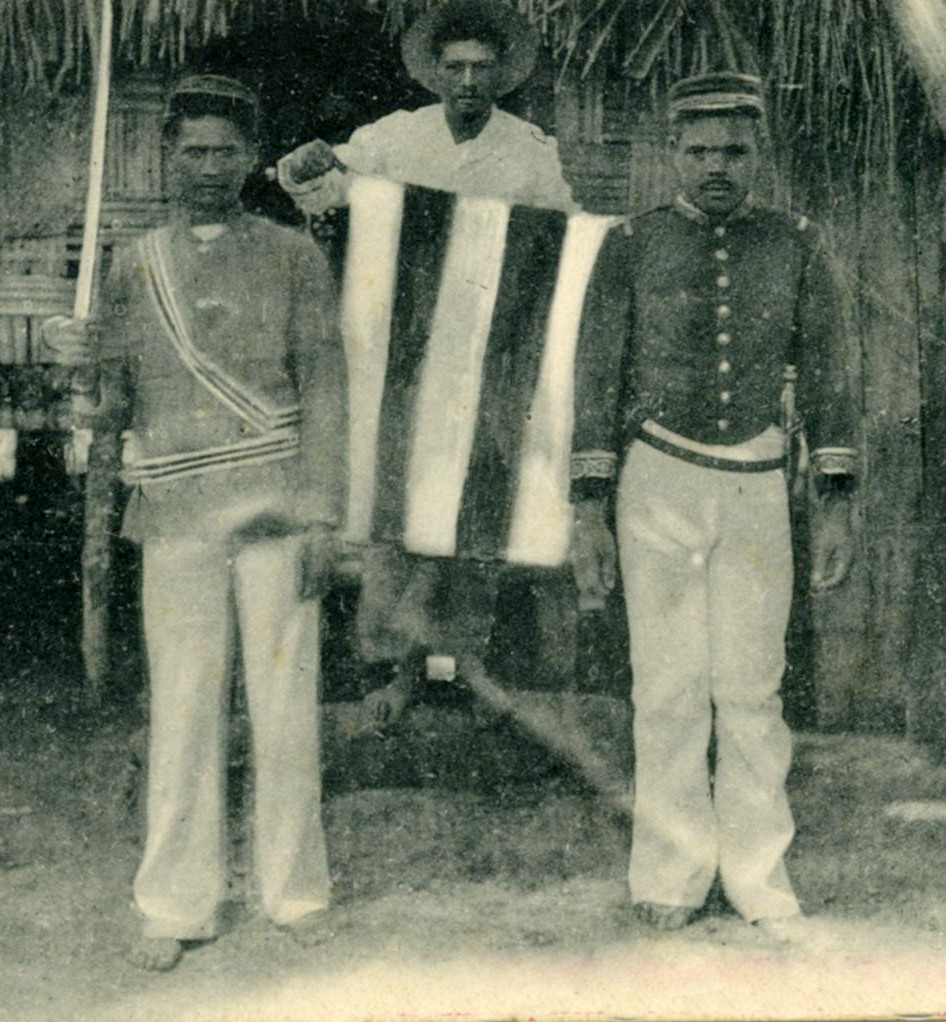
Indigenous officers holding the independent flag of Raiatea at Avera, c. 1895

Richards wrote in 1888 that "the whole of the Raiatean Government (save one governor Teraupoo) were enrolled as Frenchmen and nearly the whole of the people banded together as one man to resist them." Teraupo'o led the native resistance against the French in the place of Tamatoa VI. He installed a resistance government under Tuarii (a younger daughter of Tahitoe) as queen at Avera. The French established themselves at the former capital of Uturoa and appointed a résident, Marie Maximilien Gustave Alby, and had the support of Tahaa chief Tavana who became known as the viceroy of Raiatea-Tahaa. A prolonged war prevented the French from entering the rural areas of Raiatea as the native resorted to guerrilla warfare. The conflict leading to the annexation of the Leeward Islands became known as the Leewards War, the Raiatean rebellion or the Teraupo’o War.

Bearing his rifle, the "'oporo 'ute'ute" or "red pepper", Teraupo'o was able to muster a force of 800 men or nearly one third of the population of the island although Newbury noted that "hardly more than 359 Ra'iateans [were] under arms". The followers of the rebel chief were referred to as the Teraupiste. Teraupo'o's brother Hupe served as his généralissime or general-in-chief. The courageous chiefess Mai of Tevaitoa and her husband Moti Roi and the chief Faterehau of Opoa and his wife, a half-white woman, named Taupe allied themselves with the Teraupiste. Foreign residents were also attracted to his cause. Jose Jordan, son of American settler and blacksmith Joseph Jordan, was a partisan of Teraupo'o, and was later exiled for his involvement. The German G. Neuffer became an adopted son of Teraupo'o and supplied him with arms and funds.

From the few surviving letters of Teraupo'o, he was known to have been resolute in the belief that Great Britain would intervene on the behalf of their cause and rescue the natives from the French. The Raiateans unsuccessfully appealed to Robert Teesdale Simons, the British Consul in Tahiti, for assistance and offered their country to the "Great White Queen". In 1895, Queen Tuarii travelled to the British protectorate Rarontonga to seek help from the British Resident Frederick Moss who refused to meet with her.

Attempts were made to mediate the conflict by Consul Simons and Tati Salmon, an Anglo-Tahitian businessman of royal descent. The French Protestant missionary Jean-Frédéric Vernier, former chaplain of Tahiti's Queen Pōmare IV, also unsuccessfully attempted to sway the natives. Teraupo'o also controlled the Raiatean pastors. French Protestant missionary Pastor Gaston Brunel, who took charge of the Protestant schools on the island in 1894, was largely sympathetic to the natives. Brunel visited the camp of the resistance leader often and gained valuable insight into the rebellion. French artist Paul Gauguin, who witnessed the final phase of the rebellion, noted that diplomacy failed to persuade the natives of Raiatea to surrender. Gauguin also witnessed the 1896 expedition to Raiatea.

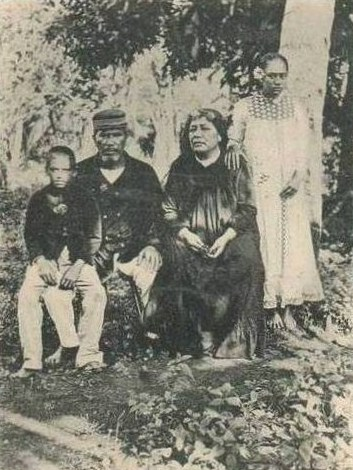
Teraupo'o with his family, c. 1895

The French appointed Governor Gustave Gallet to suppress the entrenched rebellion. Gallet had previous experience with suppressing the 1878 Kanak rebellion in New Caledonia. In 1896, two French warships, the Duguay Trouin and L'Aube arrived from New Caledonia with two hundred French soldiers to quell the native resistance. The invasion force was further reinforced with a company of Tahitian volunteers. On 27 December 1896, Governor Gallet attempted to parley with the rebels to avoid bloodshed. He set an ultimatum for the rebels to surrender by 1 January 1897. The rebel government at Avera under Queen Tuarii and 1700 rebels reluctantly surrendered. Teraupo'o and the rebels of Tahaa and the district of Tevaitoa refused the call, prompting the French to land and engage the remaining armed natives. The French routed the underequipped and disorganized native forces and many fled into the mountains to escape capture.

The armed native resistance ended with the capture of Teraupo'o. He and his wife and daughter fled into the mountains of Vaiaau. They evaded the French expeditionary force by hiding in the cave in the Faneuhi mountain (located at 16°51′8″S 151°26′32″W) and rolling a boulder in front of the entrance during the day. The hiding place was discovered on the night of 15 February and 16 February 1897 when light from a fire within the cave gave the location away. On orders to capture him alive, Teraupo'o was led out of the cave by gunpoint while his family remained defiant. French historian Bruno Saura credited the discovery to "two Polynesians in the service of the French" while American historian Edward Dodd credited to an "astute French lieutenant". The casualties of the six-week campaign were nearly fifty deaths mainly on the side of the Raiateans.

== Exile and death ==
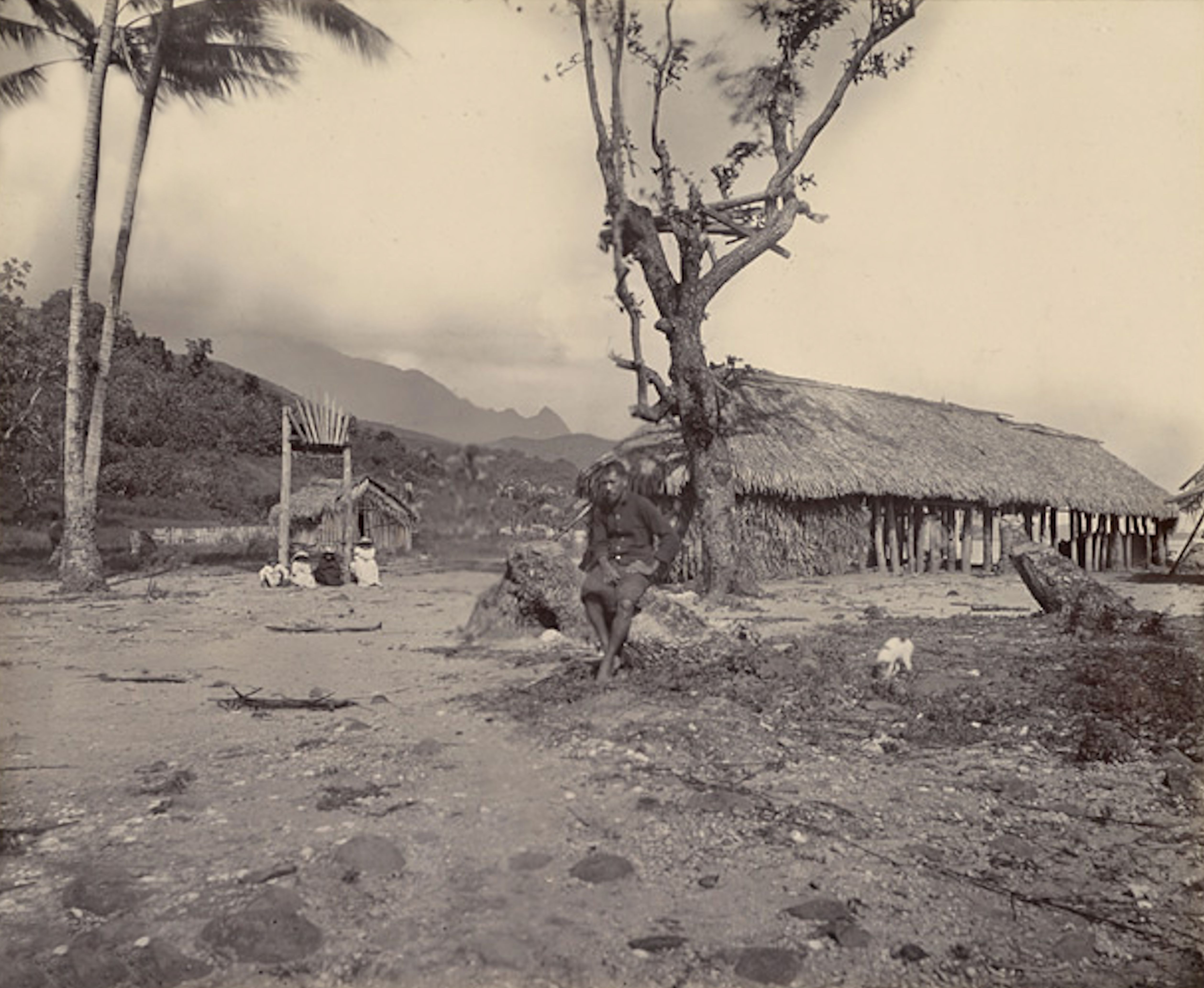
The pā or the military camp of Teraupo'o, 1897

After the capture of Teraupo'o, the Chamber of Deputies in Paris proclaimed "the victorious end of the last military campaign in our islands". The Chamber ratified annexation on 19 November 1897. The captured resistance leaders were deported to Nouméa, New Caledonia and their followers were deported to the Ua Huka in the Marquesas Islands while others were conscripted as forced laborers to improve the roads of Raiatea. Teraupo'o, his wife and his brother Hupe were exiled in New Caledonia until 1905.

Teraupo'o was allowed to return to Raiatea in 1905 and lived out the rest of his life as a "silent, unreconstructed recluse". He died at Vaiaau on 23 December 1918, at the height of the Spanish flu epidemic. His grave is currently located at Pamatai point (located at 16°49′9″S 151°28′56″W) under a road. The next indigenous leader to advocate French resistance and Tahitian separatism was Pouvanaa a Oopa in 1958.

== Bibliography ==
- Baré, Jean-François (July–December 1984). "Fantômes de la violence: Énigmes tahitiennes". Études rurales (in French). 71 (95/96). Paris: 23–46. doi:10.3406/rural.1984.3017. JSTOR 20122163. OCLC 5547000185.
- Caillot, Auguste Charles Eugène (1910). Histoire de la Polynésie Orientale (in French). Paris: E. Leroux. OCLC 1035730173.
- Caillot, Auguste Charles Eugène (1909). Les Polynésiens orientaux au contact de la civilisation (in French). Paris: E. Leroux. OCLC 1073442925.
- Chesneau, Joseph (August 1928). "Notes sur Huahine et autres Iles-Sous-le-Vent". Bulletin de la Société des Études Océaniennes (in French) (26). Papeete: Société des Études Océaniennes: 81–98. OCLC 9510786.
- Craig, Robert D. (2010). Historical Dictionary of Polynesia. Lanham: Scarecrow Press. ISBN 978-1-4616-5938-9. OCLC 817559562.
- Dodd, Edward (1983). The Rape of Tahiti. New York: Dodd, Mead & Company. ISBN 978-0-396-08114-2. OCLC 8954158.
- Flude, Anthony G. (March 2012). "Manuscript XXIII: A Raiatean Petition for American Protection". The Journal of Pacific History. 47 (1). Canberra: Australian National University: 111–121. doi:10.1080/00223344.2011.632982. OCLC 785915823. S2CID 159847026.
- Garrett, John (1992). Footsteps in the Sea: Christianity in Oceania to World War II. Geneva: World Council of Churches; Suva: Institute of Pacific Studies, University of the South Pacific. ISBN 978-982-02-0068-5. OCLC 26334630.
- Garrett, John (1982). To Live Among the Stars: Christian Origins in Oceania. Suva, Fiji: Institute of Pacific Studies, University of the South Pacific. ISBN 978-2-8254-0692-2. OCLC 17485209.
- Gonschor, Lorenz Rudolf (August 2008). Law as a Tool of Oppression and Liberation: Institutional Histories and Perspectives on Political Independence in Hawaiʻi, Tahiti Nui/French Polynesia and Rapa Nui (PDF) (MA thesis). Honolulu: University of Hawaii at Manoa. hdl:10125/20375. OCLC 798846333. Archived from the original (PDF) on 2020-01-02.
- Hall, Douglas B.; Osborne, Lord Albert (1901). Sunshine and Surf: A Year's Wanderings in the South Seas. London: Adam and Charles Black. OCLC 499468568.
- Huguenin, Paul (1902). Raiatea La Sacrée: Iles Sous Le Vent de Tahiti (Océanie Francaise) Avec 24 Planches En Couleur, Reproduction Des Aquarelles Originales de l'Auteur (in French). Neuchatel: P. Attinger. OCLC 69497948.
- Jaulmes, Edouard (1970). "Edouard Jaulmes, Premier instituteur à Raiatea. Relation du voyage et du séjour". Journal de la Société des Océanistes (in French). 26 (26). Paris: Societe des Oceanistes: 63–78. doi:10.3406/jso.1970.2285. OCLC 8334964462.
- Juster, Alexandre (2016). L'histoire de la Polynésie française en 101 dates: 101 événements marquants qui ont fait l'histoire de Tahiti et ses îles (in French). Les éditions de Moana. ISBN 978-2-9556860-1-0. OCLC 967724693.
- Kirk, Robert W. (2012). Paradise Past: The Transformation of the South Pacific, 1520–1920. Jefferson, NC: McFarland & Company, Inc., Publishers. ISBN 978-0-7864-9298-5. OCLC 1021200953.
- Layton, Monique (2015). The New Arcadia: Tahiti's Cursed Myth. Victoria, BC: FriesenPress. ISBN 978-1-4602-6860-5. OCLC 930600657.
- Lovett, Richard (1899). The History of the London Missionary Society, 1795–1895. London: H. Frowde. OCLC 221934284.
- Matsuda, Matt K. (2005). "Society Islands: Tahitian Archives". Empire of Love: Histories of France and the Pacific. New York: Oxford University Press. pp. 91–112. ISBN 978-0-19-534747-0. OCLC 191036857.
- McArthur, Norma (1967). "Leeward Islands". Island Populations of the Pacific (PDF). Canberra: Australian National University Press. pp. 265–279. OCLC 1647169.
- Newbury, Colin W. (1956). The Administration of French Oceania, 1842–1906 (PDF) (PhD thesis). Canberra: A Thesis submitted for the degree of Doctor of Philosophy in the Australian National University. hdl:1885/9609. OCLC 490766020.
- Newbury, Colin W. (March 1967). "Aspects of Cultural Change in French Polynesia: The Decline of the Ari'i". The Journal of the Polynesian Society. 76 (1). Wellington: The Polynesian Society: 7–26. JSTOR 20704439. OCLC 6015277685. Archived from the original on 2019-01-27.
- Newbury, Colin W. (September 2009). "Pacts, Alliances and Patronage: Modes of Influence and Power in the Pacific". The Journal of Pacific History. 44 (2). Canberra: Australian National University: 141–162. doi:10.1080/00223340903142108. JSTOR 40346712. OCLC 4648099874. S2CID 142362747.
- Newbury, Colin W. (March 1973). "Resistance and Collaboration in French Polynesia: the Tahitian War: 1844–7". The Journal of the Polynesian Society. 82 (1). Wellington: The Polynesian Society: 5–27. JSTOR 20704899. OCLC 5544738080. Archived from the original on 2019-01-27.
- Newbury, Colin W. (1980). Tahiti Nui: Change and Survival in French Polynesia, 1767–1945 (PDF). Honolulu: University Press of Hawaii. hdl:10125/62908. ISBN 978-0-8248-8032-3. OCLC 1053883377. Archived from the original (PDF) on 2019-11-10.
- Oliver, Douglas L. (1974). Ancient Tahitian Society. Honolulu: University of Hawaii Press. doi:10.2307/j.ctvp2n5ds. hdl:1885/114907. ISBN 978-0-8248-8453-6. OCLC 1126284798. S2CID 165869849.
- O'Reilly, Patrick; Teissier, Raoul (1962). Tahitiens: répertoire bio-bibliographique de la Polynésie française (in French) (1st ed.). Paris: Musée de l'homme. OCLC 1001078211.
- Pallander, Edwin (1901). The Log of an Island Wanderer: Notes of Travel in the Eastern Pacific. London: C. A. Pearson. OCLC 5434471.
- Saura, Bruno (2015). "Remembrance of the Colonial Past in the French Islands of the Pacific: Speeches, Representations, and Commemorations". The Contemporary Pacific. 27 (2, SPECIAL ISSUE: Decolonization, Language, and Identity: The Francophone Islands of the Pacific). Honolulu: University of Hawaii Press: 337–368. doi:10.1353/cp.2015.0036. hdl:10125/42538. JSTOR 24809936. OCLC 7973864301. S2CID 162013731.
- Teissier, Raoul (1978). "Chefs et notables des Établissements Français de l'Océanie au temps du protectorat: 1842–1850". Bulletin de la Société des Études Océaniennes (in French) (202). Papeete: Société des Études Océaniennes. OCLC 9510786.
