= French annexation of the Leeward Islands =

Armed and diplomatic conflicts between France and native kingdoms of French Polynesia

Leewards War
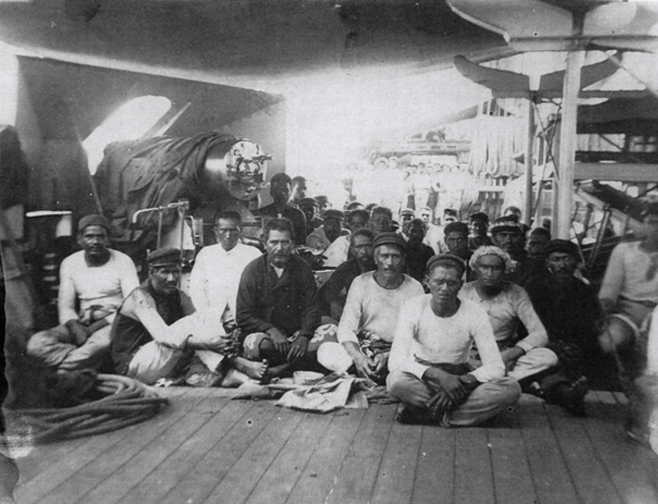
- The captured rebels of Raiatea, 1897
Date	1887–1897
Location	Society Islands (mainly in the Leeward Islands)
Result	French victory
Territorial changes	Annexation of the Leeward Islands to the French colonial empire

Belligerents
France; Tahiti (French protectorate)	Raiatea-Tahaa; Huahine; Bora Bora

Commanders and leaders
(French Third Republic) Gustave Gallet (French Third Republic) Henri Chessé (French Third Republic) Étienne Lacascade (French Third Republic) Alfred La Guerre (French Third Republic) Louis Reux (French Third Republic) Charles Bayle (French Third Republic) Paul Chocheprat Pro-French allies: Tavana; Marama Teururai	Teraupo'o; Tūari'i; Teuhe

The annexation of the Leeward Islands (French: Annexion des îles Sous-le-vent) or the Leewards War (French: Guerre des îles Sous-le-vent) was a series of diplomatic and armed conflicts between 1887 and 1897, pitting the French Third Republic against the native kingdoms of Raiatea-Tahaa, Huahine and Bora Bora and resulting in the conquest of the Leeward Islands, in the South Pacific archipelago of the Society Islands in modern-day French Polynesia.

This conflict was the last phase of armed indigenous resistance against French rule in the Society Islands, which began in 1843 with the forcible imposition of a protectorate over the Kingdom of Tahiti in the Franco-Tahitian War. The three Leeward Islands kingdoms to the northwest of Tahiti were ensured independence by the Jarnac Convention, a joint agreement signed between France and Great Britain in 1847. Continual instability in the native regimes and the growing threat of the nascent German colonial empire in the Pacific prompted France to declare the islands under a provisional protectorate in 1880, in violation of the 1847 Convention. In 1888, France and Britain agreed to abrogate their previous treaty and allow the French to annex the Leeward Islands.

From 1888 to 1897, the Leeward Island natives resisted the French while civil wars also broke out between pro-French factions and the majority anti-French sectors of the population. Armed conflict began in 1887 with the revolt of the chief Teraupo'o on Raiatea against the pro-French king and the shooting of a French officer and marines on Huahine. The natives of Huahine set up a rival royal government under Queen Teuhe to resist the pro-French factions under her brother Prince Marama Teururai. The resistance was strongest on Raiatea and Tahaa where the chief Teraupo'o and his followers entrenched themselves in the countryside and the mountains and sought British intervention in the war. The conflict ended with the violent suppression of the Raiatean rebellion and the exile of the rebels in 1897.

== Name ==
The conflict has been referred to by a variety of names. Historian John Dumore referred to the conflict as the "Leewards War" in 1997. Historian Matt K. Matsuda noted in Empire of Love: Histories of France and the Pacific, "Struggles in Huahine, Bora Bora, and Raiatea continued over decades as the 'Leewards War,' little remembered in French Pacific scholarship." The Historical Dictionary of Polynesia called the conflict, the "Teraupo'o War" or the "War of Teraupo'o" after the Raiatean resistance leader Teraupo'o. French school teacher Paul Huguenin, who authored Raiatea La Sacrée, a 1902 book on Raiatea's history and traditions, referred to the conflict as the Conquête des Iles sous le Vent. Auguste Charles Eugène Caillot, author of Les Polynesiens Orientaux Au Contact de la Civilisation (1909), referred to the conflict as la guerre de Raiatea-Tahaa. Pierre-Yves Toullelan, author of the article "Le colonialisme triomphant: Tahiti et la IIIe République" (1990), referred to the conflict as "la guerre des îles Sous-le-Vent". Alexandre Juster, author of L'histoire de la Polynésie française en 101 dates (2016), refers to the conflict as "la guerre des Iles sous le Vent".

== Background ==
=== Prelude ===
Topographic map of the Leeward Islands

The Society Islands are subdivided into the Leeward Islands in the northwest and Windward Islands or Georgian Islands in the southeast. The Windward Islands include Tahiti, Moorea, Mehetia, Tetiaroa and Maiao. Politically, the Kingdom of Tahiti comprised all the Windward Islands except Maiao and also held nominal sovereignty over the more distant Tuamotus archipelago and a few of the Austral Islands. By the mid-19th century the Leeward Islands was made up of three kingdoms: the Kingdom of Huahine and its dependency of Maiao (geographically part of the Windward Islands); the Kingdom of Raiatea-Tahaa, and the Kingdom of Bora Bora with its dependencies of Maupiti, Tupai, Maupihaa, Motu One, and Manuae.

Tahiti was converted to Protestant Christianity by the London Missionary Society (LMS) in the early 19th century. The Pōmare Dynasty, patrons of the British Protestant missionaries, established their rule over Tahiti and Moorea as part of the Kingdom of Tahiti. Western concepts of kingdoms and nation states were foreign to the native Tahitians or Maohi, (Note: Maohi or Mā’ohi is the Tahitian language name for the indigenous Polynesian people of the Society Islands without association with the largest and most populous islands of Tahiti. Other English exonyms exist for the other islands as well including the Raiatean of Raiatea, the Tahaan of Tahaa, the Moorean or Moorea, the Huahinean of Huahine, the Boraboran of Bora Bora and the Maupitian of Maupiti.) people who were divided into loosely defined tribal units and districts before European contact. The first Christian king, Pōmare II headed the hau pahu rahi ("government of the great drum") or hau feti'i ("family government"), a traditional alliance of the inter-related chiefly families of the Society Islands. Christianity spread to the remaining islands after his conversion. He held nominal suzerainty over the other Society Islands. This was later misinterpreted by Europeans as sovereignty or subjugation of the other islands to Tahiti.

In the 1830s and 1840s, tensions between French naval interests, the British settlers and pro-British native chieftains on Tahiti led to the Franco-Tahitian War (1844–1847) and the voluntary exile of Queen Pōmare IV to Raiatea. Tahitian guerilla resistance on Tahiti was forcibly stamped out by the French administration with the capture of Fort Fautaua. Attempts to forcefully incorporate the neighbouring kingdoms of the Leeward Islands (west of Mo'orea) ceased following increased diplomatic pressure from Great Britain, and after a French expeditionary force was defeated on Huahine by Queen Teriitaria II in January 18 and 19, 1846. On February 7, 1847, Queen Pōmare IV returned from her exile and acquiesced to rule under the protectorate government centered in Papeete. Although victorious, the French were unable to annex the islands due to diplomatic pressure from Great Britain, so Tahiti and its dependency of Moorea continued to be ruled under the French protectorate. The Jarnac Convention or the Anglo-French Convention of 1847 was also signed by the French and the British, in which both powers agreed to respect the independence of Huahine, Raiatea, and Bora Bora.

=== Period of independence ===
For the next four decades, the three northern kingdoms remained nominally independent from the French in Papeete and remained strongly pro-British because of the influence of the LMS missionaries who remained stationed on the islands. However, economic and political instabilities were continual threats. Although Bora Bora remained politically stable, decades of political unrest plagued the islands of Huahine, Raiatea and Tahaa. The adoption of a British parliamentary system of government eroded the traditional supremacy of the ari'i rahi ("supreme rulers") in favor of the ra'atira ("freeman") class. Local chiefs and district governors (tāvana) gained greater power and autonomy at the expense of the nominal island monarchs. On Huahine, the warrior queen Teriitaria II was deposed in 1852 and her successor Ari'imate was deposed in 1868. On Raiatea, King Tamatoa IV was deposed in 1853 and later recalled. His successor Tamatoa V of Raiatea was deposed for the first time in 1858 and again in 1871. The next king, Tahitoe, who was one of the district governors, was deposed in 1881 for aligning with the French. LMS missionary and acting British consul on Raiatea, Alexander Chisholm, declared, "The foolish people seem determined to prove to the whole world that they cannot govern themselves."

Externally, the island governments feared intervention from the French in each succession crisis and the encroachment of other colonial powers. In 1858, the American consul in Raiatea unsuccessfully attempted to declare a protectorate over or annex Raiatea and Tahaa to the United States. In the late 1870s, there were worries that the German Empire would also incorporate the islands through annexation or a protectorate as part of its nascent colonial empire in the Pacific. The proposed Panama Canal connecting the Atlantic and Pacific also increased the value of territorial claims in the Pacific. Huahine signed a treaty of friendship with Germany in May 1879, which was never ratified by the German government. On Tahiti, King Pōmare V abdicated on 29 June 1880 and the Tahitian kingdom was annexed to France.

Internal warfare and introduced diseases, such as dysentery, scarlet fever, measles, whooping cough and typhoid, contributed to a general decline of native populations after European contact. The native population of the Leeward Islands numbered around 5,000 to 6,000 people throughout much of the mid and late 19th century. In 1897, a census of the Leeward Islands recorded: 1,237 people on Huahine, 2,138 people on Raiatea, 1,099 people on Tahaa, 1,264 people on Bora Bora, and 536 on Maupiti. The more isolated Maiao had a sporadic population and numbered less than 100 people by 1871. The 1897 the populations of Tahiti and Moorea were around 10,000 and 1,500 respectively and had decreased in the same period between the 1880s and 1890s. Australian demographer Norma McArthur noted that: "If a mission estimate (Cooper, 1884b) of 'about 5,500' people in the Leeward Islands in 1884 was reasonable, the population had increased by nearly 1,000 by 1897, and this represents an average annual increase of about 1½ percent." However, the exact percentage of population growth due to births versus immigration is hard to determine.

== Annexation of the Leeward Islands ==
Responding to the growing threat of Germany in the Pacific, the French took actions to abrogate the Convention of 1847 and bring the Leeward Islands into their sphere of influence. In 1880 French Commissioner Isidore Chessé convinced the islanders of the growing German threat and urged them to request for French protection. In Raiatea (see below), King Tahitoe and his chiefs signed a request for French protection and hoisted the protectorate flag on 9 April 1880. Chessé was unable to convince Huahine and Bora Bora to sign similar agreements.

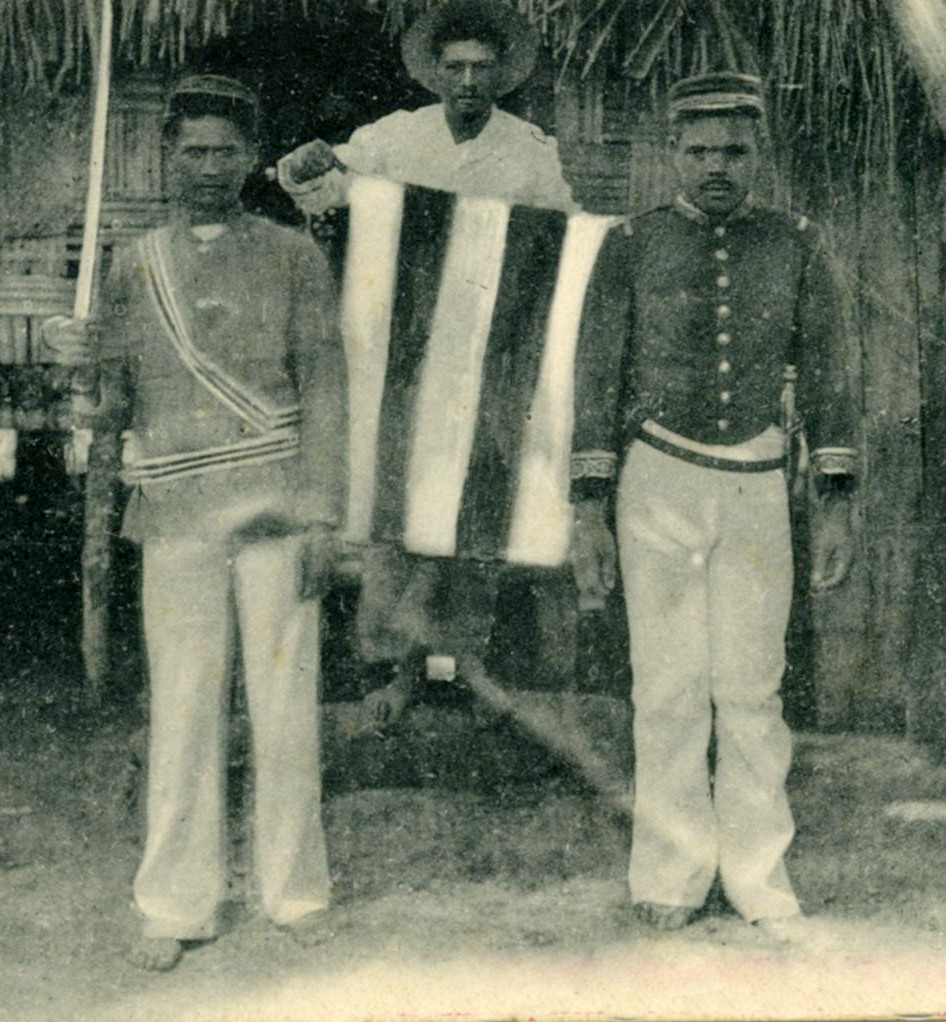
Indigenous officers holding the independent flag of Raiatea at Avera, c. 1895

The imposition of the French protectorate on the Leeward Islands was initially disavowed by the minister of foreign affairs, Jules Barthélemy-Saint-Hilaire, and the French government. Commercial groups in Hamburg and Berlin protested the actions of the French, but the British Foreign Office was less ambivalent, seeing a French takeover as a foregone conclusion, and was open to negotiations in exchange for French concessions. A provisional protectorate was established as France and Great Britain re-negotiated the details of the Jarnac Convention. Speculations included the French concessions in the Pacific or West Africa or the cession of fishing rights in the French Shore off Newfoundland. The convention was finally abrogated in exchange for French military concessions in the New Hebrides. The Convention relating to the New Hebrides and the Leeward islands of Tahiti was signed at Paris on 16 November 1887 and the Declaration for the Abrogation of the Declaration of the 19th June, 1847, between Great Britain and France concerning the Islands to the leeward of Tahiti was signed at Paris on 30 May 1888. News of the change reached Papeete in the beginning of 1888, allowing the French annexation of the islands to commence.

After the removal of this diplomatic obstacle, Governor Théodore Lacascade officially annexed all of the Leeward Islands on 16 March 1888 via proclamation. The Proclamation de Gouverneur aux habitant des Îles sous le Vent à l'occasion de l'annexion de ces îles à la France was done without documents of cession from the former sovereign government of the islands. Lacascade traveled to the Leeward Islands to proclaim the annexation. The mission was accompanied by the French naval warship Decrès, under the command of Captain Alfred Charles Marie La Guerre, and the schooner Aorai, under the command of Captain Louis Marie Reux. Lacascade with other French officials and naval officers took possessions of the islands and raised the flag of France on Huahine (16 March), Raiatea (17 March) and Bora Bora (19 March). The annexation was nominal and native autonomy and resistance continued on the islands for another decade.

=== Raiatea ===
In 1880, King Tahitoe accepted the provisional protectorate by Chessé and raised the protectorate flag of Raiatea with the French tricolour on its canton. Captain Mervyn B. Medlycott of the corvette HMS Turquoise ordered French Lieutenant Félix Marie Salaun de Kertanguy, of the war schooner Orohéna, to lower the protectorate flag, and in its place the Raiatean flag was hoisted and accorded a royal salute. According to Guy Hardy Scholefield, "The French flag was permitted to be rehoisted provisionally on 25 May 1881, for periods of six months, the discussion being renewed from time to time." Tahitoe was deposed by his subjects for requesting the protectorate. His daughter and successor, Queen Tehauroa, unsuccessfully attempted to enlist the protection of the British to preserve Raiatea's independence in accordance with the Jarnac Convention. On 17 March 1888, Governor Lacascade took possession of Raiatea and Tahaa and raised the French flag.

On 25 September 1887, five chiefs of Raiatea petitioned Papeete to send a French resident administrator. Teraupo'o, a lesser chief of Raiatea known for his fierce opposition to the French, refused to comply with the order of King Tamatoa VI to surrender to them and built up a resistance force. The following year, King Tamatoa VI, originally from the royal family of Huahine, abdicated (Note: Historian Colin Newbury noted: "When the unpopular ari'i of Raiatea, Tamatoa, was forced by his people to abdicate, a chief of Tahaa was appointed in his place by the French and two villages were bombarded in November 1887 when objection were raised.") to avoid being used by the French and returned to Huahine to become a tāvana. In his place, Teraupo'o led the native resistance against the French and installed a resistance government under Tuarii (a younger daughter of Tahitoe) as queen at Avera. The French established themselves at the former capital of Uturoa and appointed a résident, Marie Maximilien Gustave Alby. The French also had the support of the chief Tavana, a former minister of Tamatoa who held the title of viceroy of Raiatea-Tahaa. A prolonged war prevented the French from entering the rural areas of Raiatea as the natives resorted to guerilla warfare.

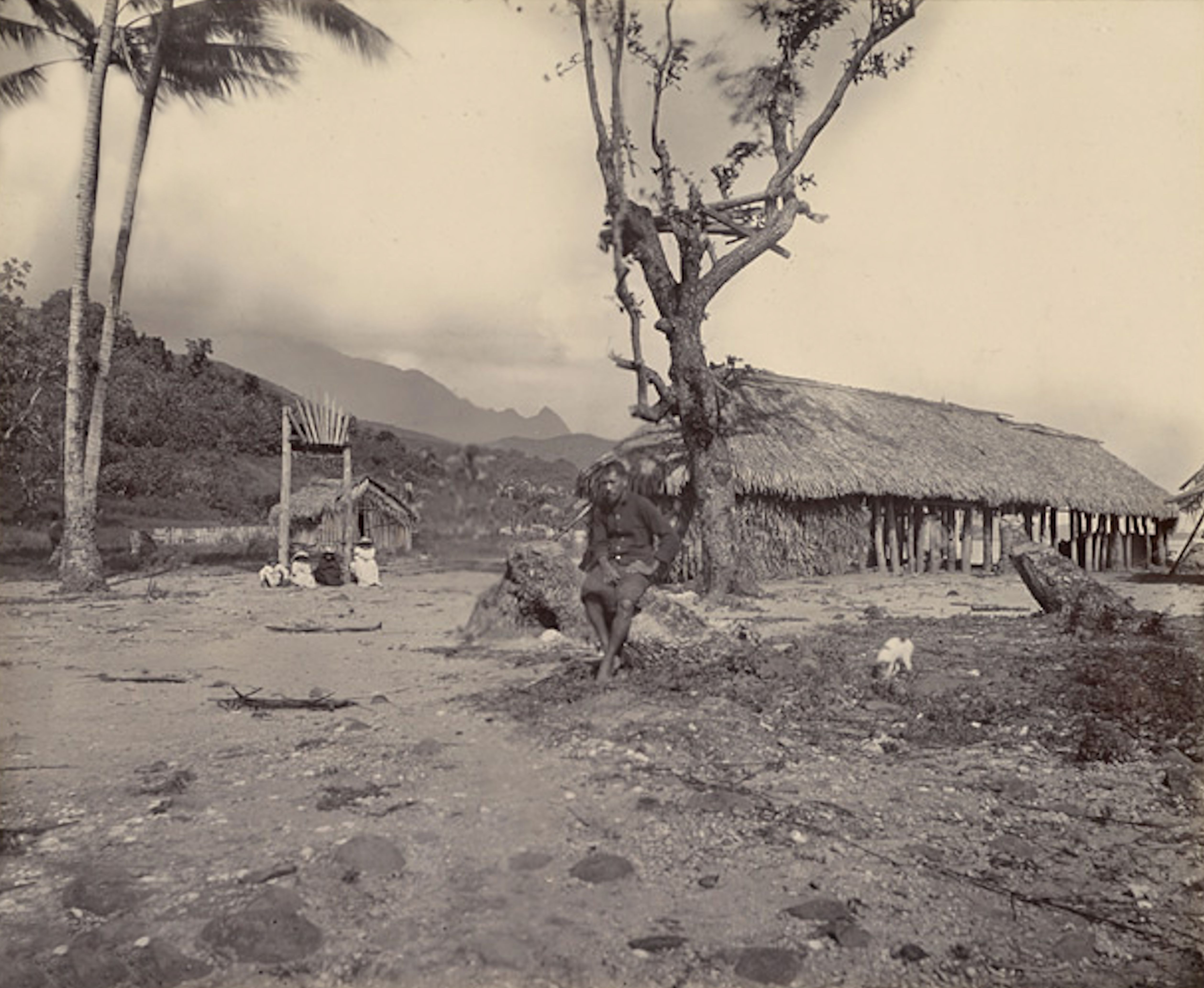
The pa or the military camp of Teraupo'o, 1897

The Raiateans unsuccessfully appealed to Robert Teesdale Simons, the British consul in Tahiti, for assistance and offered their country to the "Great White Queen". In 1895, Queen Tuarii traveled to the British protectorate Rarontonga to seek help from the British resident, Frederick Moss, who refused to meet with her.

Attempts were made to mediate the conflict by Consul Simons and Tati Salmon, an Anglo-Tahitian businessman of royal descent. The French Protestant missionary Jean-Frédéric Vernier, former chaplain of Queen Pōmare IV, also attempted unsuccessfully to sway the natives. Pastor Gaston Brunel, who took charge of the Protestant schools on the island in 1894 and was largely sympathetic to the natives, often visited the camp of the resistance leader and gained valuable insight into the rebellion. French artist Paul Gauguin, who witnessed the final phase of the rebellion, noted that diplomacy failed to persuade the natives of Raiatea to surrender. Gauguin also witnessed the 1896 expedition to Raiatea.

The French appointed Governor Gustave Gallet to defeat the entrenched rebellion by military force. Gallet had previous experience with suppressing the 1878 Kanak rebellion in New Caledonia. In 1896, two French warships, the cruiser Duguay-Trouin and the transporter Aube arrived from New Caledonia with two hundred French soldiers to quell the native resistance under the command of Captain Charles Jessé Bayle and Captain Paul Louis Albert Chocheprat, respectively. The invasion force was reinforced further with a company of Tahitian volunteers. On 27 December 1896, Governor Gallet attempted to parley with the rebels to avoid bloodshed. He set an ultimatum for the rebels to surrender by 1 January 1897. The rebel government at Avera under Queen Tuarii and 1,700 rebels reluctantly surrendered. Teraupo'o and the rebels of Tahaa and the district of Tevaitoa refused the call, prompting the French to land and engage the remaining armed natives. The French routed the under-equipped and disorganized native forces and many fled into the mountains to escape capture. The armed native resistance ended with the capture of the leading chief, Teraupo'o, on 15–16 February 1897. The casualties of the six-week campaign were nearly fifty deaths mainly on the side of the Raiateans.

The captured resistance leaders, including Teraupo'o, his wife, his brother and lieutenant Hupe, the chiefess Mai of Tevaitoa and six other men, were deported to Nouméa, New Caledonia. Their followers were exiled to the island of Ua Huka in the Marquesas Islands, while others were conscripted as forced laborers to improve the roads of Raiatea.

=== Huahine ===
The natives resisted the French on Huahine. Governor Lacascade took possession and raised the French flag over Huahine on 16 March 1888. A week later, on 21 March, Captain La Guerre, of the Decrès, landed a small party of French marines to arrest insurgents on Huahine on the way back to Tahiti. In retaliation, the natives killed the ship's ensign Louis Dénot, who was leading the detachment, and two marines and wounded five others. This marked the first bloodshed in the war of the Leeward Islands since Lacascade's annexation.

Ebenezer Vicessimus Cooper, the last LMS missionary in the Society Islands, was an observer of the conflict. He noted that the French acquisition had "long been a foregone conclusion" to foreign residents, but it met with the "determined opposition of more than three-fourths of the natives" on Huahine. The elderly queen Tehaapapa II and her son Prince-Regent Marama Teururai, who held the governmental position of Fa'aterehau or Prime Minister, accepted the French takeover. However, the anti-French forces rallied around Queen Teuhe, Marama's sister and former wife of Pōmare V, and set up a parallel rebel government from 1888 to 1890. This civil war continued until the nationalist forces were defeated by the forces of Tehaapapa II.

Cooper noted that "their Christianity under existing circumstances [was] nothing more than a name". He was banned from preaching for trying to prevent hostile native prayer-meetings for the defeat and destruction of the French. As the last the LMS missionary, Cooper left Huahine and care of the Society Islands to the missionaries of the Paris Evangelical Missionary Society in 1890.

Queen Tehaapapa II and her government formally requested a French protectorate on 30 July 1890. The royal government of Huahine persisted for five more years and Tehaapapa II was succeeded by her granddaughter Tehaapapa III in 1893. Historian Pierre-Yves Toullelan noted that Huahine did not lay down its arms until 1894. The anti-French nationalist factions remained a threat, and the queen asked for military assistance from the French on 14 January 1895. On 11 September 1895, the young queen and the native government formally ceded "forever and without reserve, the government of their country to France." Governor Pierre Papinaud accepted the cession and imposed a permanent administration on Huahine.

=== Bora Bora ===
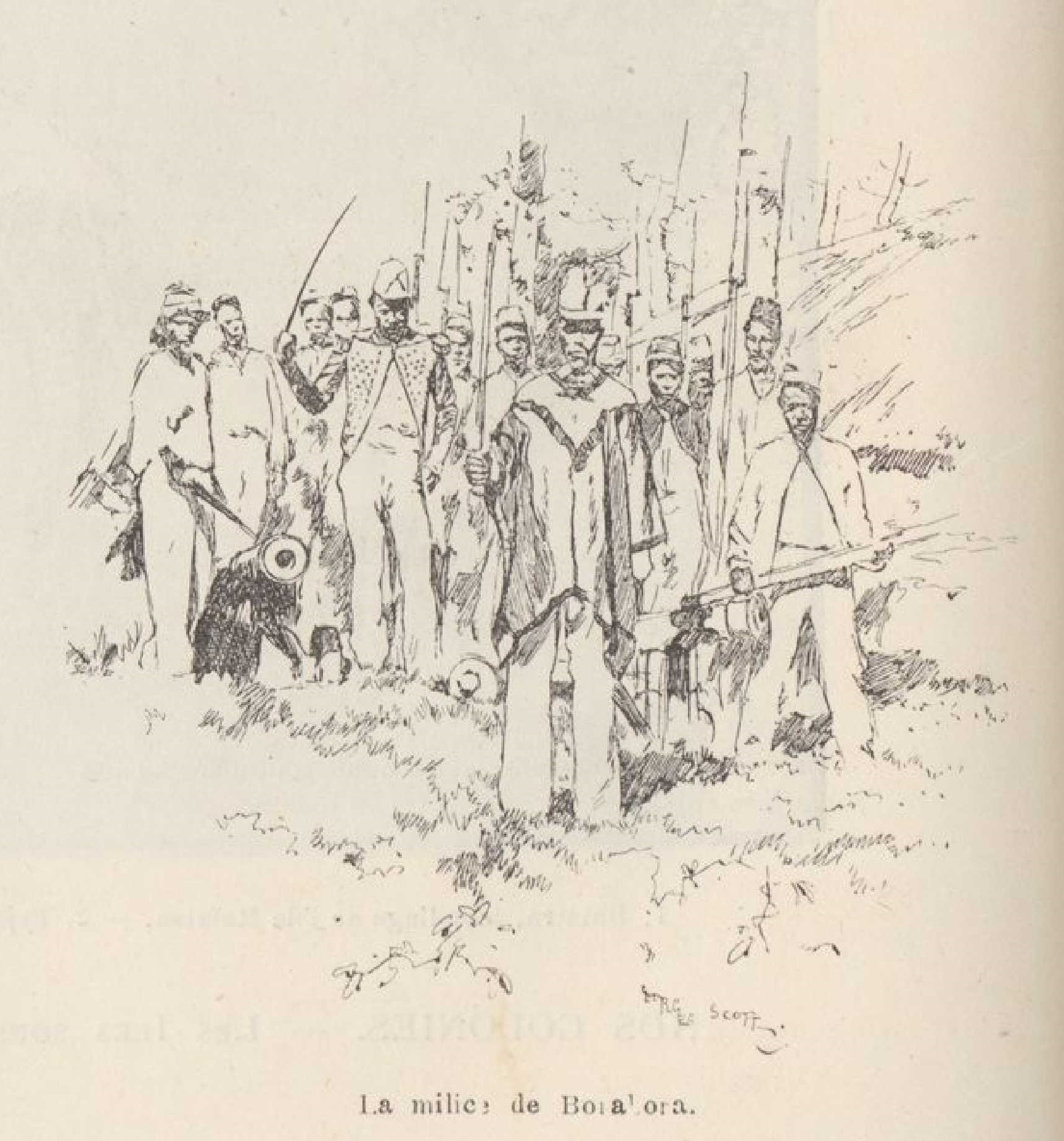
The militia of Bora Bora, 1895

Bora Bora and its dependencies were nominally annexed on 19 March 1888 by Governor Lacascade. Traditionally, Boraborans were regarded as the most warlike people of the archipelago. LMS missionary William Edward Richards wrote in 1888 that the Boraborans "were strongly opposed to the [French] flag, and it was feared that blood would be shed" but that they wisely appreciated their weakness and lack of "mountain strongholds", and "gradually settl[ed] down with bad grace into the inevitable". The islands were also recovering from a recent civil war between Bora Bora and secessionist forces in Maupiti in 1876. Toullelan noted that Bora Bora did not lay down its arms until 1894 but provided no details.

Bora Bora remained neutral during the conflicts of Raiatea which prevented the French from administering their new acquisition until September 1895. Through the persuasion of her ex-husband Prince Hinoi, Queen Teriimaevarua III accepted French administration and formally abdicated on 21 September 1895. Retaining her honor as queen, she was allowed to collect tributes from the outlying northern islands and was provided with a pension by the colonial government. A French vice-resident and later a gendarme was placed in charge of the islands, but they retained native laws and government for a few more years. In an ironic gesture of defiance, the islanders appointed a blind man to the office of French flag raiser. In 1898 the former queen, Teriimaevarua III, attempted to incite a new resistance movement in the islands and was exiled to Tahaa by the order Governor Gallet on 27 October 1898.

== Aftermath ==
After the capture of Teraupo'o, the Chamber of Deputies in Paris proclaimed "the victorious end of the last military campaign in our islands". The Chamber ratified annexation on 19 November 1897. The Code de l'indigénat or Native Code was imposed by the French to administer the Leeward Islanders as French subjects rather than French citizens. Native courts and judges were retained, except with regard to land legislation. European residents were tried under French law. The natives referred to the Indigénat system as hau tamaru ("protectorate government") in contrast with the hau farani ("French government"). Tahiti was not under the Indigénat system, but was ruled more directly by France under the French judicial system. The Native Code was not repealed until 1946.

By 1901, with the annexation of the last independent monarchies of Rimatara and Rurutu in the Austral Islands, the French Establishment of Oceania was formed. The five archipelagoes of the Society Islands, the Tuamotus, Austral Islands, Gambier Islands and Marquesas Islands were incorporated into the territory of French Oceania, which are today part of the overseas collectivity of French Polynesia. The French Protestant missionaries helped to preserve the indigenous language and culture of the islanders and the Maohi Protestant Church was later established to preserve the legacy of the indigenous and Protestant identity of the Society Islands.

== Bibliography ==
- Caillot, Auguste Charles Eugène (1910). Histoire de la Polynésie Orientale (in French). Paris: E. Leroux. OCLC 1035730173. Archived from the original on 1 January 2020.
- Caillot, Auguste Charles Eugène (1909). Les Polynesiens Orientaux Au Contact de la Civilisation (in French). Paris: E. Leroux. OCLC 248692586.
- Chesneau, Joseph (August 1928). "Notes sur Huahine et autres Iles-Sous-le-Vent". Bulletin de la Société des Études Océaniennes (in French) (26). Papeete: Société des Études Océaniennes: 81–98. OCLC 9510786. Archived from the original on 27 November 2019.
- Childs, Elizabeth C. (2013). Vanishing Paradise: Art and Exoticism in Colonial Tahiti. Berkeley: University of California Press. ISBN 978-0-520-27173-9. OCLC 1008173730.
- Cooke, C. Kinlock (July 1886). "France and the New Hebrides". The Nineteenth Century. London: Henry S. King & Company. pp. 118–129.
- Craig, Robert D. (2010). Historical Dictionary of Polynesia. Lanham: Scarecrow Press. ISBN 978-1-4616-5938-9. OCLC 817559562.
- Dodd, Edward (1983). The Rape of Tahiti. New York: Dodd, Mead & Company. ISBN 978-0-396-08114-2. OCLC 8954158. Archived from the original on 5 December 2019.
- Dunmore, John (1997). Visions & Realities: France in the Pacific, 1695–1995. Waikanae: Heritage Press. ISBN 978-0-908708-41-3. OCLC 1108149857.
- Flude, Anthony G. (March 2012). "Manuscript XXIII: A Raiatean Petition for American Protection". The Journal of Pacific History. 47 (1). Canberra: Australian National University: 111–121. doi:10.1080/00223344.2011.632982. OCLC 785915823. S2CID 159847026.
- Garanger, José; Robineau, Claude (1977). Bora-Bora. Paris: Nouvelles Editions Latines. OCLC 7101802. GGKEY:0E5JBJLXH6G.
- Garrett, John (1992). Footsteps in the Sea: Christianity in Oceania to World War II. Geneva: World Council of Churches; Suva: Institute of Pacific Studies, University of the South Pacific. ISBN 978-982-02-0068-5. OCLC 26334630. Archived from the original on 24 April 2017.
- Garrett, John (1982). To Live Among the Stars: Christian Origins in Oceania. Suva, Fiji: Institute of Pacific Studies, University of the South Pacific. ISBN 978-2-8254-0692-2. OCLC 17485209.
- Gonschor, Lorenz Rudolf (August 2008). Law as a Tool of Oppression and Liberation: Institutional Histories and Perspectives on Political Independence in Hawaiʻi, Tahiti Nui/French Polynesia and Rapa Nui (PDF) (MA thesis). Honolulu: University of Hawaii at Manoa. hdl:10125/20375. OCLC 798846333. Archived (PDF) from the original on 2 January 2020.
- Gonschor, Lorenz (2019). A Power in the World: The Hawaiian Kingdom in Oceania. Honolulu: University of Hawaii Press. ISBN 978-0-8248-8001-9. OCLC 1056198239.
- Hall, Douglas B.; Osborne, Lord Albert (1901). Sunshine and Surf: A Year's Wanderings in the South Seas. London: Adam and Charles Black. OCLC 499468568.
- Huguenin, Paul (1902). Raiatea La Sacrée: Iles Sous Le Vent de Tahiti (Océanie Francaise) Avec 24 Planches En Couleur, Reproduction Des Aquarelles Originales de l'Auteur (in French). Neuchatel: P. Attinger. OCLC 69497948.
- Jaulmes, Edouard (1970). "Edouard Jaulmes, Premier instituteur à Raiatea. Relation du voyage et du séjour". Journal de la Société des Océanistes (in French). 26 (26). Paris: Societe des Oceanistes: 63–78. doi:10.3406/jso.1970.2285. OCLC 8334964462. Archived from the original on 3 January 2020.
- Juster, Alexandre (2016). L'histoire de la Polynésie française en 101 dates: 101 événements marquants qui ont fait l'histoire de Tahiti et ses îles (in French). Les éditions de Moana. ISBN 978-2-9556860-1-0. OCLC 967724693.
- Kelly, John L. (1885). The South Sea Islands: Possibilities of Trade with New Zealand : Notes on the Situation, Climate, Products, Population, Government, and Commerce of the Islands of Tonga, Samoa, Rarotonga, and Tahiti, with Appendix of Statistics, Mail Information, Etc. Auckland: H. Brett. OCLC 741730153.
- Kirk, Robert W. (2012). Paradise Past: The Transformation of the South Pacific, 1520–1920. Jefferson, NC: McFarland & Company, Inc., Publishers. ISBN 978-0-7864-9298-5. OCLC 1021200953.
- Lacascade, Théodore (1888). "Documents respecting the Annexation to France of the Islands to the Leeward of Tahiti. – March 1888". In Great Britain. Foreign and Commonwealth Office (ed.). British and Foreign State Papers (in French). London: H.M. Stationery Office. pp. 152–158. OCLC 1605536.
- Layton, Monique (2015). The New Arcadia: Tahiti's Cursed Myth. Victoria, BC: FriesenPress. ISBN 978-1-4602-6860-5. OCLC 930600657. Archived from the original on 23 December 2019.
- Lovett, Richard (1899). The History of the London Missionary Society, 1795–1895. London: H. Frowde. OCLC 221934284.
- Matsuda, Matt K. (2005). "Society Islands: Tahitian Archives". Empire of Love: Histories of France and the Pacific. New York: Oxford University Press. pp. 91–112. ISBN 978-0-19-534747-0. OCLC 191036857. Archived from the original on 9 December 2019.
- McArthur, Norma (1967). "Leeward Islands". Island Populations of the Pacific (PDF). Canberra: Australian National University Press. pp. 265–279. OCLC 1647169. Archived (PDF) from the original on 8 December 2019.
- Newbury, Colin W. (1956). The Administration of French Oceania, 1842–1906 (PDF) (PhD thesis). Canberra: A Thesis submitted for the degree of Doctor of Philosophy in the Australian National University. hdl:1885/9609. OCLC 490766020. Archived (PDF) from the original on 8 December 2019.
- Newbury, Colin W. (March 1967). "Aspects of Cultural Change in French Polynesia: The Decline of the Ari'i". The Journal of the Polynesian Society. 76 (1). Wellington: The Polynesian Society: 7–26. JSTOR 20704439. OCLC 6015277685. Archived from the original on 27 January 2019.
- Newbury, Colin W. (September 2009). "Pacts, Alliances and Patronage: Modes of Influence and Power in the Pacific". The Journal of Pacific History. 44 (2). Canberra: Australian National University: 141–162. doi:10.1080/00223340903142108. JSTOR 40346712. OCLC 4648099874. S2CID 142362747.
- Newbury, Colin W. (March 1973). "Resistance and Collaboration in French Polynesia: the Tahitian War: 1844–7". The Journal of the Polynesian Society. 82 (1). Wellington: The Polynesian Society: 5–27. JSTOR 20704899. OCLC 5544738080. Archived from the original on 27 January 2019.
- Newbury, Colin W. (1980). Tahiti Nui: Change and Survival in French Polynesia, 1767–1945 (PDF). Honolulu: University Press of Hawaii. hdl:10125/62908. ISBN 978-0-8248-8032-3. OCLC 1053883377. Archived (PDF) from the original on 10 November 2019.
- Newbury, Colin W.; Darling, Adam J. (December 1967). "Te Hau Pahu Rahi: Pomare II and the Concept of Interisland Government in Eastern Polynesia". The Journal of the Polynesian Society. 76 (4). Wellington: The Polynesian Society: 477–514. JSTOR 20704508. OCLC 6015244633. Archived from the original on 31 January 2019.
- Oliver, Douglas L. (1974). Ancient Tahitian Society. Honolulu: University of Hawaii Press. doi:10.2307/j.ctvp2n5ds. hdl:1885/114907. ISBN 978-0-8248-8453-6. OCLC 1126284798. S2CID 165869849.
- Olson, James Stuart; Shadle, Robert (1991). Historical Dictionary of European Imperialism. New York: Greenwood Publishing Group. ISBN 978-0-313-26257-9. OCLC 21950673. Archived from the original on 23 December 2019.
- Perkins, Edward T. (1854). Na Motu, or, Reef-Rovings in the South Seas: a Narrative of Adventures at the Hawaiian, Georgian and Society Islands. New York: Pudney & Russell. OCLC 947055236.
- Russell, Samuel (1935). Tahiti and French Oceania: A Book of Reliable Information for the Traveller, the Sportsman, the Yachtsman, and the Resident in the South Seas. Sydney: Pacific Publications. OCLC 613072669.
- Saura, Bruno (2015). "Remembrance of the Colonial Past in the French Islands of the Pacific: Speeches, Representations, and Commemorations". The Contemporary Pacific. 27 (2, Special Issue: Decolonization, Language, and Identity: The Francophone Islands of the Pacific). Honolulu: University of Hawaii Press: 337–368. doi:10.1353/cp.2015.0036. hdl:10125/42538. JSTOR 24809936. OCLC 7973864301. S2CID 162013731.
- Scarr, Deryck (2001). A History of the Pacific Islands: Passages through Tropical Time. Richmond: Curzon. ISBN 978-1-136-83796-8. OCLC 1050558480.
- Scholefield, Guy Hardy (1919). "Tahiti, the Missionary Kingdom". The Pacific, Its Past and Future: And the Policy of the Great Powers from the Eighteenth Century. London: J. Murray. pp. 5–32. ISBN 9780722275887. OCLC 503455053.
- Teissier, Raoul (1978). "Chefs et notables des Établissements Français de l'Océanie au temps du protectorat: 1842–1850". Bulletin de la Société des Études Océaniennes (in French) (202). Papeete: Société des Études Océaniennes. OCLC 9510786. Archived from the original on 25 April 2018.
- Toullelan, Pierre-Yves (1990). "Le colonialisme triomphant: Tahiti et la IIIe République". La France et le Pacifique. Bibliothèque d'histoire d'outre-mer. Études, 10 (in French). 10 (1). Paris: Société française d'histoire d'outre-mer: 157–186. OCLC 24278332. Archived from the original on 28 December 2019.
- Zielinski, Helen (1973). A Critique of the De Jarnac Convention 1847 (PDF) (Thesis). Adelaide: Department of History, University of Adelaide. OCLC 222745702. Archived (PDF) from the original on 23 December 2019.
