= Tuarii =

- Queen of Raiatea and Tahaa
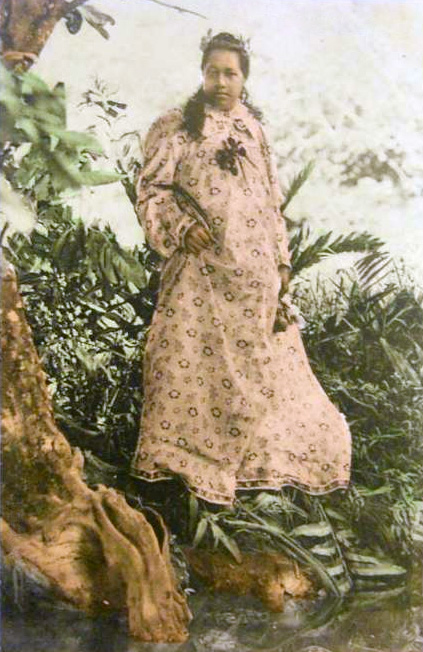
- Photograph by Lucien Gauthier
- Reign: 1887/1888 – 1896
- Predecessor: Tamatoa VI
- Died: 1911
- House: House of Tamatoa
- Father: Tahitoe
- Religion: Protestantism

Tuarii or Tūari'i (died 1911) was the queen regnant of Raiatea and Tahaa in the Leeward Islands of the Society Islands, part of present-day French Polynesia. She was the last monarch of the kingdom of Raiatea-Tahaa from 1887/1888 to 1897 before the conquest and annexation of the islands to France.

Tuarii was born into the ruling family of Raiatea. Her father was King Tahitoe and her sister Queen Tehauroa. A succession dispute gave the throne to a female-line cousin Tamatoa VI who submitted to French rule in 1888. In response, she and the minor chief Teraupo'o led a resistance government during the Raiatean rebellion (1887–1897) against the French. She unsuccessfully attempted to enlist the diplomatic support of the British by offering the islands to Queen Victoria and traveling to the British-controlled Cook Islands. The British refused to intervene. The rebellion ended with the surrender of Tuarii and her followers and the defeat and capture of Teraupo'o in 1897. She was pensioned off by the French colonial government and died in 1911.

== Family ==
Tuarii was a younger daughter of King Tahitoe of Raiatea and Tahaa who ruled from 1871 to 1881. Her grandfather Hihipa Tahitoe was the son of Vete'a-ra'i U'uru, the chief of Opoa, and grandson of King Tamatoa II of Raiatea from whom her family claimed the right to the throne of Raiatea.

In 1880, King Tahitoe accepted the provisional protectorate by French commissioner Isidore Chessé. After this, Tahitoe was deposed by his subjects for requesting the protectorate and his other daughter and successor Queen Tehauroa unsuccessfully attempted to enlist the protection of the British to preserve the independence of Raiatea in accordance with the Jarnac Convention of 1847. After Tehauroa's death in 1884, a civil war nearly broke out between two rivals for the throne. To avoid French intervention a female-line cousin and a junior member of the royal family of Huahine was installed as King Tamatoa VI.

== Reign ==
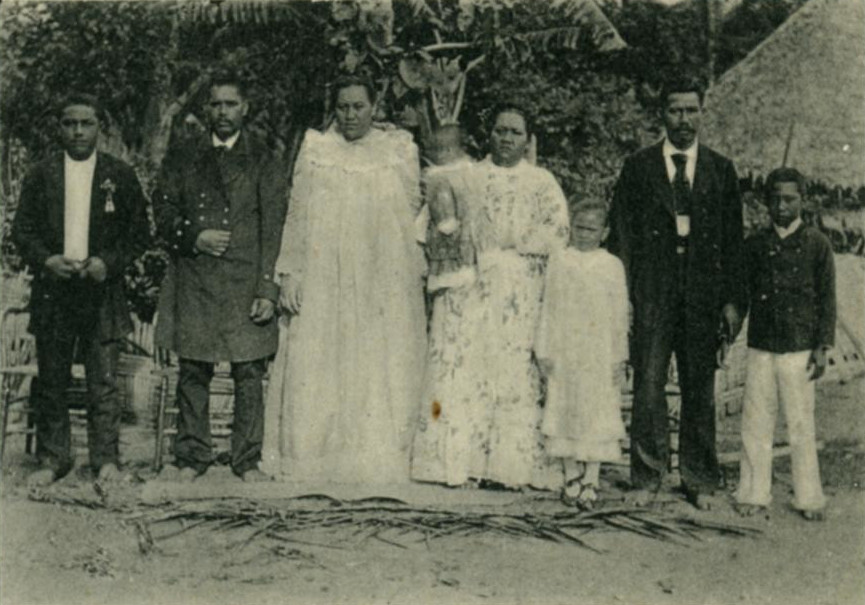
Tuarii and her family at Avera, c. 1895

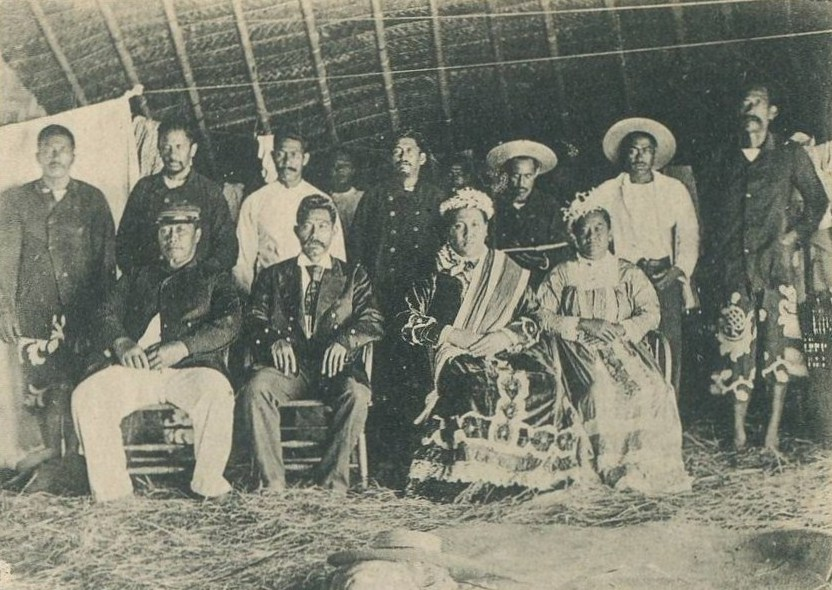
Queen Tuarii and her council of chiefs at Avera, c. 1895

On 16 March 1888, the French annexed Raiatea and Tahaa after formal negotiation between Great Britain and France ended the 1847 Convention. In either 1887 or 1888, Tuarii was installed on the throne by the rebel chief Teraupo'o in opposition to King Tamatoa VI who had sided with the French. Her government and the resistance movement was centered at the village of Avera, located on the eastern coast of Raiatea. (Note: Tuarii was also known as the "Queen of Avera", often in quotes.) The Raiateans unsuccessfully appealed to Robert Teesdale Simons, the British Consul in Tahiti, for assistance and offered their country to Queen Victoria or the "Great White Queen". In 1895, Queen Tuarii traveled to the British protectorate of Rarotonga in the Cook Islands to seek help from the British Resident Frederick Moss who refused to meet with her.

The French appointed Governor Gustave Gallet to suppress the rebellion. Gallet had previous experience with suppressing the 1878 Kanak rebellion in New Caledonia. In 1896, two French warships, the cruiser Duguay-Trouin and the transporter Aube, arrived from New Caledonia with two hundred French soldiers to quell the native resistance. The invasion force was further reinforced with a company of Tahitian volunteers. On 27 December 1896, Governor Gallet attempted to parley with the rebels to avoid bloodshed. He set an ultimatum for the rebels to surrender by 1 January 1897. The rebel government at Avera under Queen Tuarii and 1700 rebels reluctantly surrendered.

Teraupo'o and the rebels of Tahaa and the district of Tevaitoa refused the call to surrender and the rebellion ended after the rebel chief's capture after two months of guerilla warfare on 16 February 1897. The casualties of the six-week campaign were nearly fifty deaths mainly on the side of the Raiateans.

== Later life and death ==
Tuarii was offered an annual pension of 2,400 francs, but the French refused her request for pensions for members of her family. The French governor wrote: "Je vous laisse d’ailleurs le soin, si vous le jugez convenable, de prévenir Tuarii que si elle nous crée la moindre difficulté sa pension lui est retirée, car elle ne la doit qu’à notre extrême bienveillance en sa faveur" or "I leave it to you, if you find it appropriate, to warn Tuarii that if she creates any sort of difficulty, her pension will be withdrawn, given that she is only allowed it thanks to our extreme benevolence towards her".

She died in 1911.

== Ancestry ==
Raiatea family tree

Tamatoa I (or II)
Bora Bora family
Ari'ima'o	Rofa'i
Puni; Ariʻi Rahi of Bora Bora, Raiatea and Taha'a	Pōmare Dynasty of Tahiti	Mau'a	Tamatoa II (or III)
Teu; Ariʻi of Pare-Arue; Ariʻi of the Porionuʻu	Tetupaia i Hauiri	Mato	Vete'ara'i 'U'uru; Ariʻi rahi of Opoa
Pōmare I King of Tahiti	Tura'iari'i Ehevahine	Tamatoa III (or IV); Ari'i Rahi of Raiatea	Tahitoe Hihipo
Tapoa I Ariʻi Rahi of Bora Bora, Raiatea and Taha'a	Pōmare II; King of Tahiti	Teriʻitoʻoterai; Teremoemoe	Teriitaria II; Queen of Huahine	Teihotu Ta'avea	Moeore, Tamatoa IV; King of Raiatea	Tahitoe; King of Raiatea
Tapoa II; King of Bora Bora and Taha'a	Pōmare IV; Queen of Tahiti	Ari'ifa'aite	Ariimate Teururai; King of Huahine	Tehaapapa II; Queen of Huahine	Tehauroa; Queen of Raiatea	Tuarii; Queen of Raiatea
Pōmare V King of Tahiti	Teri'imaevarua II; Queen of Bora Bora	Tamatoa V King of Raiatea	Moe a Ma'i	Tamatoa VI; King of Raiatea
Princess Teriiourumaona _{Tahitian Heir as Pōmare VI}	Princess Teriivaetua	Teri'imaevarua III; Queen of Bora Bora	Princess Teriinavahoroa	Princess 'Aimata	Prince Tamatoa

Notes:

The numbering of the Tamatoa varies. An ancestor of the Tamatoa line named Fa'aniti is often counted as "Tamatoa I" and Moeore is sometime not considered Tamatoa IV.

References

- Cadousteau, Mai-Arii (1987). "CHAPITRE VIII: AHU'URA FILLE DU ROI MAI III". Bulletin de la Société des Études Océaniennes. 20 (239–240). Papeete: Société des Études Océaniennes: 45–50. OCLC 9510786.
- Henry, Teuira; Orsmond, John Muggridge (1928). Ancient Tahiti. Vol. 48. Honolulu: Bernice Pauahi Bishop Museum. pp. 247–272. OCLC 3049679.
- Newbury, Colin W.; Darling, Adam J. (December 1967). "Te Hau Pahu Rahi: Pomare II and the Concept of Interisland Government in Eastern Polynesia". The Journal of the Polynesian Society. 76 (4). Wellington: The Polynesian Society: 477–514. JSTOR 20704508. OCLC 6015244633.
- Orsmond, John Muggridge; Smith, S. Percy (March 1893). "The Genealogy of the Pomare Family of Tahiti, from the Papers of the Rev. J. M. Orsmond. With Notes Thereon by S. Percy Smith". The Journal of the Polynesian Society. 2 (1). Wellington: The Polynesian Society: 25–43. JSTOR 20701269. OCLC 5544732839.
- Teissier, Raoul (1978). "Chefs et notables des Établissements Français de l'Océanie au temps du protectorat: 1842–1850". Bulletin de la Société des Études Océaniennes, Issue 202. Papeete: Société des Études Océaniennes. OCLC 9510786.

== See also ==
- French Polynesia
- Queen Mamea
- Annexation of the Leeward Islands
- List of monarchs of Raiatea
- List of monarchs who lost their thrones in the 19th century

== Bibliography ==
- Chesneau, Joseph (August 1928). "Notes sur Huahine et autres Iles-Sous-le-Vent". Bulletin de la Société des Études Océaniennes (in French) (26). Papeete: Société des Études Océaniennes: 81–98. OCLC 9510786.
- Dodd, Edward (1983). The Rape of Tahiti. New York: Dodd, Mead & Company. ISBN 978-0-396-08114-2. OCLC 8954158.
- Flude, Anthony G. (March 2012). "Manuscript XXIII: A Raiatean Petition for American Protection". The Journal of Pacific History. 47 (1). Canberra: Australian National University: 111–121. doi:10.1080/00223344.2011.632982. OCLC 785915823. S2CID 159847026.
- Gleizal, Christian. "Evènements de Raiatea et arrestation de Teraupo". Histoire de l'Assemblée de la Polynésie française. Archived from the original on 4 March 2016.
- Gonschor, Lorenz Rudolf (August 2008). Law as a Tool of Oppression and Liberation: Institutional Histories and Perspectives on Political Independence in Hawaiʻi, Tahiti Nui/French Polynesia and Rapa Nui (PDF) (MA thesis). Honolulu: University of Hawaii at Manoa. hdl:10125/20375. OCLC 798846333. Archived from the original (PDF) on 2 January 2020.
- Hall, Douglas B.; Osborne, Lord Albert (1901). Sunshine and Surf: A Year's Wanderings in the South Seas. London: Adam and Charles Black. OCLC 499468568.
- Hänni, Eugène (1908). Trois ans chez les Canaques. Odyssée d'un Neuchâtelois autour du monde (in French). Lausanne: Payot. OCLC 20460045.
- Huguenin, Paul (1902). Raiatea La Sacrée: Iles Sous Le Vent de Tahiti (Océanie Francaise) Avec 24 Planches En Couleur, Reproduction Des Aquarelles Originales de l'Auteur (in French). Neuchatel: P. Attinger. OCLC 69497948.
- Layton, Monique (2015). The New Arcadia: Tahiti's Cursed Myth. Victoria, BC: FriesenPress. ISBN 978-1-4602-6860-5. OCLC 930600657.
- Lovett, Richard (1899). The History of the London Missionary Society, 1795–1895. London: H. Frowde. OCLC 221934284.
- McArthur, Norma (1967). "Leeward Islands". Island Populations of the Pacific (PDF). Canberra: Australian National University Press. pp. 265–279. OCLC 1647169.
- Meltz, Renaud (2013). "Du protectorat à l'annexion: La lente " pacification " des Îles Sous-le-Vent (Polynésie), 1880–1897". Monde(s) (in French). 4 (2). Rennes: Presses Universitaires de Rennes: 233–250. doi:10.3917/mond.132.0233. ISBN 9782200928629. OCLC 7293447471.
- Newbury, Colin W. (1956). The Administration of French Oceania, 1842–1906 (PDF) (PhD thesis). Canberra: A Thesis submitted for the degree of Doctor of Philosophy in the Australian National University. hdl:1885/9609. OCLC 490766020.
- Newbury, Colin W. (1980). Tahiti Nui: Change and Survival in French Polynesia, 1767–1945 (PDF). Honolulu: University Press of Hawaii. hdl:10125/62908. ISBN 978-0-8248-8032-3. OCLC 1053883377. Archived from the original (PDF) on 10 November 2019.
- Saura, Bruno (2015). "Remembrance of the Colonial Past in the French Islands of the Pacific: Speeches, Representations, and Commemorations". The Contemporary Pacific. 27 (2, SPECIAL ISSUE: Decolonization, Language, and Identity: The Francophone Islands of the Pacific). Honolulu: University of Hawaii Press: 337–368. doi:10.1353/cp.2015.0036. hdl:10125/42538. JSTOR 24809936. OCLC 7973864301. S2CID 162013731.

Regnal titles
Preceded by Tamatoa VI	Queen of Raiatea-Tahaa; 1887/1888–1897	Monarchy abolished
