= Queen Mamea =

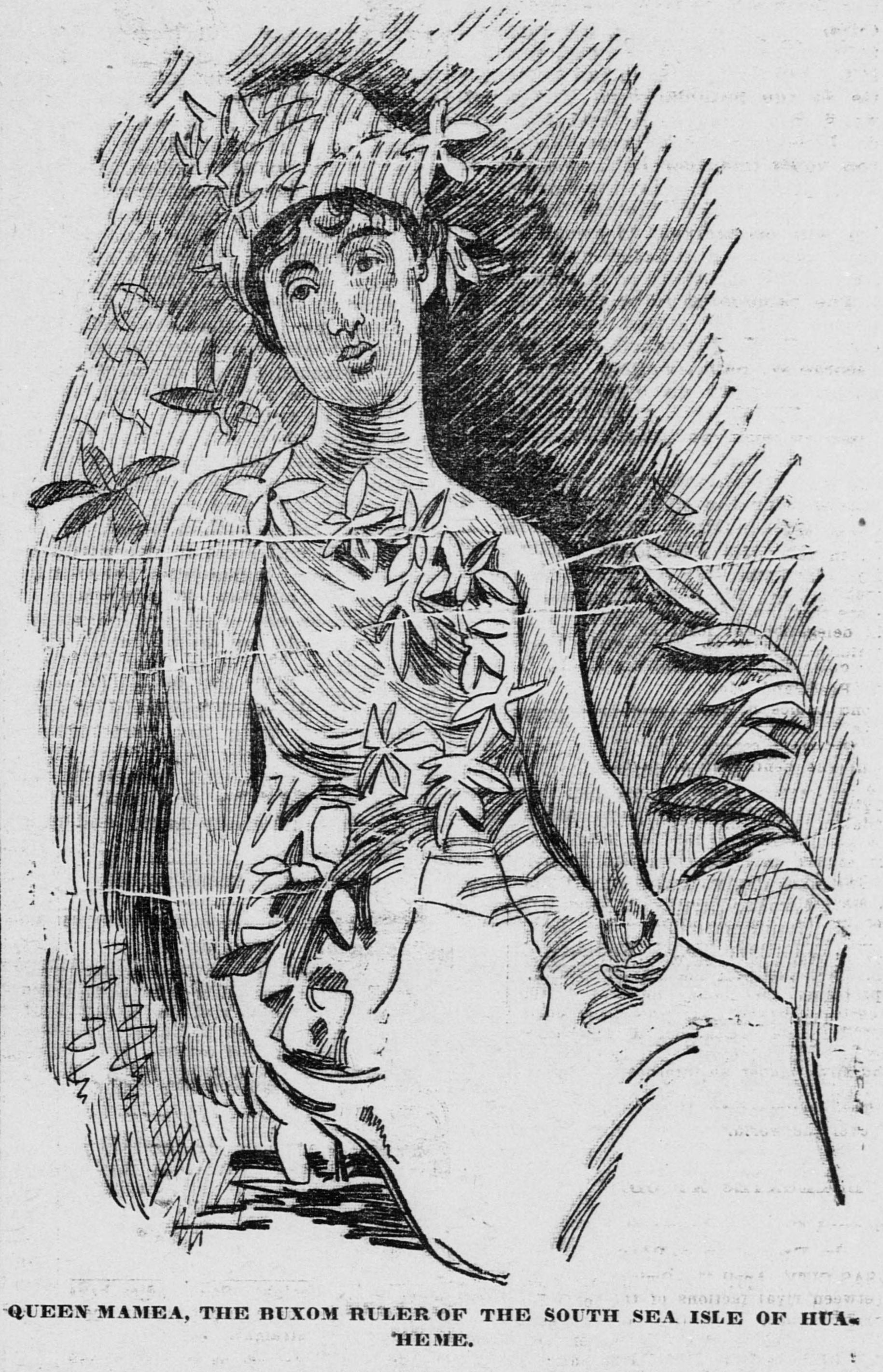
Mamea depicted in an 1896 US newspaper

Queen Mamea (before c. 1870 – after 1896) was the name given to a ruler of Raiatea and Huahine in the Society Islands by English speaking European and American newspapers during the annexation of the Leeward Islands.

According to erroneous newspaper accounts, she ruled around 1,000 subjects and her reign began in the early to mid 1870s. In 1890 she successfully resisted an armed French annexation by withdrawing to the interior of her kingdom and waiting for the French to run out of supplies. Mamea repeated the tactics during a second invasion of 1896 and appealed to other foreign powers for assistance, including offering her kingdom as a state to the United States. She was captured in a surprise attack and granted the French control over her lands before being replaced by a new chief.

== Life summarized in newspaper accounts ==
=== Early reign ===
Mamea had been queen of Raiatea and Huahine in the Society Islands since the early to mid 1870s. She was described as the "handsomest woman in the South Seas" with strong features and hair that she styled upwards.

Mamea had around 1,000 subjects and was a cousin of Oscar Tomare, prince of the island of Bora Bora. Mamea proposed marriage to a herder by the name of Macello and offered him a position as a chief but she was refused and Macello married a mixed race Tahitian girl. Mamea brought an end to the traditional practice of cannibalism on her islands. The French, who occupied nearby Tahiti, desired Mamea's realm as did the German and British Empires. A French invasion of 1890 was successfully resisted after Mamea withdrew her warriors to a series of canyons in the island's interior where she had stockpiled several years of food supplies. The besieging French forces were forced to withdraw after their own supplies ran low.

=== 1896 French annexation ===
French forces made renewed attempts to annex Mamea's kingdom in 1896 with the governor of Tahiti declaring "we will annex the island and you must submit". A French fleet destroyed each of the queen's coastal settlements and captured her palace. Mamea withdrew to the woods and hills of the interior with her 500 warriors, said to be the fiercest in the South Seas, and 300 women. They carried with them the idol of their god Tāne. In a retaliatory raid on the French missionaries of Uturoa in northern Raiatea Mamea's forces killed several traders.

In March 1896 Mamea sent word via an American merchant that she wished her kingdom to be admitted as a state within the United States. Mamea sought assistance from the British resident at Rarotonga in the Cook Islands and was advised to submit to the French. Shortly thereafter Mamea was captured in a surprise attack and agreed to grant France control of the island, its shipping and permission to establish a coaling station. The British opposed the deal and requested that France restore the island to Mamea's control; this was refused and Mamea was replaced by a new chief. Mamea was compensated by the payment of 4,000 francs. (~23,000 US Dollars in 2015)

By June 1896 Mamea's former subjects were flying the British flag and claiming to be under the protection of Queen Victoria. The French protested that the island was in their possession and brought the British consul from Papeete who advised the islanders that they were not permitted to use the flag. This was ignored and French forces shot down at least one flagstaff, but struggled to keep up with the islanders who simply raised more. Inevitably, the islands ended up under de facto French rule following the annexation of the Leeward Islands.

== Historic female rulers ==
The fact of Queen Mamea's existence is convoluted by misunderstanding of Tahitian history and culture during the 1880s and 1890s. The life of two historical female monarchs in the 1880s and 1890s possibly influenced the character of her: Queen Tuarii of Raiatea and Queen Teuhe of Huahine who actively resisted French rule. The two islands were never politically united under one ruler before their annexation to France. Numerous other women ruled the Society Islands during the 19th-century. Raiatea had two female rulers: Tehauroa (r. 1881–1884) and the aforementioned Tuarii (r. 1888–1897). Huahine had four queens: Teriitaria II (r. 1815–1852), Tehaapapa II (r. 1868–1893), the aforementioned Teuhe (r. 1888–1890), and Tehaapapa III (r. 1893–1895). Bora Bora had two female rulers: Teriimaevarua II (r. 1860–1873) and Teriimaevarua III (r. 1873–1895).
