= Tumu-te-ana-oa =

In Cook Islands mythology, Tumu-te-ana-oa was the female personification of Echo. She was the fourth child of Vari, the primordial mother goddess. Both her name and the land she occupied had to do with the production of echoes. Her name means "the cause (tumu) of the call or voice (oa) heard from caves (ana)". The term oa is used by people when calling out to evoke an echo. Her land was Te Parae-tea, which Gill translates, "The-hollow-gray-rocks". Mamae (Gill's informant) gives no more detail, but Gill recounts that Tumu-te-ana-oa frequented the caves of Mangaia, where she was seen by Rangi, one of the first inhabitants. The cave in which she was first seen was Aitu-mamaoa.
