= Tu-metua =

Mythological character

In Cook Islands mythology, Tu-metua was the sixth child and most beloved daughter of the mother goddess, Vari. Tu-metua lived in Te-enua-te-ki "The-mute-land" (enua, "land" + te, used as a negative, + ki, "to speak"). This was a place said to have no spoken language, but communication only by signs—such as nods, raised eyebrows, grimaces, and smiles. Gill states that Vari and Tu-metua lived together in Enua-te-ki, but he was in error in treating Te Aiti as a descriptive word and not as Vari's own distinct land. Mamae's native text (Gill's informant), however, shows that the two lands were close together. It also explains the meaning of Tu-metua's name, which differs from Gill's translation as "Stick-to-the-parent".
