= Varima-te-takere =

Cook Islander mythological being

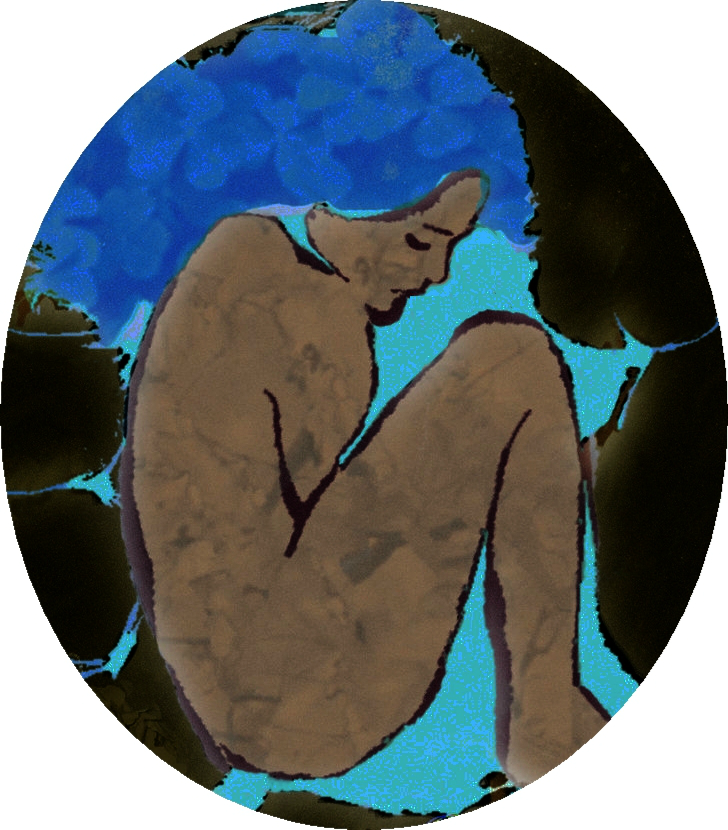
The goddess Varima-te-takere in her womb-like domain in Avaiki.

In Cook Islands mythology, Varima-te-takere ("goddess of the beginning") also called Vari (/ˈvɑːri/ VAH-ree), was the primordial mother of the gods and mortals.

According to Gill, Vari, a female spirit or demon of flesh and blood, was admitted to the lowest depth of the interior of Avaiki, a place described as resembling a vast hollow coconut shell. Such is the narrowness of her territory that her knees and chin touch, no other position is possible. Her name in full, Vari-ma-te-takere, Gill translates as "The very beginning". The word vari, however, also means "mud", and, taken in conjunction with takere (canoe bottom or keel), the name literally means "The mud at the bottom"; suggesting the mud on the bottom of Avaiki. Vari is the mud of taro swamps and connotes potential plant growth. As applied to a female, it means menstruation. It conveys a connection with the female womb and the origin of human growth. The following passage from a dramatic song of creation (circa 1790) mentions Vari:

But we have no father whatever:
Vari alone made us.
That home of Vari is
The very narrowest of all!
Vari's home is in the narrowest of spaces,
A goddess feeding on raw taro
At appointed periods of worship!
Thy mother, Vatea, is self-existent.

Vari was very anxious for progeny. At various times she created six children, three bits of flesh were plucked from each side of her body, and moulded into human form. These six are the primary gods of the universe. Yet no marae or image was ever sacred to them, nor was any offering made to them. These gods are: Vatea (or Avatea), the father of gods and men; Tinirau, lord of the seas; Tango, lord of the birds; Tumu-te-ana-oa, an echo of the rocks; Raka, lord of the winds; and Tu-metua, a beloved daughter whom Vari kept close to her in Avaiki. Tu-metua (or Tu-papa) was the tutelary deity of the island of Moorea, and the fourteenth night in every moon was sacred to her.
