= Raka (mythology) =

God of winds in Cook Islands myths

In Cook Islands mythology, Raka (Trouble) was the god of winds and storms. He was the fifth child of the Great Mother, Vari. Raka found a congenial home in Moana-Irakau (Deep ocean). According to Gill, Raka received from Vari a great basket, in which contained the hidden winds, as well as the knowledge of many useful inventions. The children of Raka are the numerous winds and storms which distress mankind. Each child was assigned a hole in the horizon through which he blew at pleasure. Gill's informant, Mamae, gives his wife and children but not the parents of the wife, Takatipa; whoever they were, they formed additional contemporaries of Vari.
