= Havaii =

Spelling variant of Hawaii

Havaii is one of a half dozen or so variant spellings of Hawaii that can be found across all three points of Polynesia. Havaii or Hawai'i refers to the ancient name for both Ra'iatea and Fakarava, both in French Polynesia. Common to all monarchial systems, island names changed by royal order or common assent, according to historic events. Other variants include Savai'i, Avaiki and Hawaiki, with the names attaining a political as well as cultural significance in postcolonial times.

== Usage ==
Unlike Hawai'i, Havai'i spelled with an okina is simply a misspelling. Although "Hawaii" is the anglicized spelling used throughout the rest of the United States of America, Hawai'i, spelled with an okina between the Is, is the spelling used by most local Hawaiian people. An apostrophe is commonly used in the place of an okina, due to the lack of the symbol on most keyboards. Language workers also know this apostrophe is actually reversed, a glottal stop, signifying a verbal chop between vowels. Few web pages recognize this special character, with Microsoft releasing a Maori character font in 2003, although it does not address the glottal stop used by Maori outside of Aotearoa, New Zealand. Maori in Avaiki, Cook Islands, and in Rapanui, Easter Island; Maohi in Tahiti and other parts of French Polynesia; and Maoli in the islands of Hawai'i all treat consonants differently.
