= Tapairu =

Elves in Mangaia mythology

In the mythology of Mangaia in the Cook Islands, the Tapairu are elves or fairies. They are the daughters of Miru and the sisters of Tau-Titi.

== Names ==
The word Tapairu means "fairest of the fair." The four names of the Tapairu are:

1. Kumutonga-i-te-po, which means Kumutonga-of-the-night.
2. Karaia-i-te-ata, which means Karaia-the-shadowy
3. Té-rauara, which means Pandanus-leaf
4. Te-poro, which means Point

== Family ==
The Tapairu are named after the four daughters of Miru, the deformed goddess of the underworld. They were the brothers and sisters of Tau-Titi. They were also associated with the worship of the god Tane.

== Traditions ==
It was said that when humans danced to celebrate Tau-Titi, the Tapairu would be summoned to the northern part of Mangaia. They would appear at sunset, near a stream called Auparu, which means soft dew. After bathing in Auparu, the Tapairu would climb a nearby hill, so that they could watch the humans dance.

In addition to the dance of Tau-Titi, the Tapairu are also associated with the Crab dance, which took place by moonlight. When appearing in association of the Crab dance, the Tapairu appeared in association with the streams Vaipau and Vaikaute. Furthermore, they are associated with dances dedicated to Tane, which involved banana leaves.

Following these dancing rituals, once the morning arrived, the Tapairu would vanish from the island, returning to Avaiki.

== Cultural influence ==
In the late 19th century, Tapairu was a popular name for girls in the eastern Pacific Islands. It means fairest of the fair.
