= Tango (mythology) =

In Cook Islands mythology, Tango (Support) was the third child of the primordial mother goddess, Varima-te-takere. He was assigned to live at Enua-kura (The land of red parrot feathers). According to William Wyatt Gill's tribal historian colleague, Mamae, Tango was the progenitor of a skilled fishing family. That the six grandsons of Tango were good workers is shown in the native text. The enclosure (akeke) for fish mentioned in a chant has not been retained in the local culture of the people.
