= Miru (goddess) =

Polynesian goddess

Miru (Note: also known as Milu, Meru, and Mirukura in Mangaia folklore also known as Mery in Hawaiian folklore also known as Muru on Rarotonga) is a goddess in the Polynesian mythology who lives in Avaiki. She is known to torture and eat the souls of humans who fall into the underworld. In Hawaiian folklore, Miru is a male chief who was swept into the underworld.

== Description ==
In Mangaia folklore, Miru is known as a deformed goddess of the underworld, known as Hawaiki. She is said to only have one breast, with the other being cut off. Similarly, while one leg and one arm were pristine, another arm and leg had been cut off. After humans die, they are sent to the domain of Miru, where she cooks their souls in her oven and eaten at her leisure. In her domain, there is also a lake which ensures that anyone who swims in it drowns. This is because the lake causes anguish and makes anyone swimming in it endlessly thirsty. Before eating people, she catches them in a net. She also drugs them with kava.

Miru lives in Hawaiki, which is said to lay in the west in Hawaiian folklore. Other gods live in Hawaiki with Miru. They include Kurukoekoea, Kaitoa, Mākutu, Mutu, Rapawhenua, Tāwhere, Tutangtakino, and Akaanga, who assists her in Mangaia and Rarotonga folklore.

Miru appears in Hawaiian folklore as a ruling male chief who had gotten swept away into the underworld. After this, he replaced the existing god of the dead, Manua. On Rarotonga, Muru is described as a male god with similar cannibalistic tendencies as his female counterpart on Mangaia. He comes from a small area between Avarua and Arorangi.

In Mangareva folklore, Miru is described as a goddess of the night world.

Miru also appears in Māori mythology in New Zealand as the one of the three goddesses of death. Her abode is called Tatau-o-te-pō, which means door-of-the-night, at the foot of Cape Reinga, where dead spirits would leap into the underworld. this is described in songs.

=== Family ===
Miru has four daughters, known as the Tapairu. Their names are Kumutonga-i-te-po, Karaia-i-te-ata, Té-rauara, and Te-poro. She has one son, named Tau-Titi. In French Polynesia, Toa-Miru, a goddess of childbirth, is also believed to be her daughter.

== Stories ==
There is a story of the hero Tekauae, known as the-chin, who descended into the underworld in order to protect souls from Miru. Using the kernel of a coconut, he descended to the underworld, where he met Miru.

Miru presented Tekauae with a bowl of food, but when he went to eat it, he realized it was full of centipedes. He used the coconut kernel to pretend to eat the centipedes, shocking Miru. She then directed him to dive into a lake, which drowned everyone who attempted to swim in it. When he didn't, Miru became frustrated and told Tekauae to return to the mortal world, as long as he wouldn't tell the other humans about her hideous form. He complied, but still told people about what would wait them if they went to the underworld.

The Māori people have another story about a tribal chief, Rongomai, who visited the underworld. In that story, he brought back charms, songs, and games. Two of his companions, Ngo and Kewa, were sacrificed for this cause.

Miru is also mentioned within a poem by Alistair Te Ariki Campbell, written during his travels to the Cook Islands. Although briefly, his mentions of Miru tell of the belief that upon entering Savaiki, the souls of the dead could be trapped by Miru and her assistants, "stupefying" the souls on kava and hanging them on trees to be devoured.
