= List of monarchs of Raiatea =

Flag of the Kingdom of Raiatea

Map of the Kingdom of Raiatea

The Polynesian island of Raiatea, in the Society Islands, was a kingdom from the 18th century until its annexation by France in 1888. After Tamatoa VI's abdication, a rebel government was set up by chief Teraupo'o with Queen Tuarii as its figurehead until French colonial forces ended the native resistance and exiled the leaders in 1897. The island is now a part of French Polynesia.

== Monarchs of Raiatea ==
Portrait	Name	Birth–Death	Reign start	Reign end
	Tamatoa III	1757 – 10 July 1831	1820	10 July 1831
	Tamatoa IV	1797–1857	10 July 1831	19 August 1857
	Tamatoa V	23 September 1842 – 30 September 1881	19 August 1857	8 February 1871
	Tahitoe	1808 – 13 April 1881	8 February 1871	13 April 1881
	Tehauroa	1830 – 18 March 1884	13 April 1881	18 March 1884
	Tamatoa VI	1853 – 15 September 1905	25 January 1885	18 March 1888
	Tuarii (Note: Rebel government under Teraupo'o.)	Died 1911	1888	1897

== See also ==
- List of monarchs of Tahiti
- List of monarchs of Huahine
- List of monarchs of Bora Bora
- List of colonial and departmental heads of French Polynesia
- President of French Polynesia
