= Tau-Titi =

Tau-Titi, also known as Tautiki, is a god in Mangaia mythology. He is associated with human dance rituals and is sometimes called the patron god of dancing. Tau-Titi is the daughter of Miru and the brother of the Tapairu. Tau-Titi is also associated with a form of dance on Mangaia, and his name is sometimes used as a synonym for dance on Mangaia.

== Family ==
Tau-Titi lives in Avaiki. He is the son of Miru, the deformed goddess of the underworld. Miru is said to be very tenderly attached to Tau-Titi, such that she insisted on carrying his drinking water for him. Tau-Titi also had four sisters, known as the Tapairu.

== Ritual ==
Tau-Titi is the patron god of dancing. He presides over human dances, which are named after him. The Tau-Titi dance is sometimes done in silence. When the Tau-Titi dance is done, the Tapairu also emerge. Tau-Titi's dance is said to be graceful. It involves moving one's hands and feet simultaneously. This is contrasted against the Crab dance, which is said to have a disagreeable form, due to how the dance moves back and forth.
