= Franco-Tahitian War =

1844–1847 military conflict in modern-day French Polynesia

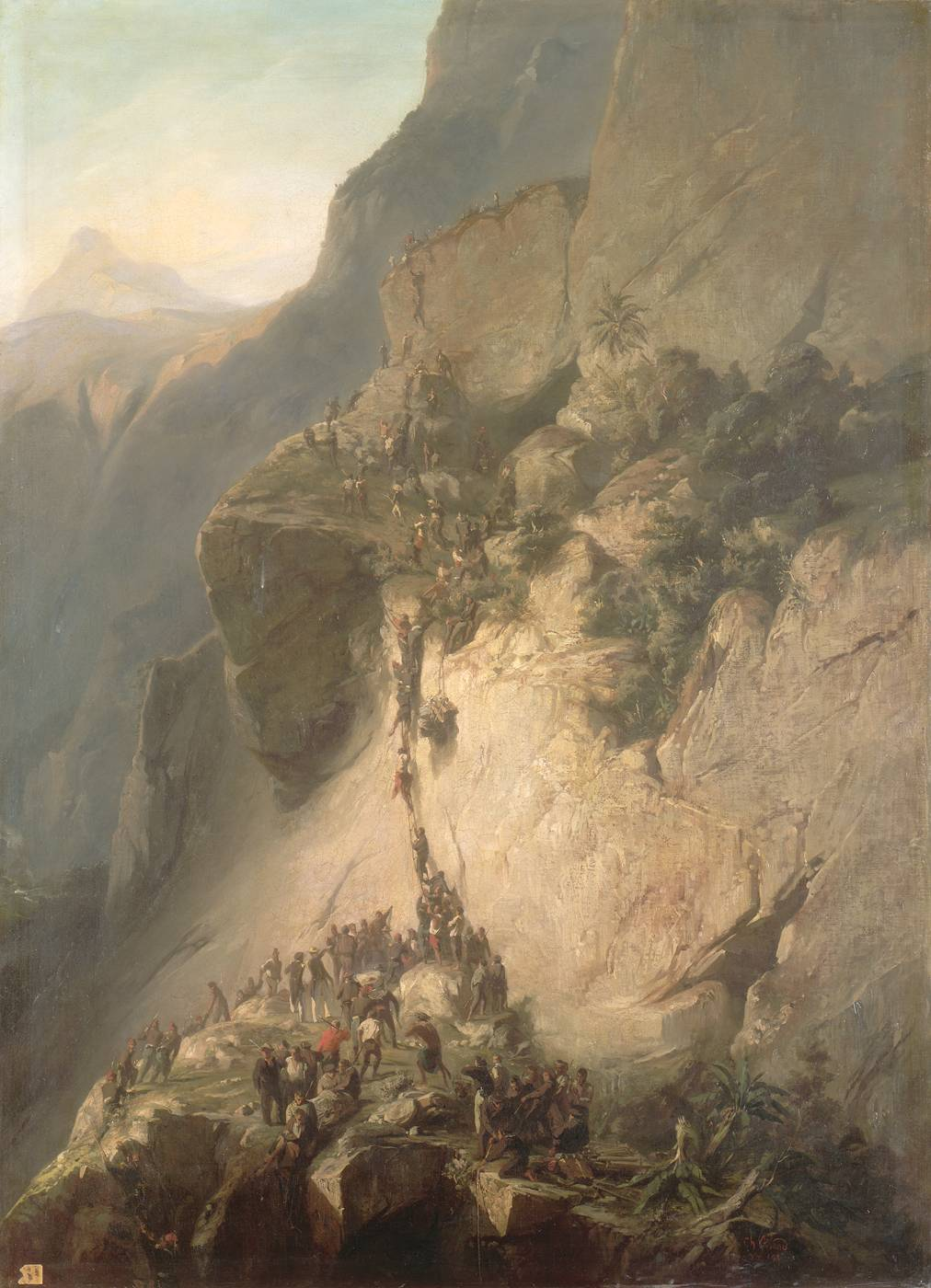
- Capture of Fort Fautahua in Tahiti, 17 December 1846; Sébastien Charles Giraud, 1857
| Date | 1844–1847 |
| Location | Society Islands |
| Result | French victory |

Belligerents
| France; Tahitian allies | Tahiti; Huahine (Raiatea) Raʻiātea–Tahaʻa; Bora Bora |

Commanders and leaders
| Abel du Petit-Thouars; Armand Bruat; Louis Bonard; Paraita; Tati; Hitoti | Pōmare IV; Teriitaria II; Tamatoa IV; Tapoa II; Utami; Fanaue; Maiʻo |

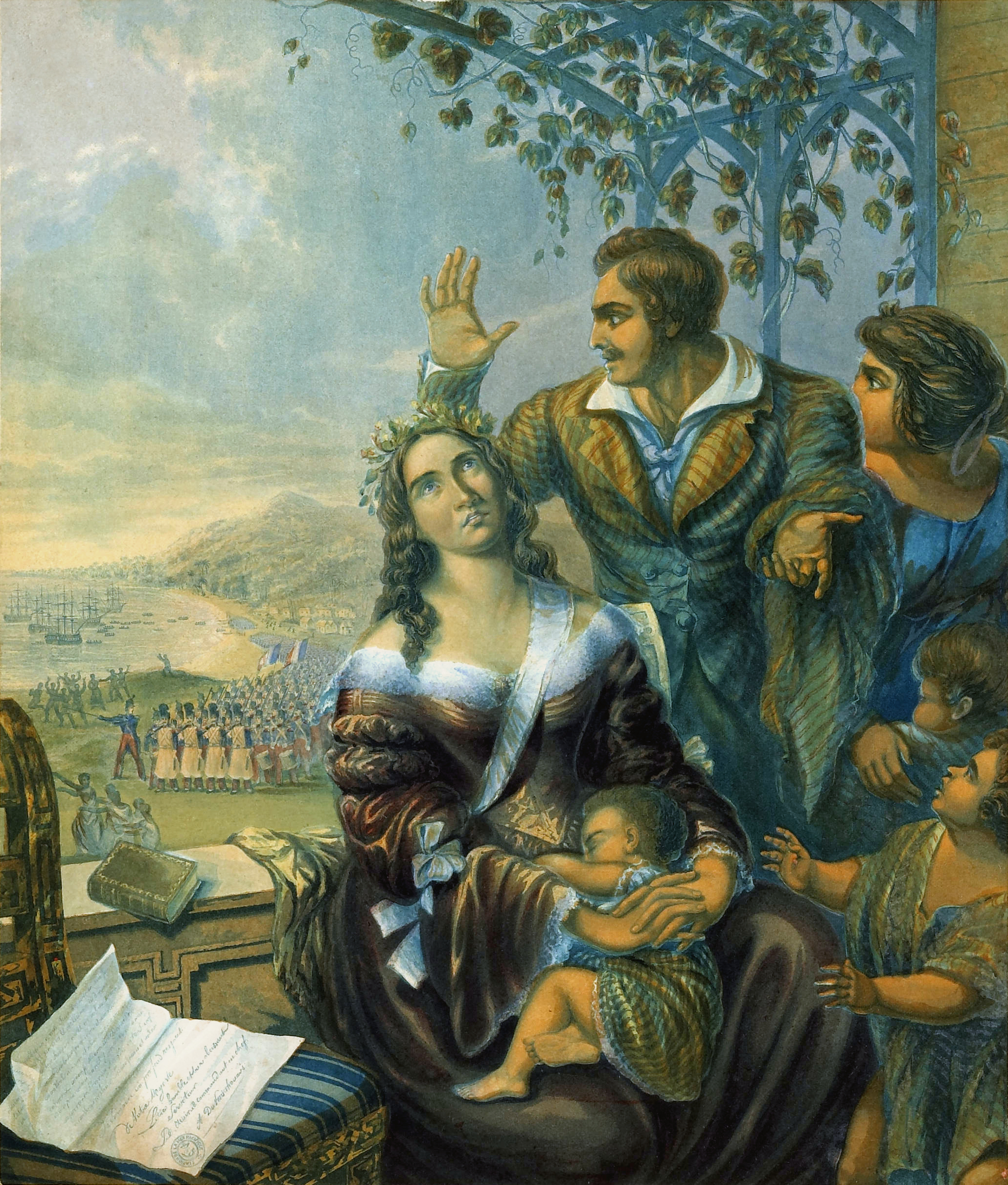
Pomare, Queen of Tahiti, the Persecuted Christian Surrounded by Her Family at the Afflictive Moment when the French Forces Were Landing, painting by LMS artist George Baxter, 1845.

The Franco-Tahitian War (French: Guerre franco-tahitienne) or French–Tahitian War (1844–1847) was a conflict between the Kingdom of France and the Kingdom of Tahiti and its allies in the South Pacific archipelago of the Society Islands in modern-day French Polynesia.

Tahiti was converted to Protestant Christianity by the London Missionary Society (LMS) in the early 19th century with the patronage of the Pōmare dynasty. Influenced by British missionary George Pritchard, Queen Pōmare IV expelled French Catholic missionaries from her kingdom in 1836 and incurred the ire of France. Between 1838 and 1842, French naval commander Abel Aubert du Petit-Thouars responded to French complaints of mistreatment and forced the queen and the Tahitian chiefs to sign over Tahiti as a protectorate. Pritchard and Pōmare IV attempted to resist French rule and to convince the British to intervene in favor of the Tahitians. These efforts were unsuccessful and led to the imprisonment of Pritchard and the deposition and voluntary exile of Pōmare IV to her relatives in neighboring Raʻiātea.

From 1844 to 1847, the French fought Tahitian forces on the main island of Tahiti. The technologically inferior Tahitians were no match for the French marines in the field and so relied on their superior knowledge of the island's mountainous interior to wage guerrilla warfare. The last native stronghold was captured in late 1846. On the second front, the French attempted to assert control over the three neighboring island kingdoms in the Leeward Islands. However, their efforts were thwarted by the defeat of the French against the forces of Queen Teriitaria II of Huahine in 1846. The British never intervened directly in the conflict but there was significant diplomatic pressure and tension between the two European powers. The war ended when Queen Pōmare agreed to return and rule under the French protectorate. France and Great Britain signed the Jarnac Convention, or Anglo-French Convention, of 1847, in which the two powers agreed to respect the independence of Queen Pōmare's allies in the Leeward Islands. These actions ultimately forestalled the end of Tahitian independence until the 1880s.

== Prelude ==
The Society Islands are subdivided into the Leeward Islands in the northwest and Windward Islands or Georgian Islands in the southeast. The Windward Islands include: Tahiti, Moorea, Mehetia, Tetiaroa, and Maiao. Politically, the Kingdom of Tahiti comprised all the Windward Islands except Maiao. It also held nominal sovereignty over the more distant Tuamotus archipelago and a few of the Austral Islands. By the mid-19th century the Leeward Islands was made up of three kingdoms: the Kingdom of Huahine and its dependency of Maiao (geographically part of the Windward Islands); the Kingdom of Raiatea-Tahaa; and the Kingdom of Bora Bora with its dependencies of Maupiti, Tupai, Maupihaa, Motu One, and Manuae.

Tahiti was converted to Protestant Christianity by the London Missionary Society (LMS) in the early 19th century. The Pōmare Dynasty, patrons of the British Protestant missionaries, established their rule over Tahiti and Moorea as part of the Kingdom of Tahiti. Western concepts of kingdoms and nation states were foreign to the native Tahitians or Maohi (Note: Maohi or Mā’ohi is the Tahitian language name for the indigenous Polynesian people of the Society Islands without association with the largest and most populous islands of Tahiti. Other English exonyms exist for the other islands as well including: the Raiatean of Raiatea, the Tahaan of Tahaa, the Moorean of Moorea, the Huahinean of Huahine, the Boraboran of Bora Bora and the Maupitian of Maupiti.) people who were divided into loosely defined tribal units and districts before European contact. The first Christian king, Pōmare II, headed the hau pahu rahi ("government of the great drum") or hau feti'i (“family government"), a traditional alliance of the inter-related chiefly families of the Society Islands. Christianity spread to the remaining islands after his conversion. He held nominal suzerainty over the other Society Islands as a loose alliance. This was later misinterpreted by Europeans as sovereignty or subjugation of the other islands to Tahiti.

In the 1830s, tensions between French naval interests, the British settlers and pro-British native chieftains on Tahiti led to conflict. In 1836, the Protestant Queen Pōmare IV of Tahiti, under the influence of British consul and former LMS missionary George Pritchard, evicted two French Catholic missionaries from the islands to maintain the dominance of Protestantism in the island kingdom. Seeing this as an affront to the honour of France and the Catholic religion, Jacques-Antoine Moerenhout, the French consul in Tahiti, filed a formal complaint with the French. In 1838, the French naval commander Abel Aubert du Petit-Thouars responded to Moerenhout's complaints. The commander forced the native government to pay an indemnity and sign a treaty of friendship with France respecting the rights of French subjects in the islands including any future Catholic missionaries. Four years later, claiming the Tahitians had violated the treaty, Dupetit Thouars returned and forced the Tahitian chiefs and the queen to sign a request for French protection which he sent back to Europe for ratification.

== War ==
Pritchard had been away on a diplomatic mission to Great Britain during the incident with Dupetit Thouars and returned to find the islands under French control. Encouraged by Pritchard, Queen Pōmare resisted in vain against French intervention, writing to Queen Victoria, asking for British intervention, and to King Louis Philippe I of France. She refused to fly the flag of the protectorate with the French tricolour at its canton and continued to fly the Tahitian flag at her residence. In November 1843, Dupetit Thouars deposed the queen for her continued resistance and formally annexed the islands, placing Armand Joseph Bruat in charge as colonial governor. Pōmare IV and her family took refuge in the British consulate and later fled into exile on the neighboring island of Raiatea aboard the British ship HMS Basilisk. Pritchard was imprisoned and deported by the French, an action which nearly sparked conflict with the British had the French not formally apologized for the seizure of the British consul. The incident became known as the Pritchard Affair.

In the absence of their queen, the Tahitian populace began an armed resistance on 13 March 1844. The loyalist forces were led initially by a chief named Fanaue, but he was later replaced by Utami (who switched sides after being allied initially to the French takeover) and his second-in-command Maiʻo along with other chiefs sympathetic to the rebel cause. They fought against the French forces, which also included a few pro-French Tahitian chiefs including Paraita, Tati and Hitoti. At the Battle of Mahaena, on 17 April 1844, a force of 441 French soldiers defeated an under-equipped native force twice its size. A total of 15 French soldiers and 102 Tahitians died in this battle. Following the defeat of the native forces at Mahaena, the two sides engaged in guerrilla warfare in the fortified valleys of the Tahitian countryside.

On the second front, the French attempted to conquer and annex the three neighboring island kingdoms in the Leeward Islands. These were Raiatea under King Tamatoa IV (where Pōmare had sought refuge), Huahine under Queen Teriitaria II, and Bora Bora under King Tapoa II. These islands had traditionally owed formal allegiance to the Pōmare family which the French interpreted as actual jurisdiction. A naval blockade of Raiatea by French captain Louis Adolphe Bonard was lifted when the warriors of Huahine under Queen Teriitaria "massacred" the French forces at the Battle of Maeva where 18 French marines were killed and 43 were wounded.

Great Britain remained officially neutral and never intervened militarily. However, the presence of over a dozen British naval warships in the waters of the Society Islands was a constant concern for the French. Many British officers were sympathetic to the Tahitian cause and were either openly hostile or stubbornly ambivalent to the French administration. Captain Andrew Snape Hamond, of HMS Salamander, wrote that if the British had actively forestalled the French, "England might have been spared the pain of seeing the Pet Lamb she has fostered and brought snatched from her protection by unprincipled Frenchmen". In 1846, Admiral George Seymour, the British commander-in-chief of the Pacific Station, visited Raiatea and "declared all French enactments there null and void" and had a private audience with Queen Pomare. From 1846 to 1847, the British Navy officer Henry Byam Martin and commander of HMS Grampus, was sent to the Society Islands to spy on the conflict. He was charged with investigating Queen Pōmare's suzerainty claims to the other islands. His account of the closing months of the conflict are recorded in The Polynesian Journal of Captain Henry Byam Martin, R.N.

== Defeat of Tahitian resistance ==
The guerrilla conflict came to an end with the defeat of the Tahitians at the Battle of Punaruu in May 1846 and the capture of Fort Fautaua on 17 December 1846. In February 1847, Queen Pōmare IV returned from her exile and acquiesced to rule under the protectorate. Although victorious, the French were unable to annex the islands outright because of diplomatic pressure from Great Britain, so Tahiti and its dependency Moorea continued to be ruled under the French protectorate.

A clause to the war settlement, known as the Jarnac Convention or the Anglo-French Convention of 1847, was signed by France and Great Britain, in which the two powers agreed to respect the independence of Queen Pōmare's allies in Huahine, Raiatea, and Bora Bora. The French continued the guise of protection on Tahiti until the 1880s when they formally annexed Tahiti and the Leeward Islands (through the Leewards War which ended in 1897), forming French Polynesia.
