= Utami =

Utami is both a given name and a surname. Notable people with the name include:

- Ayu Utami (born 1968), Indonesian writer
- Utami Hayashishita (林下 詩美; born 1998), Japanese professional wrestler
- Utami Kinard (born 1951), Indonesian badminton player
- Putu Dini Jasita Utami (born 1994), Indonesian beach volleyball player
- Trie Utami (born 1968), Indonesian singer
