= Tahitoe =

- King of Raiatea
- Reign: 8 February 1871 – 13 April 1881
- Coronation: 1 August 1872
- Predecessor: Tamatoa V
- Successor: Tehauroa
- Born: c. 1808
- Died: 13 April 1881 (aged 72–73)
- Spouse: Te'eva; Metua'aro
- Issue: Tehauroa; Tuarii
- Father: Hihipa
- Mother: Te-opua

Tahitoe (c. 1808–1881) was the king of Raiatea from 1871 to 1881.

Tahitoe and other leading chiefs and governors of Raiatea and Tahaa refused to accept the rule of Tamatoa V in 1858. Tamarii, the chief of the council, and others attempted to petition the United States to put the islands under an American protectorate. Letters were sent by the United States Consul to Raiatea Henry Owner to Secretary of State Lewis Cass. The diplomatic ploy was discovered by the French colonial officials in Tahiti and the Raiatean nobles scapegoated two Americans residents: Joseph Jordan and Thomas Croft and a native named Poare. Tahitoe, who had not signed the request for a protectorate, opposed the secret plan and wrote to President James Buchanan saying the proposal was not approved by the people. Consul Owner was recalled by the United States for fear of French reprisal for his involvement in the affair. Tamatoa was reinstated on 4 December 1859 after he agreed to cooperate with the governors.

== Biography ==
Tahitoe was born in 1808. He was son of prince Hihipa of Raiatea and his wife, Te-opua. His father was a grandchild of the king Tamatoa II of Raiatea and Tahaa.

Tahitoe married in 1810 Te'eva. He remarried in 1836 with Metua'aro. He had 8 children.

- Princess Rere-ao Tahitoe.
- Prince Tehaupoto
- Princess Tetuaiterai
- Princess Teihotua
- Princess Vaira'atoa
- Princess Ari'itiria
- Prince Tahitorai
- Princess Tetupaia

Another daughter was Queen Tuarii who ruled a resistance government against France from 1888 to 1897.

Regnal titles
Preceded by Tamatoa V	King of Raiatea; 1871–1881	Succeeded by Tehauroa
