= Tehauroa =

- Queen of Raiatea and Tahaa
- Reign: 13 April 1881 – 18 March 1884
- Coronation: 13 April 1881
- Predecessor: Tahitoe
- Successor: Tamatoa VI
- Born: c. 1830
- Died: 18 March 1884 (aged 53–54)
- Rere-ao Te-hau-roa-ari'i
- House: House of Tamatoa
- Father: Tahitoe
- Mother: Metua'aro
- Religion: Protestantism

Rere-ao Te-hau-roa-ari'i, also given as Teri'i-hau-roa (c. 1830 – 18 March 1884), was the Queen of Raiatea and Tahaa. In the Tahitian language, her name means "flying-in-the-world" and "perpetual peace" or "long governments of kings".

== Life ==
Tehauroa was the daughter of King Tahitoe of Raiatea and his second wife, Metua'aro. Her grandfather Hihipa Tahitoe was the son of Vete'a-ra'i U'uru, the chief of Opoa, and grandson of King Tamatoa II of Raiatea from whom her family claimed the right to throne of Raiatea. She was the namesake of her grandmother Rere-ao, wife of Hihipa Tahitoe, who was the daughter of Queen Maevarua of Bora Bora and sister of King Tapoa I of Tahaa and Bora Bora.

Her father succeeded to the throne after the deposition and banishment of the unpopular Tamatoa V in 1871, and she was named as his heir. In March 1881, her father was in turn deposed by the Raiatean people for allowing the French to declare a protectorate over the kingdom. Consequently, in April, she was elected to succeed him to the throne with a council of twelve district chiefs, four from Tahaa and eight from Raiatea. Her coronation was performed by Reverend Albert Pearse at Uturoa Church with due solemnity and rejoicings.

On 1 October 1882, she outlawed the sale of alcohol from her kingdom, with the exceptions of religious or remedial uses. Another action of her reign was the revision of the Kingdom's law code. This version titled the Code of Tehauroa (1884) was the last revision to the constitutional law code; it outlawed the sale of land, permitted up to that point, and made Protestantism the only authorized religion. These changes were enacted to counter the influence of France, which had already declared Raiatea a French protectorate during her father's reign. In 1881, she unsuccessfully attempted to enlist the protection of the British to preserve the independence of Raiatea in accordance with the Jarnac Convention of 1847.

Remaining unmarried, Tehauroa died on 18 March 1884 after a short illness. A civil war nearly broke out between two rivals for the throne. To avoid French intervention a female-line cousin of the late queen, the equally pious Prince Ari'imate Teururai of Huahine, was invited to ascend the throne as King Tamatoa VI. This effectively ended the rule of the Tamatoa Dynasty. Her younger sister later succeeded as Queen Tuarii from 1888 to 1897 under a rebel government.

Regnal titles
Preceded by Tahitoe	King of Raiatea; 1881–1884	Succeeded by Tamatoa VI
