= Avera, Raiatea =

ʻĀvera
- Associated commune of Taputapuatea
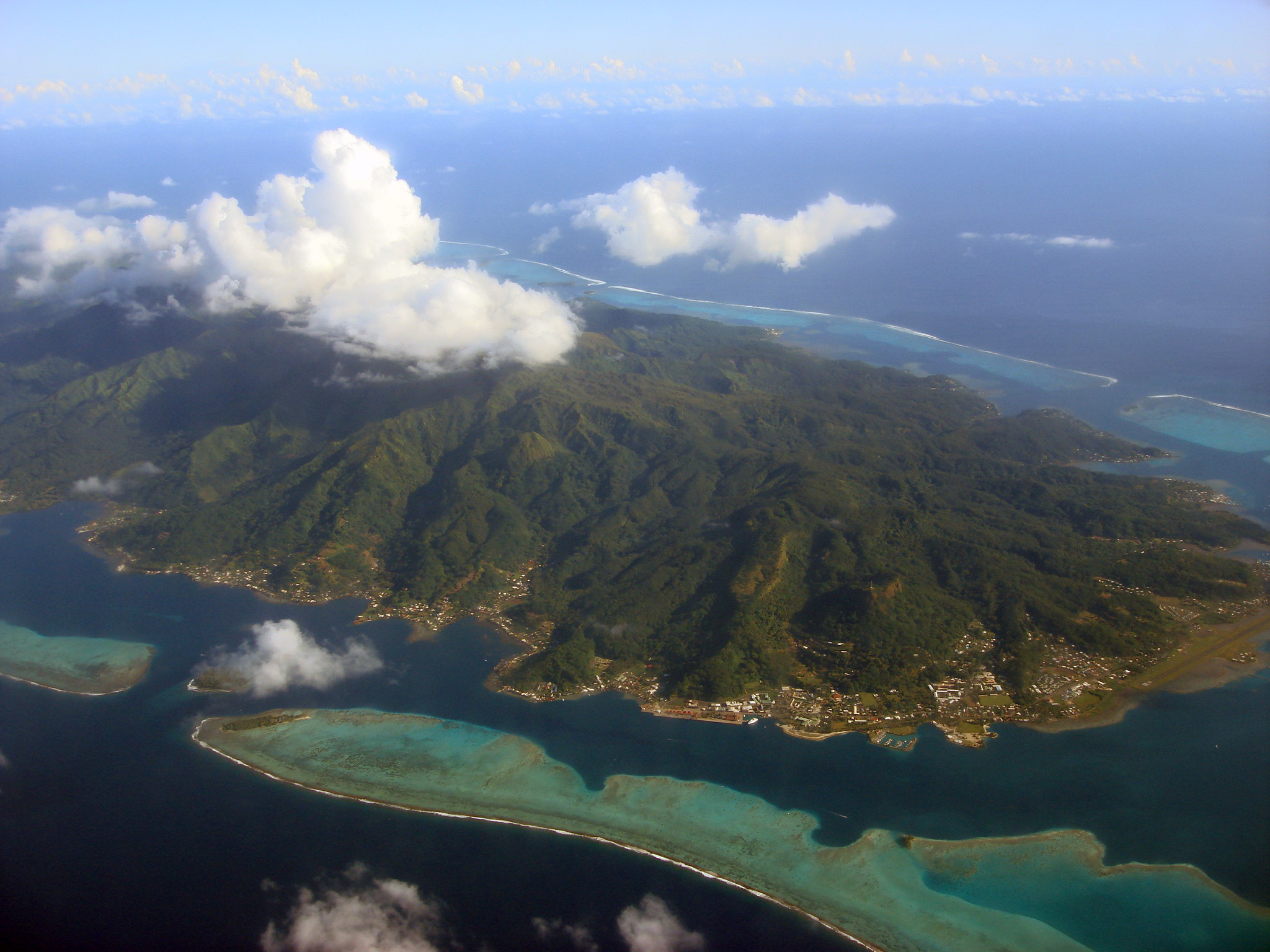
- Raiatea, the island on which ʻĀvera is located

- Location within French Polynesia
- Location of ʻĀvera
- Coordinates: 16°47′52″S 151°24′4″W
- Country: France
- Overseas collectivity: French Polynesia
- Subdivision: Leeward Islands
- Commune: Taputapuatea
- Elevation: 15 m (49 ft)
- Population (2022): 3,440
- Time zone: UTC−10:00

ʻĀvera is an associated commune on the island of Raiatea, in French Polynesia. It is the larger of two villages in French Polynesia with this name, the other being located on the island of Rurutu. It is part of the commune Taputapuatea. According to the 2022 census, it had a population of 3,440.
