= Avaiki =

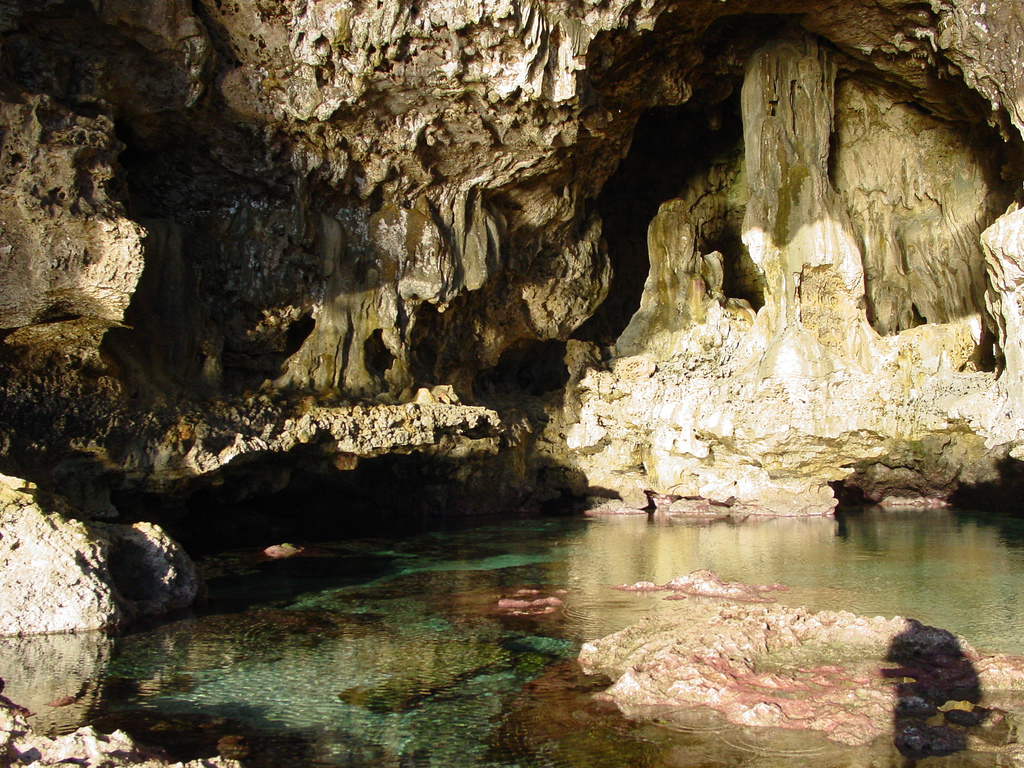
A present-day Avaiki, this one located in Niue

Avaiki is one of the many names by which the peoples of Polynesia refer to their ancestral and spiritual homelands.

== Samoa, Hawaii, Cook Islands ==
By no means certain, but certainly possible, is an origin in the large islands of Samoa, namely Savaii and Upolu. Variants include, in order of migration, Havaii, the old name for Raiatea in French Polynesia; the far better known Hawaii in the United States, Avaiki in the Cook Islands and Niue and Hawaiki in New Zealand.

There are endless local variants. In the Cook Islands, for example, on the capital island of Rarotonga, northern facing volcanic rocks, tumbling onto the shore millennia ago and still set in place, are well known as the ancient departure point for souls bound for Avaiki - the afterworld or heaven.

In fact each island, vaka or ngati (family line) has its own Avaiki or interpretation of it. For instance it would be somewhere in the Manu'a islands group (American Samoa) for the Ngati Karika (Te au o Tonga tribe - Rarotonga). For the Ngati Tangi'ia (Takitumu tribe-Rarotonga), it would be at Tahiti. Others locate Avaiki at Raiatea...

== Mythology ==
In the mythology of Mangaia in the Cook Islands, Avaiki is the "underworld" or "netherworld". It is described like a hollow of a vast coconut shell. Varima-te-takere, the mother of Vatea, lives in the lowest depths of the interior of this coconut shell. Nevertheless, the New Zealand anthropologist Peter Buck (Te Rangi Hīroa), gives a less mystical interpretation of this Mangaian Avaiki: "when Tangi'ia came to Rarotonga from Tahiti, he brought with him some rankless "manahune" [commoners] ... As they had no chance of rising in social status, some of them under the leadership of Rangi migrated to Mangaia to start a new life (c.1450–1475). Their antagonism toward Rarotonga made them conceal the land of origin and invent an origin from a spiritual homeland in the netherworld of Avaiki."

== Solomon Islands connection ==
While Solomon Islands is mostly considered Melanesia, the province of Rennell and Bellona is Polynesian. The province consists of Rennell Island, Bellona Island and the uninhabited Indispensable Reefs.

The locals call Rennell Island “MUNGAVA” and they call Bellona Island “MUNGIKI”. They then combine the last three letters of each Island and come up with a word called AVAIKI. If someone local does something silly you might hear someone say ‘That’s the Avaiki way’. A further example of this nomenclature can also be evidenced with the identification of the name of the Province, Renbel which combines Rennell and Bellona. MV Renbel is also the name of the ferry that supplies the province from Honiara.

There is also a rugby and netball team on Rennell Island called Avaiki.
