= Jarnac Convention =

1847 treaty between France and the United Kingdom

The Jarnac Convention was a bilateral agreement between the Kingdom of France and the United Kingdom in 1847 at the end of the Franco-Tahitian War. Its purpose was to end Franco-British diplomatic tension by guaranteeing the independence of the Leeward Islands in Polynesia. It was abrogated with the agreement of both parties in 1887.

== Background ==
In 1839, a British Protestant missionary, George Pritchard, was sent to Polynesia to convert its people. He became the British consul in Tahiti and persuaded the queen, Pomare IV, to expel Catholic missionaries from the islands. This prompted France to take control of the islands and to establish a protectorate over them in 1843 leading to the Franco-Tahitian War. Pritchard was expelled, leading to diplomatic tension between France and Britain.

== Agreement ==
To bring this tension to an end, King Louis-Philippe agreed to the Jarmac Convention, under which both countries recognised the independence of the Leeward Islands and agreed not to place them under a protectorate. It was signed in London on 19 June 1847 by Lord Palmerston, the British Foreign Secretary and the comte de Jarnac, French Minister Plenipotentiary in London.

== Abrogation ==
The convention was to have effect for forty years. However, in 1880 France placed the islands of Raiatea and Tahaa under a provisional protectorate at their own request, to prevent their being annexed by the German Empire. In October 1887 Britain and France agreed to formally abrogate the convention. This led to a rebellion on the islands that lasted for a decade and their eventual annexation by military force. Together with all the remaining Leeward Islands, Raiatea and Tahaa became part of French Polynesia on 19 March 1898.

== See also ==
- Kingdom of Bora Bora
- German Samoa
