= Maohi =

Ancestors of the Polynesian peoples

Maohi (Mā’ohi in Tahitian language) are the ancestors of the Polynesian peoples in Tahiti and adjacent islands.

The term can also refer to normal, everyday people, just as Māori is accepted among native or indigenous people in New Zealand or the Cook Islands as the way they describe themselves. Te Ao Maohi (the Maohi world), an expression coined by Oscar Temaru, is an example of this.

== History ==
The Ma'ohi people first arrived to what is known today as French Polynesia over 2,300 years ago. The Ma'ohi include not only Tahiti but 17 surrounding islands in French Polynesia. It was not until the 18th century that external influence was introduced to the Ma'ohi people. In 1880 France seized control of Tahiti and its surrounding islands.

== La Culture Ma'ohi ==
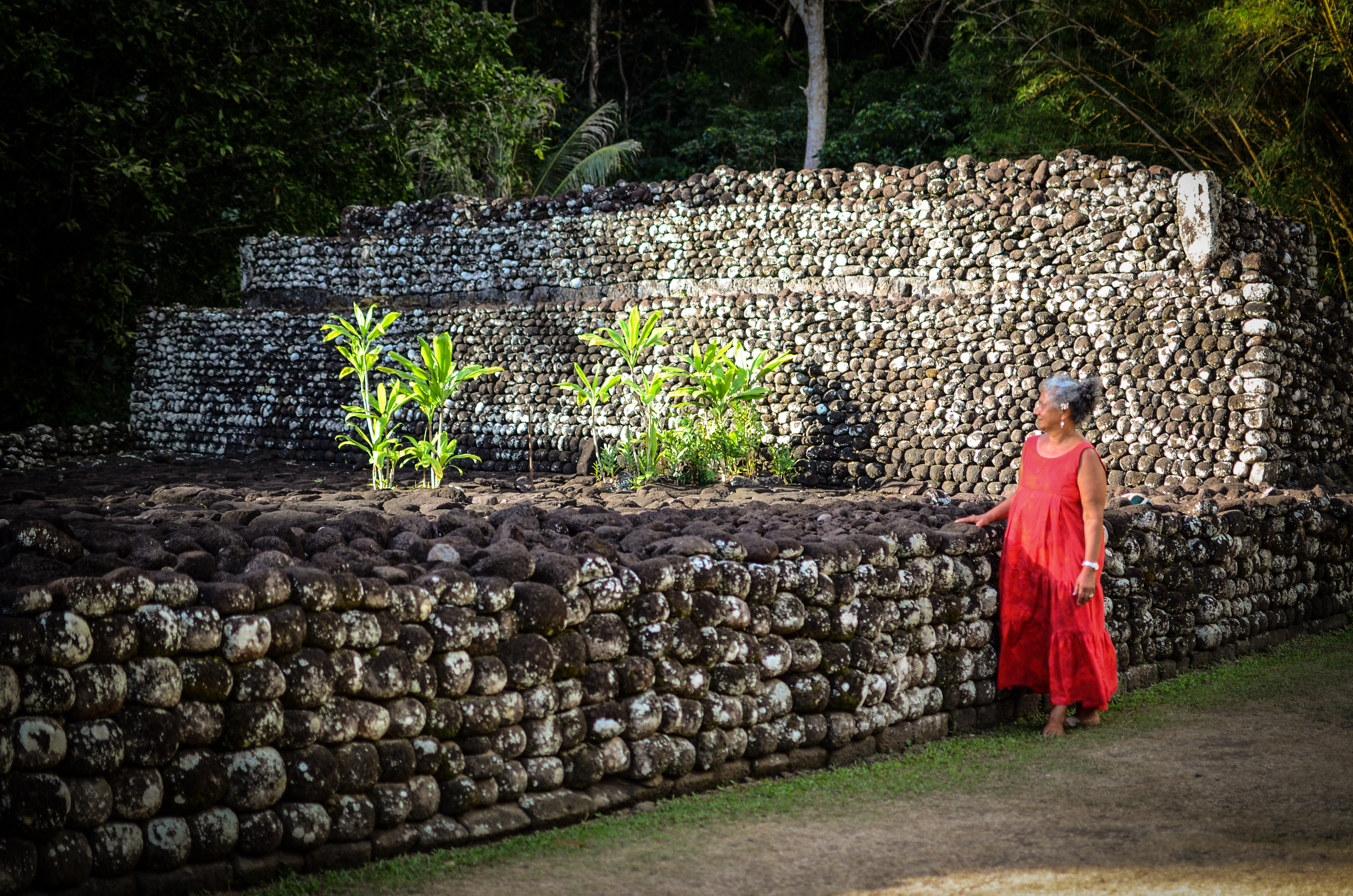
Marae Arahurahu, one of the traditional maraes in Tahiti

La Culture Ma'ohi is a movement of the Ma'ohi people to rediscover their culture after colonization by the French in the mid-nineteenth century. Most traditions from the Ma'ohi culture were lost due to colonization, and diverse influences from neighboring islands such as the Marquesas, Austral and Cook Islands helped to reconstruct post-contact Tahitian culture. Reinterpretation of traditions such as art and dance as well as reconstructions of traditional maraes played an important role in recreating a cultural identity for Tahitians. It was not until the 1950s that the reconstruction of these traditions began, due to an overall lack of knowledge about Tahitian culture. La Culture Ma'ohi is a way for Tahitian politicians to heighten awareness of the cultural past as well as create an identity for the future of Tahiti.

=== Dance ===
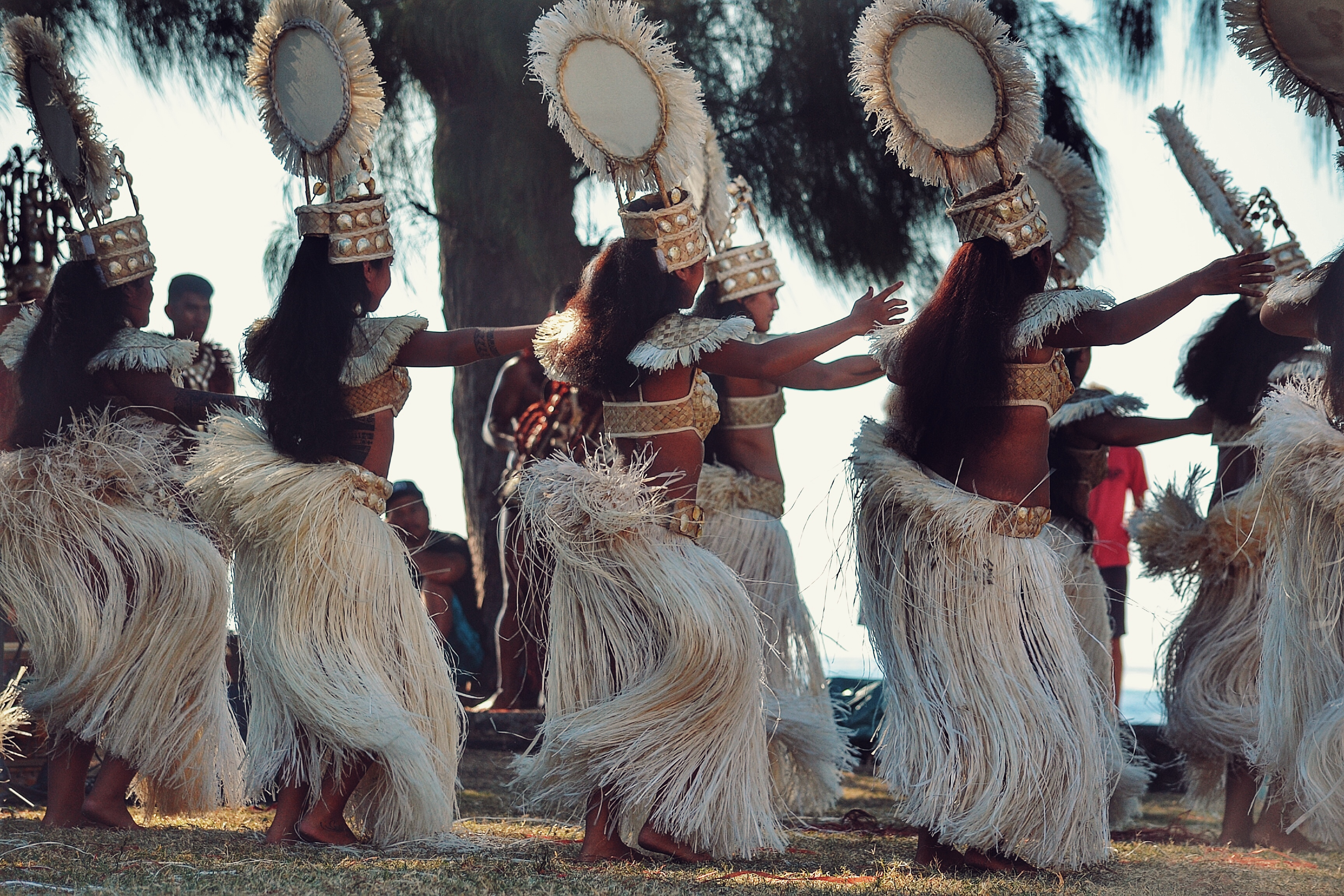
Traditional Tahitian dancers

Traditional dance was one piece of the Ma'ohi culture that was lost due to colonization by the French. Historical reenactments of the dances, the costumes and the chants had to be reconstructed due to there being no feasible way of knowing what the authentic creations were to begin with. The Heiva is a traditional annual dance event that started in the 1950s as a way to bring traditional Tahitian dance back into Tahitian culture.

=== Tattooing ===
Tattoos have become an accepted symbol of Ma'ohi culture in Tahiti. Tattoos demonstrate a commitment to Tahitian cultural identity and can be seen as decorative. The majority of people who have tattoos are young and are involved in other aspects of Tahitian culture such as dance. The practice of tattooing also exists in other islands of the Polynesian Triangle.

== See also ==
- Maohi Protestant Church
- Unrepresented Nations and Peoples Organization
