= William Wyatt Gill =

British missionary (1828–1896)

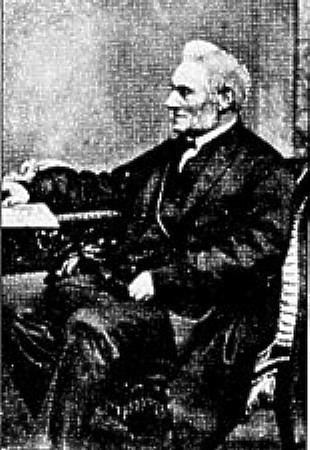
Rev. William Wyatt Gill, late-19th century.

William Wyatt Gill (27 December 1828 – 11 November 1896) was an English missionary, active in Australia and the South Pacific region after 1851.

== Early life ==
Gill was born in Bristol, England, son of John Gill of Barton Hill and his wife Jane, daughter of Richard Wyatt. Educated in Kingsland Congregational Chapel, Bristol, he became a member at the age of 14 and had an early interest in the ministry.

After three years study at Highbury College, London, and a year of study at New College, University of London (B.A., 1850), he was discouraged from missionary work, but his eagerness to accompany Rev. Aaron Buzacott to the Cook Islands met with approval and in June 1851 he was accepted by the London Missionary Society. On 11 July he was ordained at Spa Fields Chapel and on 15 November he arrived at Hobart Town in the mission ship John Williams where he began his missionary work in Australia.

== Missionary work ==
Gill accompanied Buzacott and Henry Hopkins on missionary work at Launceston, Melbourne and Geelong. On 23 November 1851 he reached Sydney where he met Mary Layman Harrison, a pious Anglican, whom he married on 19 December. In 1852-72 Gill worked at Mangaia, Cook Islands, except for five months in 1858 at Rarotonga in charge of the institution for training native teachers and a visit to Sydney in 1862–63. In 1872 with Rev. A. W. Murray he visited the principal islands in Torres Strait and on 7 November landed the first teachers, including six Cook Islanders, at Kataw in New Guinea. In 1873 he sailed for England where he read to the Royal Geographical Society his paper 'A Visit to Torres Straits and Mainland of New Guinea'. Gill was stationed on Rarotonga from April 1877 until he retired in November 1883 after his wife died in July. On 10 June 1885 he married his second wife Emily, née Corrie (1843-1923). In 1889 the University of St Andrews conferred on him an honorary doctorate.

== Later life ==
He died on 11 November 1896 and was buried in the Waverley Cemetery, Sydney. He was survived by his second wife and by seven of the ten children of his first marriage. His eldest daughter Honor was married to a missionary in Samoa.

== Works ==
- Gems from the Coral Islands : or incidents of contrast between savage and Christian life of the South Sea Islanders (1855)
- Life in the Southern Isles; or, Scenes and Incidents in the South Pacific and New Guinea (London, 1876)
- Myths and Songs from the South Pacific (London, 1876)
- Historical Sketches of Savage Life in Polynesia (Wellington, 1880)
- Work and Adventure in New Guinea 1877 to 1885 (London, 1885)
- Jottings from the Pacific (London, 1885)
- From Darkness to Light in Polynesia (London, 1894)
- The South Pacific and New Guinea Past and Present
- Rarotonga Records
- Cook Island Custom
- Selections from the Autobiography of the Rev. William Gill
