= Tamatoa VI =

- King of Raiatea and Tahaa
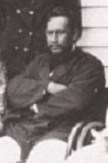

King of Ra'iātea and Taha'a
- Reign: 22 January 1885 – 18 March 1888
- Coronation: 22 January 1885
- Predecessor: Tehauroa
- Successor: Monarchy abolished in 1888 for French Third Republic; Tuarii (rebel government)
- Born: 7 June 1853; Tefarerii, Huahine
- Died: September 15, 1905 (aged 51-52); Fare, Huahine
- Burial: Fare, Huahine
- Spouse: The Hon. Chiefess Tetuanuimarama a Atitioroi
- Issue: Hereditary Prince Tamatoa Teururai; Prince Opuhara Pehupehu Teururai; Princess Tevahinehaamoetua Teururai; Prince Mahinetaaroaarii Tevaearai Teururai; Princess Teriivanaaiterai Teururai
Names
- Prince Ioata, Ariimate, Teururai a Teururai of Huahine also known as Teururai Teuhe a Teururai at his death
- House: House of Teurura'i
- Father: King Teurura'i, Ari'imate of Huahine
- Mother: Queen Tehaapapa II of Huahine

Prince Ariimate Teururai, later known as King Tamatoa VI (7 June 1853 – 15 September 1905), was a member of a Tahitian royal family, the House of Teururai which reigned on the island of Huahine and Maia'o during the 19th century.

He was installed as King of Ra'iatea and Taha'a in 1884, but was deposed in 1888.

== Biography ==
Tamatoa VI was born as Ioata Ariimate Teururai a Teururai and died as Teururai Teuhe a Teururai. He was the last King of Ra'iātea and Taha'a. He was the second son of King Teurura'i, Ari'imate of Huahine. His mother, Princess Teha'apapa Maerehia of Ra'iātea, was the only living child of King Tamatoa IV of Ra'iātea. She became Queen regnant of Huahine under the regnal name of Tehaʻapapa II in 8 July 1868 after her husband was deposed by the chiefs on the night of 7 July 1868.

== Heir to the Ra'iātea and Taha'a kingdom ==
He was installed as king of Ra'iātea and Taha'a in 1884. He was crowned and anointed by missionary Ebenezer Vicessimus Cooper on 22 January 1885 in Ra'iātea. He took the regnal name Tamatoa VI. Throughout his reign, he bore the appellation Tautu, in commemoration of his forebear.

His reign ended when the French annexed the two islands of Ra'iatea and Taha'a on 16 March 1888.

After his abdication, he returned to his natal island where he was later proclaimed chief of the district of Tefareri'i in the name of Ioata, the same year that his niece Queen Tehaʻapapa III abdicated.

== Marriage and children ==
He married Tetuanuimarama a Atitioroi (daughter of Atitioroi a Ori, of the Tati family of Papara) and had three sons and three daughters:

- Crown Prince Tamatoa Teururai of Raiatea and Taha'a.
- Prince Opuhara Pehupehu Teururai.
- Princess Tevahinehaamoetua Teururai.
- Princess Teriivanaaiterai Teururai.
- Prince Mahinetaaroaarii Tevaearai Teururai.
- Prince Tefauvero Teururai.

Their children remain the pretenders to the royal family of Ra'iātea and Taha'a since the end of the monarchy on this island.

He died at Fare, Huahine in 1905.

Huahine family tree

Tamatoa I (or II)
Rofa'i	Ari'ima'o
Tamatoa Dynasty of Raiatea	Mau'a
Rohianu'u	Tehaapapa I Queen of Huahine and Mai'ao	Mato	Tetuaveroa
Teriitaria I King of Huahine and Mai'ao	Tenani'a; King of Huahine and Mai'ao
Pōmare Dynasty of Tahiti	Tamatoa III, King of Raiatea and Taha'a	Tura'iari'i Ehevahine	Mahine Tehei'ura; King of Huahine and Mai'ao	Tao'a
Pōmare II; King of Tahiti	Teriʻitoʻoterai; Teremoemoe	Teriitaria II; Queen of Huahine and Mai'ao	Moeore, Tamatoa IV; King of Raiatea and Taha'a	Ta'aroari'i	Tematafainuu
Pōmare IV; Queen of Tahiti	Pōmare III; King of Tahiti	Tehaapapa II; Queen of Huahine and Mai'ao	Ariimate Teururai; King of Huahine and Mai'ao	Ma'ihara Temari'i
Tamatoa V King of Raiatea	Pōmare V King of Tahiti	Teuhe; Queen of Huahine	Tetuamarama	Marama Teururai; Prince-Regent of Huahine	Tamatoa VI; King of Raiatea and Taha'a
Teriitevaearai a Mai from the Mai family of Bora Bora	Tehaapapa III; Queen of Huahine

Notes:

Descending dotted lines denote adoptions.

References

- Henry, Teuira; Orsmond, John Muggridge (1928). Ancient Tahiti. Vol. 48. Honolulu: Bernice Pauahi Bishop Museum. pp. 247–272. OCLC 3049679.
- Newbury, Colin W.; Darling, Adam J. (December 1967). "Te Hau Pahu Rahi: Pomare II and the Concept of Interisland Government in Eastern Polynesia". The Journal of the Polynesian Society. 76 (4). Wellington: The Polynesian Society: 477–514. JSTOR 20704508. OCLC 6015244633.
- Teissier, Raoul (1978). "Chefs et notables des Établissements Français de l'Océanie au temps du protectorat: 1842–1850". Bulletin de la Société des Études Océaniennes, Issue 202. Papeete: Société des Études Océaniennes. OCLC 9510786.

Raiatea family tree

Tamatoa I (or II)
Bora Bora family
Ari'ima'o	Rofa'i
Puni; Ariʻi Rahi of Bora Bora, Raiatea and Taha'a	Pōmare Dynasty of Tahiti	Mau'a	Tamatoa II (or III)
Teu; Ariʻi of Pare-Arue; Ariʻi of the Porionuʻu	Tetupaia i Hauiri	Mato	Vete'ara'i 'U'uru; Ariʻi rahi of Opoa
Pōmare I King of Tahiti	Tura'iari'i Ehevahine	Tamatoa III (or IV); Ari'i Rahi of Raiatea	Tahitoe Hihipo
Tapoa I Ariʻi Rahi of Bora Bora, Raiatea and Taha'a	Pōmare II; King of Tahiti	Teriʻitoʻoterai; Teremoemoe	Teriitaria II; Queen of Huahine	Teihotu Ta'avea	Moeore, Tamatoa IV; King of Raiatea	Tahitoe; King of Raiatea
Tapoa II; King of Bora Bora and Taha'a	Pōmare IV; Queen of Tahiti	Ari'ifa'aite	Ariimate Teururai; King of Huahine	Tehaapapa II; Queen of Huahine	Tehauroa; Queen of Raiatea	Tuarii; Queen of Raiatea
Pōmare V King of Tahiti	Teri'imaevarua II; Queen of Bora Bora	Tamatoa V King of Raiatea	Moe a Ma'i	Tamatoa VI; King of Raiatea
Princess Teriiourumaona _{Tahitian Heir as Pōmare VI}	Princess Teriivaetua	Teri'imaevarua III; Queen of Bora Bora	Princess Teriinavahoroa	Princess 'Aimata	Prince Tamatoa

Notes:

The numbering of the Tamatoa varies. An ancestor of the Tamatoa line named Fa'aniti is often counted as "Tamatoa I" and Moeore is sometime not considered Tamatoa IV.

References

- Cadousteau, Mai-Arii (1987). "CHAPITRE VIII: AHU'URA FILLE DU ROI MAI III". Bulletin de la Société des Études Océaniennes. 20 (239–240). Papeete: Société des Études Océaniennes: 45–50. OCLC 9510786.
- Henry, Teuira; Orsmond, John Muggridge (1928). Ancient Tahiti. Vol. 48. Honolulu: Bernice Pauahi Bishop Museum. pp. 247–272. OCLC 3049679.
- Newbury, Colin W.; Darling, Adam J. (December 1967). "Te Hau Pahu Rahi: Pomare II and the Concept of Interisland Government in Eastern Polynesia". The Journal of the Polynesian Society. 76 (4). Wellington: The Polynesian Society: 477–514. JSTOR 20704508. OCLC 6015244633.
- Orsmond, John Muggridge; Smith, S. Percy (March 1893). "The Genealogy of the Pomare Family of Tahiti, from the Papers of the Rev. J. M. Orsmond. With Notes Thereon by S. Percy Smith". The Journal of the Polynesian Society. 2 (1). Wellington: The Polynesian Society: 25–43. JSTOR 20701269. OCLC 5544732839.
- Teissier, Raoul (1978). "Chefs et notables des Établissements Français de l'Océanie au temps du protectorat: 1842–1850". Bulletin de la Société des Études Océaniennes, Issue 202. Papeete: Société des Études Océaniennes. OCLC 9510786.

Ancestors of Tamatoa VI

8. Mahine, Puru, Teheiura
4. Ta'aroari'i
9. Taoa of Fareihi
2. Ari'imate, Teurura'i
10. Hauti'a
5. Tematafainu'u
11. Taura'a
1. Tamatoa VI
22. Tamatoa III, Tapa
6. Tamatoa IV, Moeore
13. The Hon. Chiefess Turaiarii Ehevahine of Huahine
3. Tehaapapa II
14. The Hon. Chief of Vaiari
7. Mahuti of Vaiari

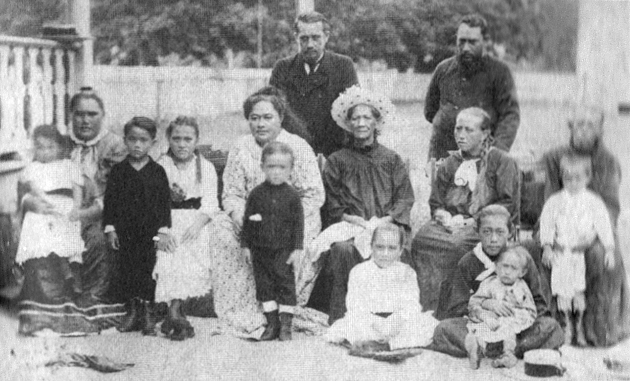
Teururai Teuhe a Teururai (standing left) and his family, c. 1890

== See also ==
- List of monarchs of Huahine
- List of monarchs of Tahiti
- French Polynesia
- List of monarchs who lost their thrones in the 19th century (Rai'atea)

Regnal titles
Preceded by Tehauroa	King of Raiatea; 1885–1888	Succeeded by French Third Republic; Tuarii (rebel government)
