= Tenania =

Tenani'a
- King of Huahine and Mai'ao
- Reign: 1793–1810
- Predecessor: Teri'itaria I
- Successor: Mahine Teheiura
- Born: 1760
- Died: 1814 (aged 43–44)
- Spouse: Tohema'i Teheuatua; Itia Tetuanuireiaitera'iatea
- Issue: Tura'iari'i Tera'imano v. Teri'ia'etua Tera'imano v.
Names
- Tenani'a Ari'ipaea Otihe Utami
- Father: Mato Teri'itepoare'i
- Mother: Tetuaveroa

Tenaniʻa (c. 1760–1814) also called Otihe or Ari'ipaea was a sovereign of the islands of Huahine and Mai'ao located among the Society Islands. He became a king in the 1790s after he deposed Teri'itaria I, his half-brother. He died under the name Ūtami on January 26, 1814, in Mo'orea ten days after his wife Iti'a.

== Family tree ==
Huahine family tree

Tamatoa I (or II)
Rofa'i	Ari'ima'o
Tamatoa Dynasty of Raiatea	Mau'a
Rohianu'u	Tehaapapa I Queen of Huahine and Mai'ao	Mato	Tetuaveroa
Teriitaria I King of Huahine and Mai'ao	Tenani'a; King of Huahine and Mai'ao
Pōmare Dynasty of Tahiti	Tamatoa III, King of Raiatea and Taha'a	Tura'iari'i Ehevahine	Mahine Tehei'ura; King of Huahine and Mai'ao	Tao'a
Pōmare II; King of Tahiti	Teriʻitoʻoterai; Teremoemoe	Teriitaria II; Queen of Huahine and Mai'ao	Moeore, Tamatoa IV; King of Raiatea and Taha'a	Ta'aroari'i	Tematafainuu
Pōmare IV; Queen of Tahiti	Pōmare III; King of Tahiti	Tehaapapa II; Queen of Huahine and Mai'ao	Ariimate Teururai; King of Huahine and Mai'ao	Ma'ihara Temari'i
Tamatoa V King of Raiatea	Pōmare V King of Tahiti	Teuhe; Queen of Huahine	Tetuamarama	Marama Teururai; Prince-Regent of Huahine	Tamatoa VI; King of Raiatea and Taha'a
Teriitevaearai a Mai from the Mai family of Bora Bora	Tehaapapa III; Queen of Huahine

Notes:

Descending dotted lines denote adoptions.

References

- Henry, Teuira; Orsmond, John Muggridge (1928). Ancient Tahiti. Vol. 48. Honolulu: Bernice Pauahi Bishop Museum. pp. 247–272. OCLC 3049679.
- Newbury, Colin W.; Darling, Adam J. (December 1967). "Te Hau Pahu Rahi: Pomare II and the Concept of Interisland Government in Eastern Polynesia". The Journal of the Polynesian Society. 76 (4). Wellington: The Polynesian Society: 477–514. JSTOR 20704508. OCLC 6015244633.
- Teissier, Raoul (1978). "Chefs et notables des Établissements Français de l'Océanie au temps du protectorat: 1842–1850". Bulletin de la Société des Études Océaniennes, Issue 202. Papeete: Société des Études Océaniennes. OCLC 9510786.

== See also ==
- Kingdom of Huahine
- List of monarchs of Huahine

Tenania Rulers of Huahine Born: 1770 Died: 1814
Preceded by Teriitaria I	King of Huahine; 1793–1810	Succeeded by Mahine
