= List of monarchs of Huahine =

Flag of the Kingdom of Huahine

Map of the Kingdom of Huahine

The Polynesian island of Huahine, in the Society Islands, was a kingdom ruled by the Teurura'i dynasty from the 18th century until its annexation by France in 1895. The island is now a part of French Polynesia.

== Monarchs of Huahine ==
Portrait	Name	Birth–Death	Reign start	Reign end	Notes
	Tehaʻapapa I (Regent)	1735–1810	1760	1790	De facto paramount ruler from 1760 to 1790. First as ariʻi rahi.
	Teriʻitaria I	1769–1793	1777	1793	De facto succeeded his mother Tehaʻapapa in 1790. Deposed in 1793 by his half-brother.
	Tenania	1770–1814	1793	1810	Succeeded his half-brother.
	Mahine Teheiura	1761–1838	1810	1815	Brother of Tenania. He abdicated for his niece Teriʻitaria II of Raiatea.
	Teriʻitaria II	1790–1858	1815	5 January 1852	Deposed during a civil war on 26 December 1851
	Ariʻmate	1824–1874	5 January 1852	8 July 1868	Deposed in July 1868 during a civil war. Succeeded by his wife.
	Tehaʻapapa II	1824–1893	8 July 1868	28 May 1893	Heiress presumptive of King Tamatoa IV of Raiatea and Tahaʻa. Ruler of Huahine (1868–1893), ruled under French protectorate from 1885 to 1890.
	Marama (Regent)	1851–1909	1884	15 September 1895	First born son of the Huahinean sovereign, he acted as regent for his mother and his daughter from 1884 to 1895.
	Teuhe	1848–1891	22 March 1888	22 July 1890	Raised to the kingdom in 1888. She reigned under a rebellion government against her mother Tehaʻapapa II. Deposed in 1890 by her brother regent Marama and exiled in Tahiti where she died one year later.
	Tehaʻapapa III	1879–1917	28 May 1893	15 September 1895	Last Queen of Huahine and Maiaʻo, France annexed Huahine and Maiaʻo on 15 September 1895.

== Family tree ==
Huahine family tree

Tamatoa I (or II)
Rofa'i	Ari'ima'o
Tamatoa Dynasty of Raiatea	Mau'a
Rohianu'u	Tehaapapa I Queen of Huahine and Mai'ao	Mato	Tetuaveroa
Teriitaria I King of Huahine and Mai'ao	Tenani'a; King of Huahine and Mai'ao
Pōmare Dynasty of Tahiti	Tamatoa III, King of Raiatea and Taha'a	Tura'iari'i Ehevahine	Mahine Tehei'ura; King of Huahine and Mai'ao	Tao'a
Pōmare II; King of Tahiti	Teriʻitoʻoterai; Teremoemoe	Teriitaria II; Queen of Huahine and Mai'ao	Moeore, Tamatoa IV; King of Raiatea and Taha'a	Ta'aroari'i	Tematafainuu
Pōmare IV; Queen of Tahiti	Pōmare III; King of Tahiti	Tehaapapa II; Queen of Huahine and Mai'ao	Ariimate Teururai; King of Huahine and Mai'ao	Ma'ihara Temari'i
Tamatoa V King of Raiatea	Pōmare V King of Tahiti	Teuhe; Queen of Huahine	Tetuamarama	Marama Teururai; Prince-Regent of Huahine	Tamatoa VI; King of Raiatea and Taha'a
Teriitevaearai a Mai from the Mai family of Bora Bora	Tehaapapa III; Queen of Huahine

Notes:

Descending dotted lines denote adoptions.

References

- Henry, Teuira; Orsmond, John Muggridge (1928). Ancient Tahiti. Vol. 48. Honolulu: Bernice Pauahi Bishop Museum. pp. 247–272. OCLC 3049679.
- Newbury, Colin W.; Darling, Adam J. (December 1967). "Te Hau Pahu Rahi: Pomare II and the Concept of Interisland Government in Eastern Polynesia". The Journal of the Polynesian Society. 76 (4). Wellington: The Polynesian Society: 477–514. JSTOR 20704508. OCLC 6015244633.
- Teissier, Raoul (1978). "Chefs et notables des Établissements Français de l'Océanie au temps du protectorat: 1842–1850". Bulletin de la Société des Études Océaniennes, Issue 202. Papeete: Société des Études Océaniennes. OCLC 9510786.

== See also ==
- List of monarchs of Tahiti
- List of monarchs of Raiatea
- List of monarchs of Bora Bora
- List of colonial and departmental heads of French Polynesia
- President of French Polynesia
