= Tehaapapa III =

Teha'apapa III
- Queen regnant of Huahine
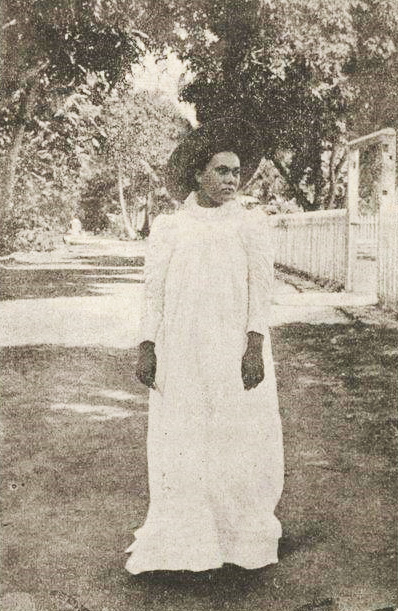
- Photograph by Jules Agostini, 1895.

Queen of Huahine and Maiao
- Reign: 28 May 1893 – 15 September 1895
- Coronation: 11 June 1893
- Predecessor: Tehaapapa II
- Successor: Monarchy abolished in 1895 for French Third Republic
- Born: 8 August 1879; Tefareri'i, Huahine
- Died: 27 April 1917 (aged 37); Fare, Huahine
- Burial: Fare
- Spouse: Teriitevaeara'i a Mai; Sir Tuariihi'onoa
- Issue: Hereditary Prince Tupuna a Mai
Names
- Princess Teri'inavahoro'a of Huahine
- House: House of Teurura'i
- Father: Prince Marama Teurura'i of Huahine
- Mother: Princess Tétua-marama of Rurutu

Princess Teri'inavaharoa (8 August 1879 – 27 April 1917) was the last sovereign monarch of the Kingdom of Huahine and Mai'ao from 1893 to 1895. Comteporary sources seems to call her Tehaapapa II instead, disregarding the ruling queen by the same name at the time James Cook visited the island.

== Biography ==
Teha'apapa III was a member of a royal Tahitian dynasty, the deposed royal family Teururai of Huahine.

As a Tahitian Princess, she became Queen of Huahine.

She was the last Queen of Huahine from 1893 to 1895. She was the eldest daughter of Marama Teururai, prince regent of Huahine by his wife Tetuanuimarama a Teuruari'i, Princess of Rurutu.

She was crowned with the regnal name Teha'apapa III in 1893, and was deposed when Huahine was annexed by the French in September 1895.

== Marriage ==
She married first at Fare on 15 May 1895 (divorced 6 August 1897) to His Highness Teriitevaearai a Mai, a descendant of Mai, of the Princely House of Bora Bora, and secondly on 1900 to a native minor noble man called Tinitua a Tuariihi'onoa .

She had one son by her first husband and eleven other natural children through a morganatic union with Tinitua a Tuariihi'onoa.

She died at Fare, 27 April 1917.

== Ancestry ==
Ancestors of Tehaapapa III

8. The Hon. Chief Taaroari'i of Huahine
4. King Ari'imate of Huahine
9. Tematafainuu vahine
2. Prince Marama Teurura'i of Huahine
10. King Tamatoa IV of Ra'iatea and Taha'a
5. Princess Maerehia of Ra'iatea and Taha'a
11. The Hon. Chiefess Poatevarua Metua Teari'inoho Mahuti of Vaiari
1. Queen Teha'apapa III of Huahine
12. King Teuruari'i II of Rurutu
6. King Teuruari'i III of Rurutu
13. Api Apirouru Vahio
3. Princess Tetuamarama of Rurutu
7. Temataurari'i a Tavita

== See also ==
- French Polynesia
- Annexation of the Leeward Islands
- List of monarchs who lost their thrones in the 19th century

== External links and sources ==
- Michel Brun, Edgar Tetahiotupa (2007). Eteroa: mythes, légendes et traditions d'une île polynésienne. Gallimard. ISBN 978-2070777082.
- Jean-François BARE, Tahiti, les temps et les pouvoirs. Pour une anthropologie historique du Tahiti post-européen, Paris, ORSTOM, 543 p.
- Eugène HANNI, Trois ans chez les Canaques. Odyssée d'un Neuchâtelois autour du monde. Lausanne, Payot & Co Éditeurs, 342p.,
- Teuira Henry, Tahiti aux temps anciens (traduction française de Bertrand Jaunez, Pars, Musée de l'Homme, Société des Océanistes, 671p. (édition originale Ancient Tahiti, Honolulu 1928)
- Bruno SAURA, La lignée royale des Tamatoa de Ra'iatea (îles Sous-le-Vent), Papeete, ministère de la Culture, 229 p.
- Bruno SAURA, Huahine aux temps anciens, Cahiers du Patrimoine [Savoirs et traditions] et Tradition orale, édition 2006.
- Raoul TEISSIER, Chefs et notables au temps du protectorat: 1842 - 1880, Société des Études Océaniennes, réédition de 1996.

== Family ==
Huahine family tree

Tamatoa I (or II)
Rofa'i	Ari'ima'o
Tamatoa Dynasty of Raiatea	Mau'a
Rohianu'u	Tehaapapa I Queen of Huahine and Mai'ao	Mato	Tetuaveroa
Teriitaria I King of Huahine and Mai'ao	Tenani'a; King of Huahine and Mai'ao
Pōmare Dynasty of Tahiti	Tamatoa III, King of Raiatea and Taha'a	Tura'iari'i Ehevahine	Mahine Tehei'ura; King of Huahine and Mai'ao	Tao'a
Pōmare II; King of Tahiti	Teriʻitoʻoterai; Teremoemoe	Teriitaria II; Queen of Huahine and Mai'ao	Moeore, Tamatoa IV; King of Raiatea and Taha'a	Ta'aroari'i	Tematafainuu
Pōmare IV; Queen of Tahiti	Pōmare III; King of Tahiti	Tehaapapa II; Queen of Huahine and Mai'ao	Ariimate Teururai; King of Huahine and Mai'ao	Ma'ihara Temari'i
Tamatoa V King of Raiatea	Pōmare V King of Tahiti	Teuhe; Queen of Huahine	Tetuamarama	Marama Teururai; Prince-Regent of Huahine	Tamatoa VI; King of Raiatea and Taha'a
Teriitevaearai a Mai from the Mai family of Bora Bora	Tehaapapa III; Queen of Huahine

Notes:

Descending dotted lines denote adoptions.

References

- Henry, Teuira; Orsmond, John Muggridge (1928). Ancient Tahiti. Vol. 48. Honolulu: Bernice Pauahi Bishop Museum. pp. 247–272. OCLC 3049679.
- Newbury, Colin W.; Darling, Adam J. (December 1967). "Te Hau Pahu Rahi: Pomare II and the Concept of Interisland Government in Eastern Polynesia". The Journal of the Polynesian Society. 76 (4). Wellington: The Polynesian Society: 477–514. JSTOR 20704508. OCLC 6015244633.
- Teissier, Raoul (1978). "Chefs et notables des Établissements Français de l'Océanie au temps du protectorat: 1842–1850". Bulletin de la Société des Études Océaniennes, Issue 202. Papeete: Société des Études Océaniennes. OCLC 9510786.

Tehaapapa III Rulers of Huahine Born: 1879 Died: 1917
Preceded by Teha'apapa II	Queen of Huahine; 1893–1895	Succeeded by French Third Republic
