= Tamatoa III =

- King of Ra'iātea and Taha'a
- Reign: 1816 – 10 July 1831
- Successor: Tamatoa IV
- Born: c. 1757; Ra'iātea
- Died: 10 July 1831; Ra'iātea
- Spouse: Tūra'iari'i Ehevahine
- Issue: 1) Teri'itaria II; 2) Teritootera'i Teremo'emo'e (v.); 3) Temari'i Ma'ihara; 4) Tamatoa IV Nohora'i Moe'ore; 5) Teihotu (v.)
- House: House of Tamatoa
- Father: U'uru
- Mother: Rereao

Tamatoa III (c. 1757–1831), also known as Tapa, Fa'o, or "The Tall," was a Polynesian monarch who reigned as King of Ra'iātea and Taha'a from 1816 until his death in 1831. As part of the influential Tamatoa dynasty, he played a significant role in the political and religious transformation of the Leeward Islands during the early 19th century. Tamatoa III was instrumental in the spread of Christianity, the establishment of legal codes, and the promotion of education, aligning closely with the efforts of the London Missionary Society. He also founded the town of Uturoa, which became an important center of administration and missionary activity. His reign was marked by inter-island alliances, religious reform, and eventual conflict, culminating in his death during a military campaign in 1831.

== Family ==
According to missionaries Daniel Tyerman and George Bennet, who met him in Ra'iātea in 1822, Tamatoa III was 65 years old at the time. They recorded his height as six feet three inches, while John Williams later described him as a remarkably fine man, standing six feet eleven inches tall. Tamatoa's father, U'uru, held the title of sovereign of Ra'iātea by hereditary right. His status was symbolized by the wearing of the maro 'ura, a sacred girdle adorned with red feathers and known as Te ra'i puatata, which embodied the royal authority traditionally vested in the ari'i class of the Tamatoa lineage. By the time of James Cook's first visit to Ra'iātea in 1769, he was operating under the suzerainty of his conqueror, Puni, a prominent chief of Bora Bora, who confined his authority to the district of Opoa, located at the southeastern point of the island known as Matahira. Tamatoa III had three brothers of comparable stature and build, named Tahitoe, Faita known as Pehupehu, and Pahi. In addition, he had an elder fourth brother, Mateha. Through his marriage to Tūra'iari'i Ehevahine, Tamatoa fathered five children. On 28 November 1808, the missionary John Davies identified four of Tamatoa III's children as chiefs of Huahine. These included three daughters: Teriitaria II, Temari'i known as Ma'ihara, Teihotu and one son, Nohora'i. The latter, also known as Tinorua, would become Moe'ore later. A fourth daughter was residing in Ra'iātea with her father. This unnamed daughter living in Ra'iātea is believed to be Tetupai'a, later known as Teremo'emo'e, Teritootera'i or Teravahine. Tenani'a is described by John Davies as a young woman of the "same family." While her exact relationship to Tamatoa III is unclear in his writings, some sources report that she attended the coronation of Pomare III in 1824 alongside her sisters Teri'itaria II and Temari'i Ma'ihara.

== Chief of Opoa ==
In 1777, U'uru established his residence on the island of Huahine. His son, Tamatoa III, succeeded him as chief of Opoa, initially under the suzerainty of Puni and subsequently under that of Tapoa I. According to the testimony of Ma'i III and Tefa'aora III, recorded in 1845 by Armand Joseph Bruat, Tamatoa III was appointed as ari'i of Ra'iātea by Puni, as well as by the father of Ma'i III and the mother of Tefa'aora I, thus succeeding his own father U'uru.

== Turnbull and Buyer's Visit to Ra'iātea ==
Captain John Buyers and John Turnbull, British merchants and navigators, were the first Europeans to encounter Tamatoa at Ra'iātea in late October 1802. They recorded his name phonetically as "Tomaquoa." His consort, referred to as "Teerimonie," is likely to have been Tūraʻiari'i Ehevahine. During their visit, they were also visited by Tamatoa's father and the queen's mother. Most notably, the British observers noted the presence of Tapoa I, the principal chief of Taha'a, who customarily resided in Ra'iātea. Tapoa I was regarded as the commander-in-chief of both islands during times of war, and his authority appeared to exceed that of Tamatoa III. According to Turnbull, Bora Bora and Huahine were politically independent from Ra'iātea and Taha'a. Tamatoa had strong ties with Mahine and Tenani'a of Huahine, reinforced by shared lineage and his marriage to Tūra'iari'i Ehevahine, daughter of Teha'apapa I Tapoa I also maintained cordial relations with Mahine, whose first wife had been one of his sisters.

== Alliance with the Pōmare dynasty ==
On 14 November 1808, missionary John Davies recorded that Mahine and his brother Tenani'a formally acknowledged Teri'itaria, daughter of Tamatoa, as the supreme chief of Huahine. She had been promised in marriage to Pōmare II, reinforcing political alliances between the ruling families of the Leeward Islands and Tahiti. On 21 November 1808, Iti'a spouse of Tenani'a and formerly wife of Pōmare I, sent a message to Tahiti, inviting her son, Pōmare II, to come to Huahine and take Teri'itaria II as his wife.

== Visit to Huahine with Tapoa I ==
On 20 February 1809, Tamatoa III and Tapoa I, the two principal chiefs of the Leeward Islands, arrived in Huahine aboard two canoes accompanied by only a small retinue. The following day, they paid formal visits to the local chiefs and missionaries. Their arrival was marked by ceremonial honors, as Huahine's chiefs received them with all customary signs of respect. Among those who welcomed them, Iti'a and her husband Ari'ipaea gave particular attention to Tapoa I, presenting him with a musket and various European goods. During their stay, political discussions took place between Tapoa, Tamatoa, Mahine, Ari'ipaea, the chiefs, and Iti'a concerning the political situation of the islands. On 23 and 24 February, a hog collection was organized across Huahine Iti, the smaller of Huahine's two islands. On 25 February, Tamatoa, Tapoa, and other chiefs returned with a substantial number of hogs. Tamatoa, whose brother Mateha had been killed during the 1802 conflict in Tahiti, offered several hogs to William Henry, a close friend of the deceased. On the first Sabbath following their arrival, although a large assembly gathered for a missionary sermon, neither Tamatoa nor Tapoa attended. Tapoa, who held the role of high priest of 'Oro, remained distant from Christianity. Their visit coincided with an influx of people from Ra'iātea, and on February 28, the island's population presented gifts to the two chiefs. After nearly two weeks, Tamatoa and Tapoa departed for Ra'iātea, carrying European goods, which had been among the principal motivations for their journey

== The expeditionary force of the Leeward Islands ==
Between 1809 and 1815, Tamatoa and other chiefs of the Leeward Islands provided military support to Pōmare II, who had suffered a rebellion in early November 1808 that led him to flee to the island of Mo'orea in december of that year. By late 1810, King Pōmare II received reinforcements from the Leeward Islands in his effort to reclaim control over Tahiti. On July 12, Ma'i III and Tefa'aora I arrived at Eimeo from Bora Bora with 262 warriors. Tapoa followed on September 27, bringing 288 fighters from Ra'iātea aboard the Venus. On October 10, 199 warriors from Huahine arrived in nine canoes and one boat. Loyalist figures such as Patea (also known as Iti'a), Ūtami (Tenani'a), and others were already stationed in Tahiti to support the royal cause. Missionary James Hayward later joined Henry Nott at Mo'orea. The arrival of approximately 750 warriors constituted a powerful deterrent, significantly bolstering Pōmare II’s position and enabling the restoration of a semblance of peace without recourse to violence.

== Marriage of Teremo'emo'e ==
According to the testimonies of numerous chefs present in Mo'orea during that period, shortly after his arrival, Tapoa I reportedly proposed to Pōmare II that he marry his adoptive daughter Tetupai'a, also known as Teremo'emo'e. Her biological father was Tamatoa. Pōmare agreed to the proposal, reportedly due to the youth and beauty of the prospective bride. To mitigate the disappointment of Teri'itaria, Tamatoa's elder sister, she was granted the honorific title of Pōmare Vahine. Tamatoa III arrived later in Mo'orea, as reported by Pomare II in a letter dated January 28, 1811. In 1810, at age twenty, Pōmare Vahine (Teri'itaria II) was already recognized as the legitimate queen of Huahine. During Mahine's absence, her grandmother Teha'apapa I assumed responsibility for administering the government on her behalf. She already displayed a strong and assertive character. The renowned warrior Tapoa I had suggested to Teha'apapa that they seize the american ship Hope, commanded by Captain Chase, while it was docked at Huahine. Teri'itaria firmly refused, reminding him of her sovereignty over the island and asserting that if he wished to take such action, he should do so on the island of Ra'iātea.

== Death of Tapoa I ==
After a long period of suzerainty under Puni and Tapoa I, Tamatoa III regained full sovereignty over Ra'iātea following Tapoa I's death in late September 1812. This transition marked a significant shift in the island's leadership, restoring his autonomous rule over his ancestral domain.

== Conversion to christianism ==
In 1813, along with his wife Apari also known as Turaiari'i Ehevahine, and his brother Tahitoe, he actively participated in catechism and literacy classes conducted by missionary John Davies in Papetoai. These formative experiences deepened Tamatoa's commitment to Christianity. Upon his return to Ra'iātea on 23 July 1814, accompanied by Tahitoe and by Fenuapeho, the regent of Taha'a, he resolved to undertake the conversion of his people, becoming a fervent advocate of the Christian faith.

== Pōmare II's voyage to the Leeward Islands ==
On 5 September 1814, Tamatoa and his brother Tahitoe, having been informed by Fenuapeho, came to greet Pōmare II at Taha'a, following his arrival aboard the brig Mathilda, after drifting there from Mo'orea. Three weeks later they welcomed him at Ra'iātea and rendered him honors, after which Pōmare proceeded to Huahine. In 1845, the French claimed that the chiefs of Ra'iātea, Taha'a, Huahine, and Bora Bora had sworn allegiance to King Pōmare II during this stay in the Leeward Islands, as well as upon their arrival at Mo'orea in 1810. These arguments, however, did not convince the English, who later signed with the French the Jarnac Convention, recognizing the independence of the Leeward Islands.

== Conflict with Fenuapeho ==
Between the end of 1815 and in early 1816, idolaters allied with Fenuapeho in an effort to eradicate Tamatoa's Pure Atua, the Christian converts. Although Fenuapeho was defeated, he retained his title as chief of Tahaʻa under Tamatoa's suzerainty. Tamatoa left the vanquished chief in possession of his lands, assuming control exclusively over the governance, which he exercised until his death. Following these events, Tamatoa came to be referred to as Tapa.

== Auxiliary Missionary Society of Ra'iātea ==
On 11 September 1818, Tamatoa welcomed missionaries John Williams and Lancelot Threlkeld to Ra'iātea to promote education and Christianity. On 5 September 1819, King Tapa (Tamatoa III) was chosen to preside over the Auxiliary Society of Ra'iātea, an institution created to promote missionary endeavors. This organization, known as Te Societi Ecalesia i Ra'iātea, required each adult member to contribute annually three measures of arrowroot to aid its mission work. Tapa addressed the people saying: "Remember, what you used to do for the lying gods: you used to give all your time, strength, and property, and lifes too. Look at all the Marais you used to build for them. Then you had no property, it was all the gods. Your canoes, your pigs, your mats, your cloth, your food and all belonged to the gods. But now, all your property is your own [...] He ended his address with the words: "We cannot give money, but we will give what we have."

== Code of laws Tamatoa ==
On 11 May 1820, under the guidance of English missionaries, Tamatoa together with the chiefs of the Leeward Islands, united in promulgating a formal legal code entitled E Ture, no Ra'iātea, e no Taha'a, e no Porapora, e no Maupiti, e no te fenua ri'i ato'a i pīha'i iho ("The Laws for Ra'iātea, Taha'a, Bora Bora, Maupiti, and all the small surrounding lands"). Modeled on the 1819 Tahitian code introduced by Pōmare II, this enactment marked a decisive transition from customary oral traditions to codified legislation within the Leeward Islands. Pahi, the brother of Tamatoa, became the first chief justice of Ra'iātea. During that period, Tamatoa III was also designated as the guardian of Tapoa I's young biological son, who died in 1826.

== Restriction on porc commerce and death of Pomare II ==
In early 1821, Tamatoa opposed King Pōmare II's restrictions on porc and local goods trade in the Leeward Islands, favoring free commerce. These events unfolded during a period of growing instability for Pōmare II. Misguided commercial ventures with New South Wales traders had already burdened his kingdom. He became entangled in monopolistic practices that deprived his people of the right to sell their own goods, leading to widespread discontent. The stress of these failed speculations, compounded by habits of intemperance, weighed heavily on his health and spirit. Under this cloud of political and personal turmoil, he died on December 7, 1821, at the age of 39.

== Coronation of King Pomare III ==
In 1824, Tamatoa III attended the coronation of his grandson Pōmare III.

== Founder of Uturoa ==
In 1824, Tamatoa oversaw the founding of the town of Uturoa, formerly known as Utumaoro, thus establishing what would become the principal settlement and administrative center of Ra'iātea. On 7 June 1824, following Lancelot Threlkeld's definitive departure for New South Wales, John Williams relocated from Vaoa'ara to the newly established missionary station at Utumaoro. The new church was inaugurated on 8 February 1826.

== The Māmāiā ==
Between 1826 and 1827, a prophetic movement led by apostate Christians Tea'o and Hue disrupted Protestant congregations across Tahiti. The core of Māmāiā theology was founded on the concept of sinlessness, which implied that transgression no longer existed. Drawing from biblical teachings and personal revelations, the Māmāiā prophets challenged missionary authority and Christian law. The movement reached its peak in Maupiti in 1827, where Tau'a also known as Matapu'upu'u, a deacon from Huahine, claimed divine inspiration and incited rebellion against the London Missionary Society. Chief Ta'ero lost control of the island as calls to expel foreigners intensified. Order was eventually restored through the intervention of influential chiefs from the Leeward Islands. Tamatoa, Mahine, Ma'i III and Tefa'aora II, supported missionary George Platt, who formally reinstated the laws to Chief Ta'ero in 1829 and supervised the election of new deacons.

== Catesby visit ==
On 16 September 1826, Captain Thomas ap Catesby Jones of the United States sloop-of-war Peacock negotiated at Ra'iātea with King Tamatoa III and Fenuapeho of Taha'a, in the presence of missionary John Williams, over a treaty of friendship and commerce between the United States and the islands of Ra'iātea and Taha'a; the draft articles confirmed perpetual peace, the reception of an American consul, protection of U.S. ships and citizens, and commercial privileges, but while the chiefs signed provisions relating to trade, shipwreck assistance, prevention of desertion, and equal commerce, they withheld consent on perpetual peace and consular clauses until consulting Britain, under whose protection they considered themselves; after submitting queries about neutrality, consular conduct, colonization fears, and law enforcement, which Jones answered by emphasizing respect for sovereignty and neutrality even in case of war with Britain, an additional article was added limiting the treaty's duration to 31 December 1830 unless renewed, and in his final reply Tamatoa welcomed American ships and promised friendship but stressed neutrality in any war between Britain and the United States, reflecting both openness to American commerce and caution in preserving ties with Britain.

== Troubles at Tahiti ==
In mid-1829 Queen Pōmare IV visited the Leeward Islands with her husband Teri'inohora'i, also known as Pōmare. She resided on Ra'iātea with her grandfather Tamatoa III, while her husband remained on his native island of Taha'a, engaged in the construction of a schooner. In December 1830, as Queen Pōmare prepared to return to Tahiti via Eimeo, she summoned her husband to accompany her, but he declined, insisting on completing the vessel before departing. After repeated requests she eventually left for Mo'orea accompanied by her grandfather King Tamatoa and Mahine. Tamatoa and Mahine played central roles in the political unrest surrounding Queen Pōmare IV's attempt to revive the tribute system in December 1830. The queen's request for ceremonial cloths to honor both chiefs violated Tahitian law and provoked strong opposition from leaders who viewed the gesture as favoritism and a threat to legal norms. Mahine faced particular hostility in Mo'orea and was later accused of sedition in Tahiti, though the charges were dropped. Tamatoa's involvement also stirred resentment, with some chiefs refusing to participate in ceremonies and citing personal insults. Their presence deepened divisions between reformist and conservative factions, forcing Pōmare to retreat, negotiate with missionaries, and ultimately reinstate the laws to restore stability in early April 1831.

== Death ==
In April 1831 Fenuapeho, the guardian chief of Taha'a for Teri'inohora'i, traveled to Bora Bora in a single canoe but was lost on his return. During Tamatoa III's absence serious divisions emerged in the Leeward Islands, provoked by the treachery of several chiefs of Ra'iātea against their king. These disaffected leaders persuaded the young chief of Taha'a to detach the island from the authority of Ra'iātea and to attach it to the government of Bora Bora, as it had existed in the time of Puni and his grandfather Tapoa I. Tamatoa rejected this transfer of government and sought counsel from the chiefs, who advised reconciliation with Tapoa, but negotiations proved fruitless as neither side was willing to compromise. Tamatoa then prepared to restore the exiles of Taha'a to their ancestral lands, while Tapoa dispatched a messenger to Ma'i III and Tefa'aora II, entrusting them with the government. They subsequently conveyed this decision to Tamatoa, although the inhabitants of Taha'a refused to grant their consent. Once ready, Tamatoa led the people of Taha'a to Vaitoare, and Tapoa withdrew to Tiamahana, where he fortified his position and refused any further retreat. At this time a deacon of Ra'iātea died suddenly and Tamatoa himself fell gravely ill, necessitating his return to Ra'iātea. Tapoa, anticipating his own death, sent a messenger to Bora Bora declaring that if his allies wished to see him alive they must come immediately, for he would not flee. The appeal succeeded and numerous lesser chiefs and warriors, stirred by the message, embarked to join him. Throughout these events the principal chiefs continued to negotiate for peace with the support of the English missionaries. George Platt accompanied Teari'ifa'atau, a chief of Huahine, in his whaleboat to Taha'a where they met Tera'imano, daughter of the late Tenani'a, acting as messenger for Queen Teri'itaria II. Tapoa accepted the proposed conditions of peace and the delegation proceeded to Ra'iātea where Tamatoa lay seriously ill. After discussion he agreed to the terms. The warriors removed their cartridge boxes and laid aside their arms, and it was resolved that the kings of the five islands Huahine, Ra'iātea, Taha'a, Bora Bora and Maupiti would convene to settle the matter amicably. Teari'ifa'atau returned to Huahine and George Platt to Bora Bora hopeful that peace would prevail, accompanied by a number of Bora Borans. Within days King Tamatoa III died at Raiātea in the presence of the missionary John Williams, his family, and the chiefs of Huahine.

== Succession ==
Moe'ore succeeded his father as Tamatoa IV. His father's death provided an opportunity for disaffected elements to stir unrest once more. A messenger was dispatched claiming that Huahine intended to attack Tapoa. Although George Platt pleaded for adherence to the preliminaries of peace, a group of determined men from Bora Bora went to Taha'a under the pretext that, if the report proved false, they would return immediately. News of their arrival reached Ra'iātea and provoked agitation among those inclined to mischief. Defying the chiefs, they went to Taha'a and encountered the "Fa'anuians" or "Fa'anui", the Bora Bora people known to missionaries by that name, at Vaitoare close to the former home of missionary Robert Bourne. Fighting continued until nightfall, leaving three Ra'iāteans dead and several wounded, while the opposing side suffered two fatalities and additional injuries. Shortly after the battle, Pōmare Vahine (Teri'itaria II) and Ūtami, chief of Puna'auia and formerly of Taha'a, arrived from Tahiti to mediate a truce based on earlier negotiations. Charles Barff came from Huahine to provide support at Raiātea and Taha'a. George Platt then attempted to arrange a meeting between the two kings to reconcile their differences. When he reached Ra‘iātea, Tamatoa, formerly known as Moe‘ore, and his family were in Huahine, where his sister Pōmare Vahine lay dangerously ill, though she ultimately survived. George Platt made two attempts to reach Huahine, spending three days and a night at sea and nearly perishing in the effort. Abandoning the attempt, he remained seven weeks at the two stations before returning to Bora Bora, having achieved little beyond witnessing the devastation of a hurricane. The storm destroyed the large chapel at Ra'iātea and numerous houses, snapped maiore trees like twigs, and flattened orange groves. Upon his return to Bora Bora, George Platt found his own people on the verge of violence, attending service under arms. Only the entreaties of Mrs Charlotte Platt and the intervention of several chiefs prevented immediate conflict. Unrest soon resumed. A party from Raiātea eager for combat deceived King Tamatoa IV and Queen Teri'itaria of Huahine by pretending to go fishing on a Saturday, then crossed to Taha'a. The Fa'anuians or people of Bora Bora, occupied with preparing food for the Sabbath, were caught unawares. A battle ensued at the same site as before, resulting in the death of two people of Ra'iātea and one fatal wound, while the Fa'anuians sustained several injuries. The attackers withdrew without pursuit. A message of peace followed, but Tamatoa rejected the terms.

The final engagement took place on 3 April 1832, when Tamatoa IV, his sister Ma'ihara, and Teari'ifa'atau a chief of Huahine escorted the exiles of Taha'a, who had previously sought refuge under their protection, back to their homeland. They dispatched a messenger to Tapoa, who, together with his Fa'anui followers, was stationed in a fort at Tiamahana, situated on another part of the island facing a strategic pass. The message indicated that the people of Taha'a had regained their lands and petitioned Tapoa II to accept them and to restore the government of Taha'a. Tapoa initially responded by sending two envoys, assuring that he welcomed their peaceful return and would refrain from hostilities provided they did not attack him. Before the envoys could return, however, Tapoa was persuaded to adopt a different course of action. A group of visionaries, adherents of the Māmāiā movement who had gained considerable influence over him, prophesied favorable outcomes for Tapoa and destruction for Tamatoa and his allies. Under their guidance, Tapoa and the Fa'anuians or people of Bora Bora resolved to undertake a haru pō (night attack). The assault nearly proved disastrous for Tamatoa's party, as the assurances of Tapoa's envoys had lulled them into a false sense of security. Once they had recovered from the initial shock, the fighting intensified on both sides and continued from three o'clock in the morning until approximately ten o'clock, at which point the Fa'anuians or the people of Bora Bora were decisively defeated. Tapoa himself was wounded, and casualties were heavy on both sides, though significantly greater among Tapoa's forces. Many of the visionaries perished, having insisted that "the bullets would not enter their bodies, for God would protect them." Positioned at the front lines, they suffered severe losses, with reports indicating that more than fifty were killed. Tamatoa IV, to his credit, sought to prevent further harm to the Fa'anuians once they had surrendered. Following the battle, Tapoa II and a large number of his people were taken to Huahine until the question of governance could be resolved.

Ma'i III and several principal chiefs of Bora Bora abstained from direct participation in the war, though the entire island was implicated in its consequences. When Mahine and the people of Huahine where at Ra'iātea they only acted on the defensive for the preservation of that island. The question of governance was subsequently debated during the May 1832 meetings convened in both Ra'iātea and Huahine. Once a settlement was reached, the people of Taha'a were invited to return to their land, and the missionary James Smith was requested to reside among them. In the aftermath, envoys from each of the Leeward Islands traveled to Tahiti, where Pōmare joined with the Leeward Islands chiefs in establishing a general peace across the two island groups. The treaty stipulated that Tamatoa IV's dominions would encompass Ra'iātea and Taha'a, while Tapoa II would rule over Bora Bora and Maupiti. Furthermore, the adoption of a new legal code was agreed upon to govern these islands. Later that year, Queen Pōmare IV distanced herself from her spouse Tapoa II, and married her cousin Ari'ifa'aite. Celebrated in Mo'orea on 3 December 1832, by missionary Henry Nott, the marriage sparked intense political and social controversy in early 1833.

== Family ==
Raiatea family tree

Tamatoa I (or II)
Bora Bora family
Ari'ima'o	Rofa'i
Puni; Ariʻi Rahi of Bora Bora, Raiatea and Taha'a	Pōmare Dynasty of Tahiti	Mau'a	Tamatoa II (or III)
Teu; Ariʻi of Pare-Arue; Ariʻi of the Porionuʻu	Tetupaia i Hauiri	Mato	Vete'ara'i 'U'uru; Ariʻi rahi of Opoa
Pōmare I King of Tahiti	Tura'iari'i Ehevahine	Tamatoa III (or IV); Ari'i Rahi of Raiatea	Tahitoe Hihipo
Tapoa I Ariʻi Rahi of Bora Bora, Raiatea and Taha'a	Pōmare II; King of Tahiti	Teriʻitoʻoterai; Teremoemoe	Teriitaria II; Queen of Huahine	Teihotu Ta'avea	Moeore, Tamatoa IV; King of Raiatea	Tahitoe; King of Raiatea
Tapoa II; King of Bora Bora and Taha'a	Pōmare IV; Queen of Tahiti	Ari'ifa'aite	Ariimate Teururai; King of Huahine	Tehaapapa II; Queen of Huahine	Tehauroa; Queen of Raiatea	Tuarii; Queen of Raiatea
Pōmare V King of Tahiti	Teri'imaevarua II; Queen of Bora Bora	Tamatoa V King of Raiatea	Moe a Ma'i	Tamatoa VI; King of Raiatea
Princess Teriiourumaona _{Tahitian Heir as Pōmare VI}	Princess Teriivaetua	Teri'imaevarua III; Queen of Bora Bora	Princess Teriinavahoroa	Princess 'Aimata	Prince Tamatoa

Notes:

The numbering of the Tamatoa varies. An ancestor of the Tamatoa line named Fa'aniti is often counted as "Tamatoa I" and Moeore is sometime not considered Tamatoa IV.

References

- Cadousteau, Mai-Arii (1987). "CHAPITRE VIII: AHU'URA FILLE DU ROI MAI III". Bulletin de la Société des Études Océaniennes. 20 (239–240). Papeete: Société des Études Océaniennes: 45–50. OCLC 9510786.
- Henry, Teuira; Orsmond, John Muggridge (1928). Ancient Tahiti. Vol. 48. Honolulu: Bernice Pauahi Bishop Museum. pp. 247–272. OCLC 3049679.
- Newbury, Colin W.; Darling, Adam J. (December 1967). "Te Hau Pahu Rahi: Pomare II and the Concept of Interisland Government in Eastern Polynesia". The Journal of the Polynesian Society. 76 (4). Wellington: The Polynesian Society: 477–514. JSTOR 20704508. OCLC 6015244633.
- Orsmond, John Muggridge; Smith, S. Percy (March 1893). "The Genealogy of the Pomare Family of Tahiti, from the Papers of the Rev. J. M. Orsmond. With Notes Thereon by S. Percy Smith". The Journal of the Polynesian Society. 2 (1). Wellington: The Polynesian Society: 25–43. JSTOR 20701269. OCLC 5544732839.
- Teissier, Raoul (1978). "Chefs et notables des Établissements Français de l'Océanie au temps du protectorat: 1842–1850". Bulletin de la Société des Études Océaniennes, Issue 202. Papeete: Société des Études Océaniennes. OCLC 9510786.

Huahine family tree

Tamatoa I (or II)
Rofa'i	Ari'ima'o
Tamatoa Dynasty of Raiatea	Mau'a
Rohianu'u	Tehaapapa I Queen of Huahine and Mai'ao	Mato	Tetuaveroa
Teriitaria I King of Huahine and Mai'ao	Tenani'a; King of Huahine and Mai'ao
Pōmare Dynasty of Tahiti	Tamatoa III, King of Raiatea and Taha'a	Tura'iari'i Ehevahine	Mahine Tehei'ura; King of Huahine and Mai'ao	Tao'a
Pōmare II; King of Tahiti	Teriʻitoʻoterai; Teremoemoe	Teriitaria II; Queen of Huahine and Mai'ao	Moeore, Tamatoa IV; King of Raiatea and Taha'a	Ta'aroari'i	Tematafainuu
Pōmare IV; Queen of Tahiti	Pōmare III; King of Tahiti	Tehaapapa II; Queen of Huahine and Mai'ao	Ariimate Teururai; King of Huahine and Mai'ao	Ma'ihara Temari'i
Tamatoa V King of Raiatea	Pōmare V King of Tahiti	Teuhe; Queen of Huahine	Tetuamarama	Marama Teururai; Prince-Regent of Huahine	Tamatoa VI; King of Raiatea and Taha'a
Teriitevaearai a Mai from the Mai family of Bora Bora	Tehaapapa III; Queen of Huahine

Notes:

Descending dotted lines denote adoptions.

References

- Henry, Teuira; Orsmond, John Muggridge (1928). Ancient Tahiti. Vol. 48. Honolulu: Bernice Pauahi Bishop Museum. pp. 247–272. OCLC 3049679.
- Newbury, Colin W.; Darling, Adam J. (December 1967). "Te Hau Pahu Rahi: Pomare II and the Concept of Interisland Government in Eastern Polynesia". The Journal of the Polynesian Society. 76 (4). Wellington: The Polynesian Society: 477–514. JSTOR 20704508. OCLC 6015244633.
- Teissier, Raoul (1978). "Chefs et notables des Établissements Français de l'Océanie au temps du protectorat: 1842–1850". Bulletin de la Société des Études Océaniennes, Issue 202. Papeete: Société des Études Océaniennes. OCLC 9510786.

Regnal titles
Preceded by U'uru	King of Raiatea; 1816–1831	Succeeded by Tamatoa IV
