= Ari'imate =

King of Huahine and Maia'o
- Reign: 05 January 1852 – 07 July 1868
- Predecessor: Teriitaria II
- Successor: Queen Teha'apapa II
- Born: 1824; Tefarerii, Huahine
- Died: 14 April 1874 (aged 49-50); Tefarerii, Huahine
- Burial: Tefarerii, Huahine
- Spouse: Teha'apapa II
- Issue: Princess Temari'i Teuhe; Princess Tapiria; Regent Marama; Princess Vaira'atoa; King Tamatoa VI; Prince Teri'iteporouarai; Prince Fatino; Princess Turaiari'i; Princess Teri'inavahoro'a; Princess Tefa'aora
Names
- Teurura'i Ari'imate
- House: Teurura'i
- Father: Ta'aroaari'i a Mahine
- Mother: Tematafainu'u a Hauti'a

Ari'imate (c. 1824 – 14 April 1874), also known by the dynastic name Teurura'i, served as sovereign of the Kingdom of Huahine and Mai'ao from 5 January 1852 until his deposition on 8 July 1868. He was the founding figure of the Polynesian royal lineage known as the House of Teurura'i, which maintained authority over Huahine and Mai'ao throughout the 19th century. His name, as rendered in Tahitian, embodies a dual semantic resonance, interpreted respectively as "sovereign-demised" and "the-sky-forest", reflecting both political legacy and cultural symbolism.

== Family ==
Ari'imate Teurura'i was born in Huahine in 1824. He was the second child and the only son of Tematafainu'u vahine, daughter of Chief Hauti'a. Although the identity of his mother is clearly established, that of his father remains unknown. During his visit to Queen Teha'apapa on 16 December 1878, missionary Prosper Brun stated, "Her husband was American, I believe," referring to the late Teurura'i and implying a possible foreign paternal origin. On 9 July 1883, senior French civil servant Edouard Petit, writing under the pseudonym Aylic Marin, visited Queen Teha'apapa on the island of Huahine. In his account, Petit described the queen's two sons as exhibiting physical features he characterized as "typically American," which he attributed to historical interactions between Polynesian populations and foreign visitors, particularly from Europe and the Americas. He further suggested that Teha'apapa herself had inherited physical traits considered close to the European type, in continuity with her ancestors. In 1914, missionary Joseph Chesneau, relying on information provided by the European settler Marcantoni, reported that following the death of Ta'aroaari'i, son of Mahine, Tematafainu'u entered into a union with a "white man" and that Teurura'i was born of this relationship. In the early 1900s, it was observed that members of the royal families of Ra'iātea (Tamatoa) and Huahine exhibited light-colored eyes, often tinged with bluish hues. The death certificate of his eldest daughter, Temari'i, dated 21 August 1891, identifies Teurura'i as the son of Taaroaari'i and Tematafainu'u. In a letter dated 28 July 1852, published in the Launceston Examiner, missionary Charles Barff affirmed that Teurura'i was descended from Huahine's ruling chiefs, and that this represented the second instance in which his family had exercised supreme authority over the island. Barff argued that Teurura'i's claim to governance was at least equal to that of the former Queen Teri'itaria II, citing both dynastic and marital connections: his great-uncle had previously held power in Huahine, and his wife was the daughter of Tamatoa IV, King of Ra'iātea and Taha'a, and the niece of Queen Teri'itaria II. Teurura'i (another personage of the same name), whose brother is Mehao known as Hauti'a (c. 1780–28 June 1854) and whose father is Teuhe, descended from the nobility of Huahine, Ra'iātea, and Bora Bora, seems to match Barff's description as great-uncle of Ari'imate Teurura'i. Teuhe was a rival of Tenani'a and Ta'aroaari'i, known as Puru or Mahine. While certain early sources proposed a paternal connection between Teurura'i and Ta'aroaari'i, son of Mahine, this theory is not unanimously endorsed by historians. However, some commentators have proposed that Mahine may have legitimized Teururaʻi, which could explain why he is often presented as his grandson.

Often portrayed as a man of modest origin, despite his mother's background rooted in the traditional chieftaincies of Huahine, his intrinsic qualities that shaped his strength remain indisputable. Barff described him as a promising young man, endowed with a solid education as well as intelligence surpassing that of his contemporaries among the island's chiefs. This assessment was confirmed by George Wellesley who personally encountered Teurura'i and attested to his remarkable character and leadership.

== Founder of the Teururai dynasty ==
In August 1850, an investigative commission was established to examine six formal complaints filed against Queen Teri'itaria II and certain of her subjects, comprising representatives of the Western powers present in the Society Islands: Mr. William Cornwallis Aldham commander of HBM sloop Swift; Mr. Georges Joseph Guillaume Ernest Gizolme, commander of the steam aviso Le Cocyte, acting on behalf of the French Republic's commissioner in Tahiti, Mr. Louis Adolphe Bonard; and Mr. Edward L. Gray, United States Commercial Agent for the Society Islands. The proceedings took place from August 6 to 12, 1850, on the island of Huahine and were facilitated by missionary Charles Barff, who served as interpreter to ensure effective communication among the parties involved. George Charles Miller, Her Britannic Majesty’s Consul, was also present to observe the deliberations. The six complaints submitted were formally presented to Her Majesty the Queen on 8 August 1850. The inquiry concluded with a judgment rendered on 12 August 1850, acknowledging the payment of two hundred eighty-seven dollars made to Mr. John Brander and the restitution of property unjustly confiscated from various foreign complainants. Chief Tetoofa and the young husband of Queen Teri'itaria, were implicated in several formal complaints that had been filed. The outcome was widely regarded as disproportionately favorable to Teri'itaria, considering the severity and substantiation of the allegations against her administration. At the request of Queen Pōmare IV, Teri'itaria withdrew to Tahiti, appointing Teurura'i, grandson of Hauti'a, as her deputy on Huahine.

Teurura'i's administration was widely recognized as effective and well-received by both native communities and foreign observers. However, the resulting economic and social advancement provoked resentment among Teri'itaria and her kin. She dispatched a native chief empowered to act on her behalf, who summarily banished Teurura’i, Hauti'a, several district governors, and three of the seven judges for upholding the supremacy of the law. No formal charges were brought against them. The dismissals were attributed solely to the will of Queen Teri'itaria II. Subsequently, she issued a series of letters containing demands that were considered excessive and unlawful. These included instructions to beat native cloth, to make mats, to make barrels, to prepare ten barrels of taro paste, to fill twenty barrels with arrowroot, to fill twenty barrels with salted cuttlefish, to buy a vessel to carry five hundred barrels of oranges and the above goods to Tahiti. She also demanded the construction of a new wooden residence despite already possessing two. In addition, she sent private instructions to her representative on Huahine to banish individuals and confiscate their lands for her personal use. These actions were perceived as testing the limits of the population's tolerance for autocratic rule. Resistance emerged when the Queen's representative attempted to seize land on her behalf. The district governors, supported by the populace, successfully opposed the action and resolved to renounce their allegiance to the Queen. This decision was made spontaneously, without a formal public assembly, and was driven by sustained oppression. Another significant catalyst for unrest was the revelation that Queen Teri'itaria had previously offered Huahine to the French protectorate in exchange for a modest annual stipend. This act was described by contemporaries as "giving up her people to certain slavery to serve her personal interest," effectively compromising the island's independence. However, Governor Louis Adolphe Bonard informed her that he could not comply with her request, as the independence of her island had already been guaranteed by French authorities under the terms of the Jarnac Convention.

Following the initial upheavals, a public assembly was convened during which the majority of inhabitants endorsed the change in leadership. On 5 January 1852, Ari'imate was formally appointed sovereign under the dynastic name Teurura'i, thereby marking the ascension of his lineage to power in Huahine. New officers were chosen for the new government and the chieftainships of the districts were passed to the younger branches of the same families, with the younger brother or sister assuming the role traditionally held by the eldest. At the same time, Her Britannic Majesty's consul for Tahiti and dependencies, George Charles Miller, following consultations with the French authorities and the United States consul, submitted a formal request to George Wellesley, captain of HMS Daedalus, to proceed to the island of Huahine in order to deliver a message on behalf of the three foreign powers. On 7 January 1852, Wellesley arrived at Huahine, where he reported that the local chiefs had almost unanimously elected Teurura'i, a distant relative of Queen Teri'itaria II, to succeed her in the governance of the island. The next day, at a public gathering, Wellesley announced that Britain, France, and the United States had agreed not to intervene in the dispute. He further stated that consular authorities had instructed their nationals to refrain from involvement and emphasized that the Huahine government would be held accountable for the safety and property of foreign citizens.

The transition occurred without significant opposition. Several days were dedicated to the restitution of lands that the Queen had unjustly appropriated and distributed to her favourites. The extent of these confiscations was such that certain districts were nearly depopulated, and some landowners who had previously held a pahi, consisting of twelve parcels of land, had been entirely dispossessed. These individuals recovered the full extent of their original holdings. Queen Teri'itaria's policies toward foreign residents and traders were notably "harsh", adversely affecting the island's economic prosperity. On 10 January, almost immediately following the election of the new chiefs, Teurura'i addressed a letter to Governor Bonard, as well as to the American and British consuls, providing an account of the transition and its underlying causes. In their respective replies, all three powers assured him that they would refrain from interference and would leave the matter entirely in the hands of the local authorities and their Queen. Similar political shifts occurred on Mai'ao, Ra'iātea, and Taha'a, prompted by comparable grievances. Three days later, Queen Pōmare IV announced her intention to travel to Ra'iātea in order to depose her son Tamatoa.

Upon being informed of the situation, Queen Teri'itaria II attempted to return to Huahine but was denied entry, having declared her intent to reclaim power. She proceeded to Ra'iātea, where she was joined by Pōmare IV and her spouse, Tapoa II, and Tamatoa IV, with plans to mobilize forces from Ra'iātea and Taha'a for an assault on Huahine. However, internal unrest on those islands thwarted their efforts. Tamatoa IV's oppressive rule had provoked resistance from half the population, who sought reform rather than revolution. Tamatoa launched an assault against them, denouncing them as rebels. He was defeated with considerable losses. Thirteen of his men were killed on the spot, and three others later died from their wounds. On the side of Temari'i, the chief who defended the liberties of Ra'iātea, six individuals were killed. Immediately following the conflict, Temari'i initiated the formation of a treaty with Teurura'i and the Huahineans, both offensive and defensive in nature, aimed at preserving their shared liberties. The Huahineans consented to the terms of this alliance. The political transformation in Huahine was widely viewed as beneficial. Teurura'i was described as an educated, principled, and law-abiding leader, respected by both natives and foreigners. His administration was expected to promote both civil order and spiritual welfare. The deposition of Queen Teri'itaria II marked a significant shift in the island's governance, ending a period characterized by arbitrary rule and restoring authority to a lineage historically associated with effective leadership.

According to missionary John Barff (son of Charles Barff), the origins of these disorders were varied, though they primarily resulted from the encroachments of the supreme chiefs upon the authority traditionally held by district governors. Another contributing factor was the insecurity surrounding property rights, which stemmed from the continued practice among chiefs of taking food from the plantations of their subjects whenever they pleased. On the island of Huahine, the emergence of these difficulties was more sudden and unexpected, as the presence of numerous influential chiefs had often served to restrain the "rapacity" of the ruling power. During the administration of Maihara, the younger sister of Queen Ari'ipaea, such restraint was scarcely necessary, as her character, along with that of Mahine, ensured a mild and just government. Following their respective deaths on 16 December 1834 and 2 February 1838, governance was carried out by deputies acting in the name of Ari'ipaea, who was residing in Tahiti at the time. These deputies lacked the authority to challenge the district governors and instead focused on administering the laws and maintaining public order, which was likely the most prudent course of action under the circumstances. However, when political developments in Tahiti made Ari'ipaea's continued residence there undesirable in November 1843, she resumed direct control of the government, marking the beginning of a new phase. Her courage in resisting the French in January 1846 is well known, but it is regrettable that she did not consistently administer the laws with scrupulous fairness toward either natives or foreigners. Furthermore, her demands for traditional tributes such as cloth, pigs, mats, and other goods were notably severe and rigorous. John Barff further noted that Queen Ari'ipaea's jealousy toward Teurura'i stemmed from the fact that Temari'i, granddaughter of Mahine (also known as Ta'aroaari'i, a name shared with his son), had been superseded in her claim to the government of Huahine by Teri'itaria Terātane, the second son of Queen Pōmare IV, who had been adopted by Queen Teri'itaria. Temari'i was kept in Tahiti to prevent her from gaining political influence on Huahine. Despite these maneuvers, the local population continued to regard Teurura'i as the rightful heir.

Charles Barff confirmed in his letter dated 1 January 1835 that, following the death of Maihara on 16 December 1834, Mahine and Hauti'a selected Temari'i, who was twelve years old at the time, to succeed her as head of the government of Huahine. On 22 October 1835, Daniel Wheeler, a British Quaker missionary, referred to Temari'i as the young "Queen Ma'ihara." He observed that she was expected to assume full control of the island of Huahine the following week. Wheeler further noted that her husband (Ari'ipeu a Hiro) was the brother of the consort of Pōmare IV, the reigning Queen of Tahiti.

== Moresby's visit ==
On 18 July 1852, Rear Admiral Fairfax Moresby visited Huahine, where he reaffirmed British support for the island's sovereignty, emphasized a stance of non-interference in its internal governance, and announced the appointment of Busvargus Toup Nicolas as British Consul to the Leeward Islands, with the aim of strengthening diplomatic and commercial ties with the government of Queen Victoria.

== Otare's rebellion ==
In mid-August, following the passage of Rear Admiral Moresby, Captain Edmond de Bovis, a French naval officer, landed on the island of Huahine, ostensibly engaged in the innocuous task of procuring poultry. He was accompanied by Paoa'a, a rebel chief previously exiled to Tahiti, whose status he claimed to be unaware of. Shortly after their departure, the island experienced a sudden outbreak of political unrest. A young chief named Otare, who also held the office of fa'atere hau or Prime Minister, sought to assume control of the government. He was supported by four districts collectively known as Namaeha'arua, meaning "the two twins," which had previously played a role in deposing Queen Teri'itaria II and installing Teurura'i. These districts now aligned with Otare in an effort to remove both leaders and elevate him under the title Kiaumarama, meaning "reign of the moon." To achieve his objective, Otare began to nullify existing laws and permitted morally disreputable individuals to engage in drunkenness and lewd dancing. He secretly dispatched messengers to gather armed supporters in Maeva, his ancestral district, where they fortified themselves and continued their unlawful activities day and night.

Once his preparations were complete, Otare seized control of the government and attempted to force Teurura'i and his supporters into submission. Teurura'i, supported by eight (sic six) loyal districts, was compelled to organize a defensive response. The opposing factions clashed in the district of Maeva along the narrow strip of Lake Fa'una Nui, a site where native forces had previously engaged French troops. Despite Teurura'i's repeated efforts to negotiate, including sending messengers several times a day over multiple days, the rebel faction refused any form of dialogue and insisted on armed conflict. On the morning of 29 September 1852, the rebels launched an ambush against Teurura'i's forces. The attack was repelled through a coordinated counteroffensive from both the front and rear, resulting in a decisive victory within approximately two hours. The rebels surrendered and fled. One individual was killed on the royal side, while two members of the rebel faction were mortally wounded and later died. Otare and several ringleaders were exiled to Ra'iātea and Tahiti, while others were pardoned after paying fines and pledging allegiance to Teurura'i.

== Paoa'a's rebellion ==
Captain Edmond de Bovis returned once more to Huahine and, with marked courtesy, convened a public assembly during which he conveyed that the French government was highly satisfied with reports of Teururai's effective governance and expressed its willingness to maintain amicable relations with him. He further denounced the insurgents at Maeva, characterizing them as reprehensible elements who had disrupted the established order. Concurrently, Bovis engaged in private discussions with supporters of Teri'itaria Teratane, encouraging Teururai to permit the return of Paoa'a, now presented as a reconciled ally. On 31 October 1852, shortly after Bovis's departure for Tahiti, Paoa'a and another rebel leader formally submitted their allegiance in writing. Following consultation with his advisors, Teururai authorized their return and received them with clemency. However, this submission proved insincere: upon his arrival, Paoa'a discreetly began assembling a faction and orchestrated the dispatch of a confidential envoy to Ra'iātea, where he successfully persuaded the exiled rebels to return under cover of night by canoe. On 18 December 1852, the rebels constructed an embankment and launched an assault against Teurura'i's forces. Hostilities continued until 11 January 1853, when both parties, having failed to achieve a decisive victory, reached an agreement stipulating that Teri'itaria Terātane, adoptive son of Ari'ipaea, and Teururai would henceforth be recognized as equal in rank and authority, each acknowledged as the sovereign leader of their respective constituencies. This proposal was accepted by Teurura'i, and a formal treaty was drafted and signed by both parties. Copies of the agreement were transmitted to Governor, Théogène François Page, as well as to foreign consuls. Following the conclusion of the treaty, each party was represented by ten district chiefs and one sovereign, thereby establishing a dual administrative structure within each district of Huahine. The island henceforth recognized two reigning authorities: Teurura'i and Teri'itaria Terātane son of Queen Pōmare IV.

== Nicolas's visit ==
On 16 February 1853, Her Britannic Majesty's steam sloop Virago arrived at Huahine, bringing Busvargus Toup Nicolas, the British consul of the Leeward Islands. At a public assembly, the chiefs and people of Huahine warmly welcomed the consul. However, opposition soon emerged from the party loyal to Teri'itaria Terātane. They raised objections, first expressing concern that the French might react unfavorably to the British consul residing on the island without prior authorization. Secondly, they refused to collectively grant Queen Victoria a parcel of land for the consul's use, insisting instead that it be rented. On 28 February, the impasse was resolved through the intervention of Teurura'i's wife, Teha'apapa, who generously donated a portion of her own land, Tahateao, located near the valley of Ha'amene, to all the chiefs and people of Huahine. Acting in full accord, they signed a formal document granting the land to Queen Victoria in perpetuity for the use of her consuls. On 2 March, Consul Nicolas hoisted the British flag on the designated land, which Teurura'i and his supporters honored with a 21-gun salute. Although Teri'itaria Terātane's party had initially agreed to participate and had prepared their artillery, they withdrew upon sighting a vessel entering the harbor under the French flag. The ship was identified as the Sultana, a small warship commanded by Captain Perchappe. On 3 March, Captain Perchappe of the French vessel convened a public assembly, inviting missionary Charles Barff to serve as interpreter. The captain conveyed two inquiries from Governor Page: first, whether the treaty dated 11 January 1853 had been ratified by all Huahineans and whether they intended to uphold it; second, whether both factions would pledge to abstain from further conflict should Teri'itaria Terātane return. Affirmative responses were given to both questions. Revised copies of the treaty, now incorporating the formal pledge, were duly signed and disseminated among the involved parties as well as Governor Théogène François Page.

== The final battle ==
On 15 June 1853, a French steamer transported Teri'itaria Terātane and his guardian Ari'ipaea to Huahine to assume leadership over their supporters. Shortly thereafter, in August 1853, Ari'ipaea, addressed a letter to Admiral Auguste Febvrier Despointes as he passed through the Leeward Islands en route to take possession of New Caledonia. In her letter, she explicitly requested that France establish a protectorate over Huahine. According to her own words, she wished to "place the government upon the head of one of Pōmare's sons and create for him a protection similar to that which Tahiti enjoyed." She further asserted, "Understand clearly the meaning of my words, ô Admiral, because I am myself queen of this island by right, and from ancient times until today, there has been no king above me, nor any other king but myself." This appeal, however, ultimately yielded no result, due to the constraints imposed by the Jarnac Convention.

According to missionary Charles Barff's account, the treaty and pledge were disregarded. Ari'ipaea issued repeated threats of attack against Teurura'i, culminating in a coordinated assault on 18 March 1854 targeting three strategic positions occupied by Teurura'i's followers. The attack involved the simultaneous use of incendiary tactics and armed force. Despite being numerically inferior, Teurura'i's forces responded with resolve and repelled the offensive. The Teri'itarian faction suffered nine fatalities and ten injuries, while Teurura'i's group reported no deaths and six recoveries from minor wounds. On 19 March, Paoa'a, acting as Teri'itaria Terātane's messenger, appeared and surrendered unconditionally. He handed over all weapons, gunpowder, and other military supplies to Teurura'i's forces. On 26 March, a French steamer transported Teri'itaria Terātane, Ari'ipaea, and their followers to Tahiti as prisoners of war. Teurura'i was subsequently recognized as the sole sovereign of Huahine and Mai'ao. Barff described him as a devout and intelligent leader. Despite the political upheaval, the local church remained resilient, with eight deacons and over two hundred members maintaining their commitment.

Huahine family tree

Tamatoa I (or II)
Rofa'i	Ari'ima'o
Tamatoa Dynasty of Raiatea	Mau'a
Rohianu'u	Tehaapapa I Queen of Huahine and Mai'ao	Mato	Tetuaveroa
Teriitaria I King of Huahine and Mai'ao	Tenani'a; King of Huahine and Mai'ao
Pōmare Dynasty of Tahiti	Tamatoa III, King of Raiatea and Taha'a	Tura'iari'i Ehevahine	Mahine Tehei'ura; King of Huahine and Mai'ao	Tao'a
Pōmare II; King of Tahiti	Teriʻitoʻoterai; Teremoemoe	Teriitaria II; Queen of Huahine and Mai'ao	Moeore, Tamatoa IV; King of Raiatea and Taha'a	Ta'aroari'i	Tematafainuu
Pōmare IV; Queen of Tahiti	Pōmare III; King of Tahiti	Tehaapapa II; Queen of Huahine and Mai'ao	Ariimate Teururai; King of Huahine and Mai'ao	Ma'ihara Temari'i
Tamatoa V King of Raiatea	Pōmare V King of Tahiti	Teuhe; Queen of Huahine	Tetuamarama	Marama Teururai; Prince-Regent of Huahine	Tamatoa VI; King of Raiatea and Taha'a
Teriitevaearai a Mai from the Mai family of Bora Bora	Tehaapapa III; Queen of Huahine

Notes:

Descending dotted lines denote adoptions.

References

- Henry, Teuira; Orsmond, John Muggridge (1928). Ancient Tahiti. Vol. 48. Honolulu: Bernice Pauahi Bishop Museum. pp. 247–272. OCLC 3049679.
- Newbury, Colin W.; Darling, Adam J. (December 1967). "Te Hau Pahu Rahi: Pomare II and the Concept of Interisland Government in Eastern Polynesia". The Journal of the Polynesian Society. 76 (4). Wellington: The Polynesian Society: 477–514. JSTOR 20704508. OCLC 6015244633.
- Teissier, Raoul (1978). "Chefs et notables des Établissements Français de l'Océanie au temps du protectorat: 1842–1850". Bulletin de la Société des Études Océaniennes, Issue 202. Papeete: Société des Études Océaniennes. OCLC 9510786.

== Marriage and children ==
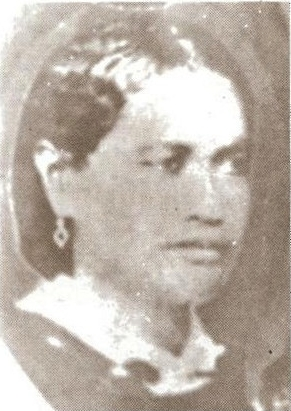
His second daughter Princess Tapiria or Terereraatua Teururai who was adopted by Ari'ipeu a Hiro

Ari'imate married Princess Maerehia of Ra'iātea and Taha'a in 1838. Together, they had twelve children, two of whom died in infancy.

- Princess Temarii a Teururai (1848–1891), also known as Maihara or Teuhe the rebel Queen of Huahine.
- Princess Tapiria a Teururai (1850–1888). She was adopted by Ariipeu a Hiro, whose wife, Temarii, was the granddaughter of Mahine and Hautia.
- Crown Prince Tefaatau Marama a Teururai (1851–1909), Head of the royal family of Huahine and father of Teha'apapa III.
- Princess Vairaatoa a Teururai, she had issue.
- Prince Ioata, Ariimate, Teururai a Teururai (1853–1905), also known as Teururai Teuhe a Teururai or Tamatoa VI, last king of Ra'iātea and Taha'a and then chief of the district of Tefarerii under the name Ioata. He had six children, one of whom died in early childhood.
- Prince Teriiteporouarai a Teururai (1857–1899), his family established in Tahiti.
- Prince Fatino, Maraetaata a Teururai (1859–1884), he had eight children.
- Princess Turaiarii, Haamairia a Teururai (1862–?), she had two children through an irregular union.
- Princess Teriinavahoroa a Teururai (1863–1918), she had eleven children.
- Princess Tefaaora a Teururai (1868–1928), she had three children.

The matrimonial alliances of King Ari'imate's children reflect the strategic importance of dynastic unions in strengthening ties between Polynesian royal houses during the 19th century. Temarii (the future Teuhe), the eldest daughter of Teurura'i, married Teratane Teriitaria, Heir apparent to the throne of Tahiti and eldest surviving son of Queen Pōmare IV, on 11 November 1857 in Huahine. The couple had two children, including a daughter named Tenani'a, who died in early childhood. The marriage was short-lived and was officially dissolved by a ruling of the Tahitian High Court on August 5, 1861.

Teururai Teuhe, subsequently known as Tamatoa VI and second son of King Ari'imate, married Tetuanuimarama, daughter of Atitioroi and granddaughter of Ori, chief of Papeno'o. Ori was himself the son of the distinguished chief Tati of the Teva i uta clan of Papara, a lineage of considerable political and cultural prominence in Tahitian society. The marriage was solemnized on 29 December 1870 in Fare, Huahine, and was reportedly a momentous occasion, as noted by the missionary Alfred T. Saville, who officiated the ceremony. This matrimonial alliance had been the subject of preliminary negotiations with the family of Papeno'o. Tetuanuimarama was born on 9 may 1858 in Ra'iātea according to her birth certificate.

Tefaatau Marama the elder son of Ari'imate was married to Tetuamarama daughter of Teuruarii King of Rurutu at the end of March 1877 by the missionary Albert Pearse. His marriage also served as the occasion for a major celebration on the island of Huahine. He remarried Tetuanuimarama a Atitioroi, the widow of his late brother, on April 30, 1907, in the district of Tefarerii, according to information extracted from the marriage certificate.

Since the end of the monarchy, the descendants of Ari'imate and Teha'apapa have remained members of the royal family of the former kingdoms of Huahine-Maia'o and Ra'iātea-Taha'a; among their ten children, only Temarii and Tapiria currently have no recorded descendants.

== Deposition ==
On 7 July 1868, Ari'imate was deposed during a nocturnal assembly in which he was formally judged by the chiefs of Huahine. He was accused of having violated the island's traditional laws of hospitality by signing an agreement with the French authorities that stipulated the extradition of any individual seeking refuge in Huahine to escape colonial justice. On 8 July 1868, his wife Maerehia was proclaimed Queen of Huahine and Mai'ao. She exercised sovereign authority under the regnal title Teha'apapa. On 28 December 1892, she abdicated and proposed her granddaughter as successor. She died on 28 May 1893, and her funeral was held on 4 July 1893.

== Death ==
Ari'imate died at Huahine on 14 April 1874 and was buried in Tefarerii.

== Ancestry ==
Ancestors of Ari'imate

16. The Hon. Chief Mau'a of Huahine
8. The Hon. Chief Mato of Ra'iatea
17. The Hon. Chiefess Tetuanuimarama of Huahine
4. The Hon. Chief Mahine Teheiura Puru of Huahine
18. The Hon. Chief Mo'ohono of Huahine
9. The Hon. Chiefess Tetuaveroa of Huahine
2. The Hon. Chief Taaroaari'i of Huahine
10. The Hon. Chief of Fareihi
5. The Hon. Chiefess Tao'a of Fareihi
1. Teurura'i Ari'imate, King of Huahine
6. The Hon. Chief Hauti'a of Huahine
3. Tematafainu'u vahine
7. Taura'a

== See also ==
- List of monarchs of Huahine
- List of monarchs of Tahiti
- List of monarchs who lost their thrones in the 19th century (Rai'atea)

Ari'imate Rulers of Huahine Born: 1824 Died: 1874
Preceded by Teritaria II	King of Huahine; 1852–1868	Succeeded by Teha'apapa II
