= Tehaapapa II =

Teha'apapa II
- Queen regnant of Huahine
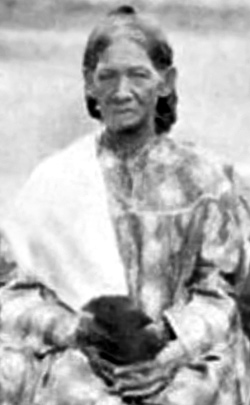

Queen of Huahine and Maia'o
- Reign: 8 July 1868 – 28 May 1893
- Predecessor: Ari'imate
- Successor: Tehaapapa III

Queen consort of Huahine and Maia'o
- Tenure: 5 January 1852 – 7 July 1868
- Predecessor: Teri'itaria II
- Successor: Tehaapapa II
- Born: 1824; Opoa, Raiatea
- Died: May 28, 1893 (aged 68-69); Fare, Huahine
- Burial: Fare
- Spouse: King Ari'imate
- Issue: Teuhe; Princess Tapiria; Marama Teururai; Princess Vaira'atoa; Tamatoa VI; Prince Teri'iteporouarai; Prince Fatino; Princess Turaiari'i; Princess Teri'inavahoro'a; Princess Tefa'aora
Names
- Princess Tehaapapa, Maerehia of Rai'atea and Taha'a
- House: House of Teururai
- Father: Tamatoa IV of Ra'iatea and Taha'a
- Mother: Mahuti of Vaiari (in Tahiti)

Maerehia of Ra'iatea and Taha'a (1824 – 28 May 1893), was a princess of Raiatea and Tahaa from the Tamatoa dynasty family, a Polynesian royal family. She was wife of Ari'imate of Huahine, founder of the Teururai dynasty which reigned on the Tahitian island of Huahine and Maia'o during the 19th century. She was Queen of Huahine and Maia'o and later Queen regnant in her own right. Contemporary sources seems to call her Teha'apapa I instead, disregarding the ruling queen by the same name at the time Captain Cook visited the island.

She was installed as Queen of Huahine in 1868 until her death in 1893.

== Background ==
Born in Raiatea, princess Maerehia (Mary) was the only surviving daughter of King Tamatoa of Ra'iatea (1797–1857) and his commoner wife Mahuti of Vaiari. Thus, she belongs to the Tamatoa family, the most powerful royal family of the Society Island.

By her father's other elder sister, Queen consort Tere-moe-moe of Tahiti, she is the first cousin to Queen Pomare of Tahiti.

== Queen consort ==
On December 26, 1851, the chiefs, the nobility and the people of Huahine dethroned her father's elder sister, Teri'itaria II who ruled in defiance of the laws and continued year after year to pursue the path of tyranny until let the patience of the people run out. The main dignitaries chose chief Ari'imate also called Teururai to be king of Huahine and Maia'ao on January 5, 1852. Princess Maerehia became queen consort.

Multiple unrest followed the election of Teururai until March 18, 1854, when the rebels supporting the fallen queen submitted to his government. Teriitaria II and her adopted son Teratane Teriitaria Pomare were banished to Tahiti on the 26 March 1854.

== Queen regnant ==
There was an ancient tradition in Huahine which granted the right of asylum to anyone seeking refuge on this island. On July 3, 1868, Ari'imate and the chiefs had agreed to sign a treaty with the French governor of Tahiti, Mr. Émile de la Roncière, to deliver any escaped prisoners from Tahiti. The agreement also extended to 6 or 7 Chinese contract workers who had escaped from this island. A reward of $50 was offered per person delivered with the added bonus of gifts. Two Chinese were delivered by the people on July 5, 1868, and the population promised to deliver the others as soon as they were captured. Ari'imate left for Tahiti with the China men aboard the French steamship Guichen to join some members of his family who he had to bring back to Huahine. At a meeting held on the night of July 7, 1868, the chiefs decided to depose King Ari'imate for fear of war. Part of the population was unhappy with the king's decision to hand over the Chinese and accused him of having sold the government of Huahine to the French. On the other hand, the chiefs had been manipulated by an opponent of the king named Vaaie. On July 8, 1868, Maerehia was proclaimed queen of Huahine and Mai'ao

On July 10, 1868, a new government was installed and new chiefs were appointed. A conflict based on maintaining or breaking the agreement with the French took place on the island. On July 17, 1868, a good part of the population was in favor of handing over the Chinese. The new chiefs initially opposed to this, agreed to side with the opinion of the people, but part of the population and particularly those who held the chinese, were opposed to this measure. Many people demanded that the old government be restored. Both parties prepared to defend themselves with arms.

On July 21, 1868, Ari'imate landed on the island of Huahine and was informed that he was deposed. The following day, the new government changed its mind and decided to retain the Chinese and requested Ariimate to become the Prime Minister, but he refused to take the office. There was a strong feeling in favor of Ariimate among the people. On July 23, 1868, the old government rose against the new government. The latter wrote a letter to the governor of Tahiti asking him to cancel the recently signed treaty in order to avoid war, without taking into account the opinion of the population. A messenger went to each of the villages to gather the people, and early in the morning it was expected to come across Vaaie and his group, responsible for all the unrest on the island of Huahine. On July 24, 1868, in order to avoid an unnecessary war for his people, Ari'imate accepted the sanction of the chiefs and a lasting peace was established on the island.

Maerehia took the reign name of Teha'apapa II.

In 1890, she accepted the French protectorate on her kingdom and died among her family in 1893. Her granddaughter Teriinavahoroa succeeded her under the name of Teha'apapa III.

== Marriage and issue ==
She married in 1838 Chief Ari'imate of Tefarerii, and had twelve children, two of whom died at a young age :

- Princess Temari'i Teururai (1838–1891), the future rebel queen Teuhe of Huahine.
- Princess Tapiria Teururai (1850–1888)
- Crown Prince Marama Teururai (1851–1909), Head of the royal family of Huahine and father of Queen Teha'apapa III of Huahine.
- Princess Vaira'atoa Teururai, she had issue three children's.
- Prince Ari'imate Teururai (1853–1905), or Tamatoa VI, last king of Ra'iatea and Taha'a.
- Prince Teri'iteporouara'i Teururai (1857–1899), His family established in Tahiti.
- Prince Fatino Maraeta'ata Teururai (1859–1904), He had issue eight children.
- Princess Turaiari'i Teururai (1862-1893), she had issue two children through an irregular union.
- Princess Teri'inavahoro'a Teururai (1863–1918), she had eleven children.
- Princess Tefa'aora Teururai (1870–1928), she had issue two daughters.

Their children remain member to the royal family of the former kingdom of Huahine-Maia'o and Ra'iatea-Taha'a since the end of the monarchy.

== Ancestry ==
Ancestors of Tehaapapa II

8. Vetearaʻi Uʻuru, Chief by hereditary rights of Opoa district at Raʻiatea
4. Tamatoa III, Tapa King of Raʻiatea and Tahaʻa
9. Rereao
2. Tamatoa IV, Moeore King of Raʻiatea and Tahaʻa
10. Mato of Raiatea
5. Turaiarii of Huahine
11. Tehaapapa I, Teioatua, Teriitaria Queen of Huahine
1. Tehaʻapapa II, Queen of Huahine and Maiʻao
6. Chief Tiahu of Vaiari or Papeari
3. Mahuti

== Family ==
Huahine family tree

Tamatoa I (or II)
Rofa'i	Ari'ima'o
Tamatoa Dynasty of Raiatea	Mau'a
Rohianu'u	Tehaapapa I Queen of Huahine and Mai'ao	Mato	Tetuaveroa
Teriitaria I King of Huahine and Mai'ao	Tenani'a; King of Huahine and Mai'ao
Pōmare Dynasty of Tahiti	Tamatoa III, King of Raiatea and Taha'a	Tura'iari'i Ehevahine	Mahine Tehei'ura; King of Huahine and Mai'ao	Tao'a
Pōmare II; King of Tahiti	Teriʻitoʻoterai; Teremoemoe	Teriitaria II; Queen of Huahine and Mai'ao	Moeore, Tamatoa IV; King of Raiatea and Taha'a	Ta'aroari'i	Tematafainuu
Pōmare IV; Queen of Tahiti	Pōmare III; King of Tahiti	Tehaapapa II; Queen of Huahine and Mai'ao	Ariimate Teururai; King of Huahine and Mai'ao	Ma'ihara Temari'i
Tamatoa V King of Raiatea	Pōmare V King of Tahiti	Teuhe; Queen of Huahine	Tetuamarama	Marama Teururai; Prince-Regent of Huahine	Tamatoa VI; King of Raiatea and Taha'a
Teriitevaearai a Mai from the Mai family of Bora Bora	Tehaapapa III; Queen of Huahine

Notes:

Descending dotted lines denote adoptions.

References

- Henry, Teuira; Orsmond, John Muggridge (1928). Ancient Tahiti. Vol. 48. Honolulu: Bernice Pauahi Bishop Museum. pp. 247–272. OCLC 3049679.
- Newbury, Colin W.; Darling, Adam J. (December 1967). "Te Hau Pahu Rahi: Pomare II and the Concept of Interisland Government in Eastern Polynesia". The Journal of the Polynesian Society. 76 (4). Wellington: The Polynesian Society: 477–514. JSTOR 20704508. OCLC 6015244633.
- Teissier, Raoul (1978). "Chefs et notables des Établissements Français de l'Océanie au temps du protectorat: 1842–1850". Bulletin de la Société des Études Océaniennes, Issue 202. Papeete: Société des Études Océaniennes. OCLC 9510786.

== See also ==
- List of monarchs of Tahiti
- French Polynesia
- List of monarchs who lost their thrones in the 19th century

Tehaapapa II Rulers of Huahine Born: 1824 Died: 1893
Preceded by Ari'imate	Queen of Huahine; 1868–1893	Succeeded by Tehaapapa III
