= George Platt (missionary) =

English missionary (1789–1865)

George Platt (1789–1865) was an English missionary associated with the London Missionary Society (LMS) who served in the South Pacific for nearly five decades during the 19th century.

== Biography ==
Born on March 15, 1789, in Arnfield, near Tintwistle, Platt was a devoted church member in Tintwistle and studied in Manchester before being appointed as a missionary to the South Seas. He was ordained at Surrey Chapel on September 30, 1816, and shortly after, he married and departed for his mission on November 17, 1816.

Platt arrived in Moorea on November 17, 1817, where he worked in the district of Papetoai (also known as Roby's Place) alongside fellow missionary William Henry until 1824. That year, he moved to Bora Bora, replacing missionary John Muggridge Orsmond. His missionary efforts extended beyond these islands, as he undertook a voyage from December 18, 1829, to March 2, 1830, visiting the Hervey Islands and the Austral Islands.

From August 18, 1835, to August 11, 1836, Platt was away on a visit to Hervey Islands and Samoa, accompanied by Samuel Wilson (son of Charles Wilson), where he helped prepare for the arrival of newly appointed missionaries. Before his departure, his family was relocated to Raiatea under the protection of Tamatoa III due to the unstable conditions in Bora Bora. Upon his return to Raiatea on August 20, 1836, he made that island his permanent station.

On 18 November 1850, George platt wrote: "This day 33 years ago we landed on Eimeo to commence our labours. Of all our company only two remain, Mr. Barff and myself. On a review of the many islands which have since that time received the gospel, we have reason, with amazement, to say, What hath God wrought !!!"

Mrs. Platt died in Raiatea on October 13, 1854. In March 1856, Platt traveled to England, arriving on September 6, 1856, before returning to Raiatea in August 1859. He continued his mission there until his death on April 4, 1865, at the age of 76. He left three sons, one daughter, and a sister, aged seventy‑three years, residing in Ra'iātea. A day of mourning was proclaimed by His Majesty King Tamatoa V. Teratane later Pomare V, the governors (Te feia mana) and the population likewise came to render him homage.
