= Tehaapapa =

Tehaapapa may refer to:

- Tehaapapa I (c. 1735–1790), Queen of Huahine and Maiao
- Tehaapapa II (1824–1893), Queen of Huahine and Maiao
- Tehaapapa III (1879–1917), Queen of Huahine and Maiao
