= House of Teururai =

Royal family of Huahine and Maia'o, 1852–1895

- Parent house: Tamatoa Dynasty
- Country: Huahine-Maia'o, Raiatea-Tahaa
- Founded: 1852
- Founder: Ari'imate, king of Huahine
- Final ruler: Huahine and Maia'o: Queen Teha'apapa III (1895) Raiatea and Tahaa: King Tamatoa VI (1888)
- Titles: Sovereign of Huahine and Maia'o; Sovereign of Raiatea and Tahaa
- Estates: Huahine and Maia'o, Raiatea and Tahaa
- Deposition: Huahine and Maia'o: 1895 : Annexation by French Third Republic Raiatea and Tahaa: 1888 : Annexation by French Third Republic

The House of Teururai was the reigning family of the kingdom of Huahine and Maia'o between Ari'imate's coronation in 1852 and Teha'apapa III's cession of the kingdom to France in 1895. Teururai kings first ruled Huahine in the middle of the 19th century. By the end 19th century, a member of the Teururai dynasty also held thrones in Raiatea.

Teururai monarchs ruled Huahine and Maia'o (from 1852) and Raiatea (from 1885) until French annexation. The cadet line, the elected monarch of Raiatea, was deposed in 1888; whereas the senior line, the monarch of Huahine, ruled until being deposed in 1895.

Ari'imate was the first Teururai ruler of Huahine and Maia'o, from 1852. The Teururai is closely related to the other Tahitian royal dynasty as the Royal family of Tahiti, then to the Royal family of Raiatea. From this Huahinean line comes the last royal line of Raiatea and Tahaa.

== Origins ==

The House of Teururai was originally a noble family from a chiefdom of Huahine.

=== The House of Teururai ===
In 1840, Chief Ari'imate of Huahine, only grandson of the governor of Huahine, married Princess Maerehia of Raiatea, only daughter and thus heiress to the King Tamatoa of Raiatea and Tahaa.

The senior line of the Teururai remained, the ruling house of Huahine until 1895. This line was represented by Prince Marama, eldest son of King Ari'imate, through his eldest daughter, Queen Tehaapapa, the last sovereign of Huahine. He was regent to his Queen-daughter.

== Teururai of Raiatea and Tahaa ==
The Raiatea line of the House of Teururai was founded and represented by Tamatoa VI. Indeed, the younger brother of Prince Marama, Prince Ari'imate was designated King of Raiatea and Tahaa in 1884 and crowned in 1885. He was deposed by French in 1888. He became the last monarch of Raiatea and Tahaa. His descendant remains the royal family of Raiatea.

== List of Teururai rulers ==
=== Monarchs of Huahine and Maia'o ===
Dates indicate reigns, not lifetimes.

- King Ari'imate (1852–1868)
- Queen Teha'apapa II (1868–1893)
- Queen Teha'apapa III (1893–1895)
- Queen Teuhe, in rebellion (1888–1890)
  - Prince Marama (Regent) (1884–1895)

=== Monarchs of Raiatea and Tahaa ===
Dates indicates reigns, not lifetime.

- King Tamatoa VI (1885–1888)

== Legitimist claimants ==
=== Heads of the Huahine House of Teururai (since 1895) ===
- Crown Prince Tefaatau Marama (1851–1909) and his three daughters' descent:
  - Her Majesty Queen Teha'apapa (1879–1917).
  - Her Highness Princess Teanuinuiata (1881–1940).
  - Her Highness Princess Tetuamarama (1893–1919).
- King Tamatoa VI (1853–1905) and his lineage:
  - His Highness Crown Prince Tamatoa of Raiatea and Tahaa
  - Prince Opuhara Pehupehu Teururai
  - Princess Tevahinehaamoetua Teururai
  - Princess Teriivanaaiterai Teururai
  - Prince Mahinetaaroaarii Tevaearai Teururai
  - Prince Tefauvero Teururai
- Princess Vairaatoa Teururai, she had issue three children's.
- Prince Teriiteporouarai Teururai (1857–1899), His family established in Tahiti.
- Prince Fatino Teururai (1859–1904), He had issue eight children.
- Princess Turaiarii Teururai (1862–1893), she had issue two children through an irregular union.
- Princess Teriinavahoroa Teururai (1863–1918), she had eleven children.
- Princess Tefaaora Teururai (1870–1928), she had issue two daughters.

=== Claimants to the Raiatea crown ===
==== Heads of the House of Teururai ====
- King Tamatoa VI and his lineage:
  - His Highness Crown Prince Tamatoa Teururai of Raiatea and Tahaa (1886–1950)
  - Prince Opuhara Pehupehu Teururai (1890–1918)
  - Princess Tevahinehaamoetua Teururai (1892–1959)
  - Princess Teriivanaaiterai Teururai (1895–1947)
  - Prince Mahinetaaroaarii Tevaearai Teururai (1894–1947)
  - Prince Tefauvero Teururai (1888–1899)

==== Others royal claimants ====
- The Pomare royal family of Tahiti.
- The other descendants of the first's Tamatoa sovereign of Raiatea and Tahaa.
