= Marama Teururai =

Regent Marama
- Regent of Huahine

Regent of Huahine
- Reign: 18 March 1884 – 15 September 1895
- Predecessor: None
- Successor: Monarchy abolished in 1895 for French Third Republic
- Born: 17 December 1851; Téfareri'i, Huahine
- Died: 7 June 1909 (aged 57); Faré, Huahine
- Burial: Téfareri'i, Huahiné
- Spouse: Princess Tétuanuimarama of Rurutu
- Issue: Queen Teha'apapa of Huhaine; Princess Teanuinuiata Teururai; Princess Tétuamarama Teururai
Names
- Prince Marama Té-u-ru-ra-i of Huahine
- House: House of Teurura'i
- Father: King Ari'imate Teururai of Huahine
- Mother: Queen Teha'apapa II of Huahine

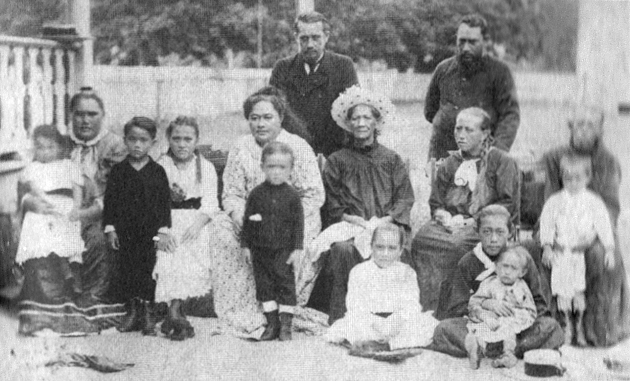
Marama Teururai (standing right) and his family, c. 1890

Prince Marama Teururai later known as Regent Marama (17 December 1851 – 7 June 1909) was a member of a Tahitian royal family (House of Teururai) which reigned on the Tahitian island of Huahine during the 19th century.

He was designated as a crown prince of Huahine when his father became king of Huahine in 1852. He never became king of Huahine.

== Biography ==
Prince Marama Teururai was born at Huahine in 1851.

He was the second son of King Ari'imate. His mother, Princess Maerehia Teha'apapa of Raiatea, was the only living child of King Tamatoa IV of Raiatea. She became Queen regnant of Huahine under the reign name of Teha'apapa II after her husband was deposed in 1868.

== Regency ==
He succeeded his younger brother as prime minister to their mother Queen Teha'apapa in 1884. He acted also as Regent from 1884 to 1895.

He accepted the French protectorate on the kingdom in 1890, became regent from 1893 to 1895 to his eldest daughter Queen Teha'apapa, the last sovereign.

He finally signed the annexation of his State in favor of France which annexed his kingdom on 1897.

== Marriage and issue ==
He married Princess Tetuamarama of Rurutu (1857–1919) (eldest daughter of the King Teuruarii III of Rurutu and his wife Tematarurai'i) and had eight children but only three of them let a descendant:

- Tehaapapa III – Last Queen of Huahine
- Her Highness Princess Teanuinuiata – she had ten legitimate children
- Her Highness Princess Tetuamarama – she had six legitimate children

Their children remain the pretendant to the royal family of Huahine since the end of the monarchy on this island.

Regent Marama died at Huahine in 1909.

== Ancestry ==
Ancestors of Marama Teururai

16. The Hon. Chief Mato Teri'i-te Po Are'i of Ra'iatea and Huahine
8. The Hon. Chief Mahine Te-hei-'ura of Huahine
17. The Hon. Chiefess Te-tu-ave-roa of Huahine
4. The Hon. Chief Ta'aroa-ri'i of Huahine
18. The Hon. Chief of Fareihi
9. The Hon. Chiefess Tao'a of Fareihi
2. King Ari'imate of Huahine
10. Me-hao
5. Té-mata-fainu'u vahine
11. Taura'a
1. Marama, Regent of Huahine
24. King Tamatoa III of Ra'iatea and Taha'a
12. Prince Vetea-ra'i U'uru of Ra'iatea, The Hon. Chief of Opoa
25. The Hon. Chiefess Hapaitaha'a of Hauiri
6. King Tamatoa IV of Rai'atea and Taha'a
26. The Hon. Chief Uruatu of Bora Bora
13. The Hon. Chiefess Opai-pai Te-roro of Bora Bora
27. The Hon. Chiefess Teri'i Iti
3. Princess Maerehia of Rai'atea and Taha'a
14. The Hon. Chief of Vaiari
7. The Hon. Mahuti of Vaiari

== See also ==
- French Polynesia
- Annexation of the Leeward Islands
- List of monarchs of Huahine
- List of monarchs of Tahiti
- List of monarchs who lost their thrones in the 19th century

== External links and sources ==
- Tahiti, les temps et les pouvoirs. Pour une anthropologie historique du Tahiti post-européen, Paris, ORSTOM, 543 p., Jean-François BARE.
- Trois ans chez les Canaques. Odyssée d'un Neuchâtelois autour du monde. Lausanne, Payot & Co Éditeurs, 342p., Eugène HANNI.
- Tahiti aux temps anciens (traduction française de Bertrand Jaunez, Pars, Musée de l'Homme, Société des Océanistes, 671p. (édition originale Ancient Tahiti, Honolulu 1928) de Teuira Henry.
