= Arnfield =

Coordinates: 53.476°N 1.974°W

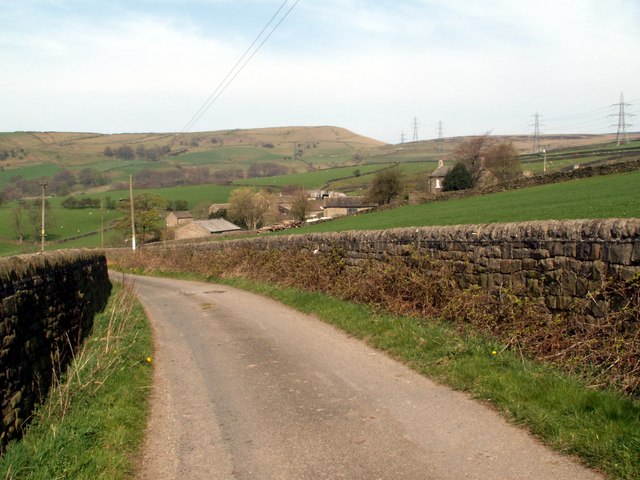
- Arnfield Lane

- Location within Derbyshire
- OS grid reference: SK018976
- District: High Peak
- Shire county: Derbyshire
- Region: East Midlands
- Country: England
- Sovereign state: United Kingdom
- Post town: GLOSSOP
- Postcode district: SK13
- Police: Derbyshire
- Fire: Derbyshire
- Ambulance: North West

Arnfield is an area of Derbyshire, England. It is located on the north side of Tintwistle (where the population is included), adjacent to the Arnfield Reservoir.
