= Teuhe =

- Queen regnant of Huahine (in rebellion)

Queen of Huahine and Maia'o
- Reign: 18 March 1888 – 22 July 1890
- Predecessor: Teha'apapa II
- Successor: Teha'apapa II
- Born: 1838; Tefareri'i, Huahine
- Died: August 21, 1891 (aged 50–51); Papeete, Tahiti
- Burial: Arue, Tahiti
- Spouse: Pōmare V Afaiau Tatahi
Names
- Princess Temari'i Teuhe Teurura'i
- House: House of Teurura'i
- Father: Ari'imate
- Mother: Teha'apapa II

Temari'i a Teurura'i (1838–1891), also known as Ma'ihara or Teuhe, was a Polynesian queen who ruled the Kingdom of Huahine and Maiʻao from 18 March 1888 to 22 July 1890 under the royal title Teuhe, sometimes recorded as Teuhe II. She was a member of the prominent Teurura'i family of Huahine.

== Family ==
She was born at Huahine, in 1838 and was the eldest daughter of Queen Teha'apapa II and King Ari'imate of Huahine.

== Marriage ==
She married Ari'iaue Pomare a Tu, King of Tahiti and eldest surviving son of Queen Pōmare IV, on 11 November 1857, in Huahine. However, the union was short-lived, and they divorced on 5 August 1861.

== Queen of Huahine and Mai'ao ==
She was proclaimed Queen Teuhe on 22 February 1888, during an insurrection against France. On 22 July 1890, she was deposed by her brother Marama and exiled to Tahiti, where she sought protection from her former husband, Pomare V. She died without issue at Papeete on 21 August 1891.

== Ancestry ==
Ancestors of Teuhe

16. The Hon. Chief Mato Teri'itepoare'i of Raʻiātea and Huahine
8. The Hon. Chief Mahine Tehei'ura of Huahine
17. The Hon. Chiefess Tetuaveroa of Huahine
4. The Hon. Chief Ta'aroari'i of Huahine
18. The Hon. Chief of Fareihi
9. The Hon. Chiefess Tao'a of Fareihi
2. King Ari'imate of Huahine
10. Mehao
5. Tematafainu'u vahine
11. Taura'a
1. Queen Teuhe II of Huahine
24. King Tamatoa III of Raʻiātea and Taha'a
12. Prince Veteara'i U'uru of Raʻiātea, The Hon. Chief of Opoa
25. The Hon. Chiefess Hapaitaha'a of Hauiri
6. King Tamatoa IV of Rai'atea and Taha'a
26. The Hon. Chief Uruatu of Bora- Bora
13. The Hon. Chiefess Opaipai Teroro of Bora-Bora
27. The Hon. Chiefess Teriʻ Iti
3. Princess Maerehia of Raʻiātea and Taha'a
14. The Hon. Chief of Vaiari
7. The Hon. Mahuti of Vaiari

== See also ==
- French Polynesia
- Annexation of the Leeward Islands
- List of monarchs who lost their thrones in the 19th century

Teuhe Rulers of Huahine Born: 1848 Died: 1891
Preceded by Tehaapapa II	Queen of Huahine; 1888–1890	Succeeded by Tehaapapa II
