= Tamatoa IV =

- King of Raiatea and Tahaa
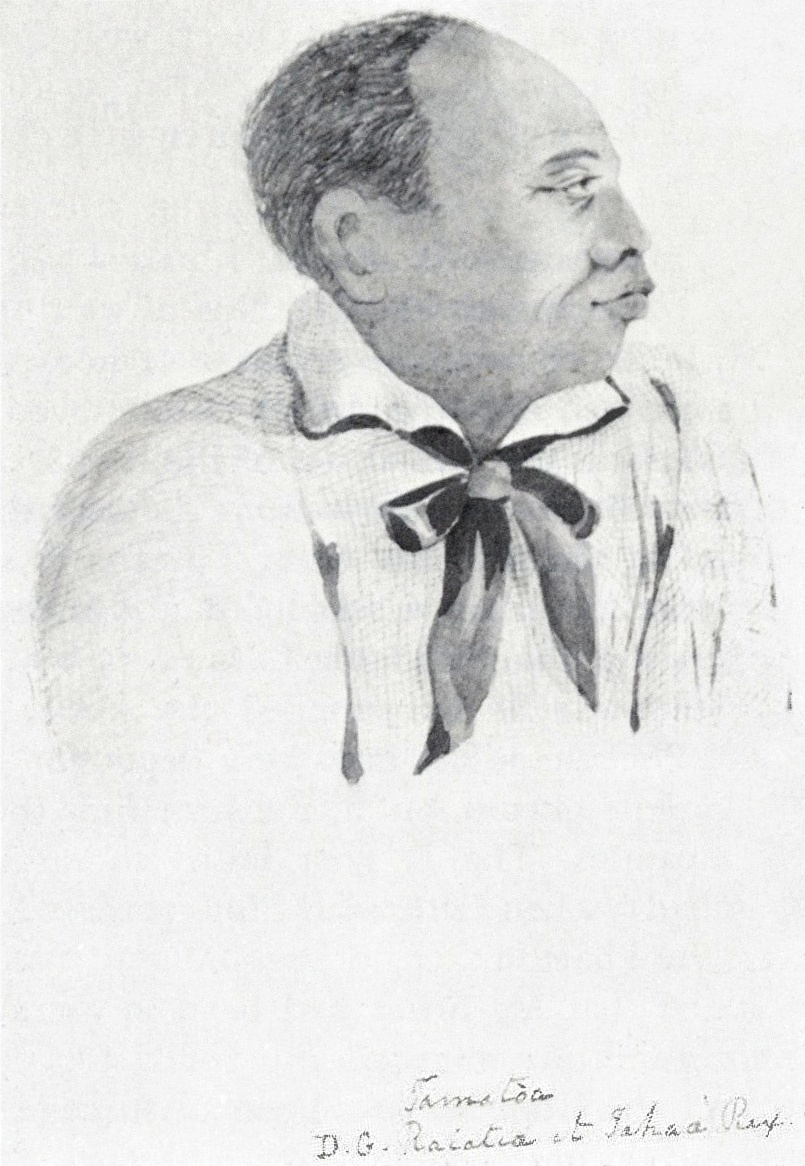
- Reign: 10 July 1831 – 23 May 1857
- Coronation: 8 June 1838
- Predecessor: Tamatoa III
- Successor: Tamatoa V
- Born: 1797; Opoa, Raiatea
- Died: 23 May 1857 (aged 59-60); Uturoa
- Burial: Opoa
- Spouse: Mahuti Haruapōatevaruametua
- Issue: 1) Prince Tamatoa the lame 2) Prince Faʻaoromai; 3) Princess Maerehia; 4) Princess Hapaitahaʻa
Names
- Moe'ore Teri'itinorua Teari'inohora'i
- Father: Tamatoa III, Ariʻi of Opoa
- Mother: Turaiari'i

Tamatoa IV (1797–1857), also known as Moe'ore Teri'itinorua Teari'inohora'i, was the King of Ra'iātea and Taha'a from 1831 until his death in 1857. He played a significant role in the sociopolitical history of the Leeward Islands during a period marked by conflicts and political transformations.

Born around 1797, Tamatoa IV grew up on the island of Huahine alongside influential figures such as his sister Teri'itaria II, his maternal uncles Mahine and Tenani'a, his maternal grandmother Teha'apapa I, and the chief Hauti'a. Upon succeeding his father, Tamatoa III, in June 1831, he defended Ra'iātea and Taha'a against an attempt by Tapoa II to annex Taha'a under the governance of Bora Bora. The conflict ended on 3 March 1832 with the defeat of Tapoa, and a peace plan was subsequently established in mid‑1832 among the chiefs of the Leeward Islands, with the consent of Queen Pōmare IV. The years that followed were marked by widespread alcohol abuse.

In 1836, new legal codes were promulgated. Moe'ore was officially crowned King of Ra'iātea and Taha'a under the name Tamatoa IV in 1838, while Tapoa II was proclaimed King of Bora Bora and Maupiti in 1840 under the name Teari'imaevarua. In July 1844, Tamatoa IV granted political asylum to Queen Pōmare of Tahiti during the Franco-Tahitian War. During that period, he adopted her son Tamatoa as his heir, bypassing his own children. His reign was marked by significant political shifts, including confrontations with his rival Temari'i in 1853 and a brief period of deposition before his reinstatement in 1855. Tamatoa IV's rule ended with his death on May 23, 1857. He was succeeded by his adopted son, who ascended the throne as Tamatoa V.

== The alliance with the Pōmare ==
Moe'ore was born in circa 1797. He grew up on Huahine alongside his sisters, including Teri'itaria II. The latter had been recognized as ari'i rahi or supreme chief of the island of Huahine, under the protection of her uncle Puru, also known as Mahine. In November 1808, a military and matrimonial alliance was concluded between the Tamatoa of Huahine and Ra'iātea and the Pōmare family. On 21 November 1808, a message was sent to Pōmare II by his mother, Iti'a, urging him to take Teri'itaria as his wife. Ultimately, he married her younger sister Teremo'emo'e in late 1810 on the basis of beauty, while Teri'itaria inherited the honorific title of Pōmare Vahine.

== The conflict with Fenuapeho ==
At the fall of the idols, between the end of 1815 and the beginning of the year 1816, a battle took place at Ra'iātea between Tamatoa III, who supported Christianity, and the fanatics of idolatry who allied themselves with Fenuapeho the chief of Taha'a who was also the regent of Pōmare or Teri'inohorai the grandson of Tapoa I. The latter having died at the end of September 1812 in Tahiti. Fenuapeho was defeated but he was allowed to keep his title of chief and regent of Taha'a. Tamatoa III became the supreme chief or king of the united kingdom of Raʻiātea and Taha'a.

== Chief of Atea in Tefareri'i ==
In 1818, Teri'itaria II was head of the ten chiefdoms or districts of Huahine. Moe'ore and his sister Ma'ihara were chiefs of the Atea and Ama districts respectively. Mahine and Hauti'a also called Hivaha were the two principal chiefs of Huahine's eight traditional districts, each with its own chief.

== The conflict with Tapoa II. Death of Tamatoa III. Battles of Vaitoare ==
In the month of April 1831, Fenuapeho died at sea and the government fell into the hands of the young Pōmare who became Tapoa II. The latter had meanwhile become the husband of Queen Pōmare IV. Tamatoa III was betrayed by some Ra'iātea chiefs who were also right-hand men of missionary John Williams in the Ra'iātea church. They persuaded Tapoa to withdraw Taha'a from the government of Ra'iātea and to attach it to that of Bora Bora, as had been the case in former times. Tamatoa III rejected the proposed alteration of the government and moved to Vaitoare, on the island of Taha'a, where he undertook the re-establishment of families who had previously been expelled from their lands by Tapoa II. He suddenly fell ill and was forced to return to Ra'iātea to be cared for by missionary John Williams who assisted to his death in June 1831.

The transition of power from Tamatoa III to his only son Moeore was confirmed by missionary George Platt, who wrote : "Tamatoa (Moeore was)". He opposed the change of government, leading to three battles on the island of Taha'a, the final one being particularly devastating, resulting in the loss of many warriors. Moe'ore was supported by the chiefs of Huahine and Ra'iātea, while Tapoa II was backed by his followers from Taha'a and the chiefs Ma'i III and Tefa'aora II from Bora Bora. Ma'i III resided in the great valley of Fa'anui. He was considered an outlaw chief given to idolatry, ancestral customs, and alcohol. Tefa'aora a Ma'i (not to be confused with Tefa'aora II) a descendant of Puni and spouse of Ahu'ura was his son in law. On 3 April 1832, Tapoa II was completely defeated and wounded in a fierce battle at Vaitoare on the island of Taha'a. Upwards of fifty men were killed during the clash. He was then banished to the island of Huahine.

In May 1832, Queen Pōmare IV united to the chiefs of the Leeward Islands in establishing a general peace. The treaty stipulated that Tamatoa IV's dominions would include Ra'iātea and Taha'a, while Tapoa II's dominions would encompass Bora Bora and Maupiti. Additionally, the adoption of a new code of laws was decided to govern these islands. Subsequently, Queen Pōmare separated herself from her husband, Tapoa II, and married her cousinAri'ifa'aite. His mother was Moe'ore's sister, called Teihotu, and his father was Hiro from Huahine. The mariage was celebrated by "archbishop" Henry Nott at the beginning of December 1832.

== Post-war drinking period ==
Moe'ore was a very dissipated young man when he succeeded to the government of Ra'iātea and Taha'a. Instead of following his father's good example he sanctioned the introduction of ardent spirits Shortly after the May meeting, the banful effects of the late commotions on the moral habits of the people became manifest to such an extent that the settlement of Ra'iātea became an entire scene of brutal intoxication with every attendant vice. Native stills were erected all round the island. This state of things was suffered by the chiefs of the island. All laws were laid aside. The missionary John Williams, returning from Rarotonga, used his influence to stem the scourge of alcoholism, but without success. Ma'ihara the sister of Moe'ore on hearing of the state of things, came down from Huahine with her people. They went round the island and helped to destroy all the stills which in number were found to be about twenty. At the end of the year 1834, missionaries reported that the people of Ra'iātea were in a shocking state of irreligion and deep wickedness. In Bora Bora, they observed that there was no government worthy of the name. Everyone did what seemed right to them. They distilled and drank, which was their main concern. They had begun to kill each other and to dance the hura. The tūtae 'āuri peu, in other words, the old customs, had returned. Ma'i III and two or three former deacons were the ringleaders of this disorder.

== Strengthening of alcohol legislation ==
In an article published anonymously by an English missionary in The Colonist newspaper, it was reported that anarchy reigned in the Leeward Islands and that the laws had been strengthened. However, while the population was punished, the high-ranking chiefs remained above the law.

Thee missionaries arrived at Huahine on 10 October 1834, where they were welcomed by their colleague, Charles Barff. The following day, they visited Tamatoa IV and Ma'ihara, the sister of Teri'itaria (She should not be confused with the young Ma'ihara, born at the end of the year 1821, also known as Temari'i, the granddaughter of Mahine). She was running the government on behalf of her sister, Teri'itaria II, the legitimate queen of Huahine. She had become a great invalid after the last war against Tapoa II. Her husband was called No. While walking through the settlement, the missionaries were deeply saddened to see many of the natives selling their oil and arrowroot for rum. Intoxication was widespread whenever spirits were available. A few days before Barff's departure for Ra'iātea, a public meeting was held to discuss the prohibition of spirituous liquors. The final decision was to take time to consider the matter rather than rushing into banning something so highly sought after by the natives.

On 17 October 1834, at Ra'iātea, the missionaries paid their respects to Tamatoa IV, King of Ra'iātea and Taha'a, and Ma'i III, one of the principal chiefs of Bora Bora. The two had just arrived from Taha'a, on their way from Bora Bora. Since Ma'i III had been a leader of the opposing faction in the recent war, Tamatoa IV had traveled to Bora Bora to reconcile with him and prevent future conflict. The scene was truly distressing. These two prominent figures, who should have set an example for the people, were so intoxicated that they barely knew what was happening. Upon their landing, numerous muskets were fired, supposedly in honor of the chief from Bora Bora. A bottle of rum was handed to them, causing a scramble among the people eager for a share. The gunfire seemed to serve a dual purpose, not only to honor Ma'i but also to showcase military strength and discourage him from future aggression. The contrast between past and present was stark: not a single decent house remained, the people were ragged and dirty, and many were intoxicated. On 23 October, five young women were tried for boarding a ship at night. Found guilty by a jury of violating the seventh commandment, each was sentenced to pay five hogs to the King and to contribute five fathoms of labor to the public road. On 27 October 1834, fifteen girls were tried for boarding a ship, while two men and one woman faced judgment for being intoxicated on the Sabbath. Although King Tamatoa IV Moeore had committed the same offense, no one dared to testify against him, leaving him unpunished. The people were increasingly frustrated with his behavior and awaited the right moment to remove him from power, as his conduct was widely condemned as disgraceful. At the end of October 1835, it was unanimously agreed to prohibit the use of ardent spirits on Taha'a and Ra'iātea.

== Coronation of Tamatoa and Tapoa ==
A new code of laws was promulgated on 23 March 1836. This code of laws was entitled : "O Tamatoa, raua o Teari'imaevarua : E ture no Ra'iātea, no Taha'a, no Borabora, e no Maupiti. I fa'atia fa'ahouhia i te hau o Tamatoa, raua o Teari'imaevarua. Mati 23, 1836." Two coronation ceremonies were subsequently celebrated. The first took place on 8 June 1838 at Ra'iātea, where Moe'ore was installed as King of Ra'iātea and Taha'a under the regnal name Tamatoa IV. The second was held on 30 September 1840 at Bora Bora, when Tapoa II was consecrated as King of Bora Bora and Maupiti, assuming the name Teari'imaevarua, with the formal consent of Ma'i III and Tefa'aora II. Nunue, Ativahia, Tevaitapu, Amanahune, Anau, and Tipoto, representing the six unified districts of Bora Bora, also known as Fa'anui e ono, were invited to the ceremony and presented offerings.

== Franco-Tahitian war and adoption of Queen Pomare IV's son ==
In mid-July 1844, Moe'ore granted political asylum to his niece Queen Pōmare IV of Tahiti, who had been completely stripped of her territory's internal sovereignty by French Rear Admiral Abel Aubert du Petit-Thouars. This act led to the Franco-Tahitian War. Tamatoa IV, Teriitaria II, and Teariimaevarua had to endure the attempts to establish a French protectorate in the Leeward Islands and support Queen Pōmare IV until June 19, 1847, when the Jarnac Convention was signed, through which both England and France pledged not to establish a protectorate over these islands. Queen Pōmare was later reinstated in her kingdom of Tahiti and its dependencies. As a gesture to the enduring nature of the hau feti'i, the traditional alliance of the chiefly families of the Society Islands, Tamatoa IV adopted Queen Pomare IV's third son Tamatoa V as heir to the throne of Ra'iātea and Taha'a.

== Conflict with chief Tamari'i ==
Over time, by 1852, Tamatoa had succeeded in removing all the hereditary governors of the districts except for one, replacing them with his own supporters and thereby establishing the hau Ra'iātea. Although the people had agreed to a yearly tax for his support, Tamatoa continued to seize food from their plantations at will and eventually sought a pretext to depose the last remaining district governor, Temari'i. Determined to resist rather than be removed, Temari'i took a stand, and the people rallied behind him in defense of the hau Ra'iātea. Among Tamatoa's allies was his sister, Teri'itaria II, who had previously been deposed in Huahine by Teururai. Hoping to reclaim power with her brother's help, she led forces on his behalf, but her efforts were not enough to prevent defeat in a decisive battle that took place on 24 March 1852, at Tevaitoa near the marae Tainu'u. Tamatoa was defeated and forced to comply with the rebels' demands. The reformed hau Raiatea government was formally established, limiting Tamatoa's authority to his hereditary district of Opoa. He was also compelled to return all the land he had previously seized to distribute among his family members. Despite this setback, Tamatoa, at the instigation of young Tamatoa (Pomare’s third son)' reestablished the hau ari'i in his hereditary district of Opoa. However, the reformed hau Ra'iātea government continued to govern the rest of the island and throughout Taha'a, with Tamatoa IV recognized as its head and Temari'i serving as the fa'atere Hau (prime minister or executive chief)

== Banishement to the island of Huahine ==
After restoring the « hau Ari'i » government or family government in his own district of Opoa, Tamatoa, who allied himself with the dissatisfied faction, sought to regain power and opposed the rebel Temari'i, who was defending the hau Raiatea. A clash took place on 23 August 1853, during which Tamatoa Moe'ore was defeated, taken prisoner, and his village of Opoa burned to the ground. On 30 August 1853, at a popular meeting attended by Busvargus Toup Nicolas (son of John Toup Nicolas), English consul to the Leeward Islands, he was deposed and sentenced to banishment to the island of Huahine. Temari'i was then elected King of Ra'iātea and Taha'a.

== The Revolt of Chief Teamo ==
On August 14, 1854, having learned of a plot to depose him, Temari'i launched a surprise attack on the chief Teamo. The latter was forced, along with several of his men, to take refuge aboard the French protectorate schooner la Joséphine. Thanks to the active interference of la Joséphine's captain, Captain Connoly of HMS Amphitrite and the English consul Mr. Busvargus Toup Nicolas, the insurrection was suppressed. Teamo and his men were saved, tried and banished to Tahiti.

== Back to power and death ==
In April 1855, the chiefs, dissatisfied with King Temarii's mismanagement of the government, decided to judge and depose him. The people of Taha'a expressed their desire to have their own king while those of Ra'iātea argued that they would not achieve this without war. The chiefs of Taha'a gave themselves a period of reflection. On 4 June 1855, Moe'ore was recalled by the populace to assume the reins of government as king over both Ra'iātea and Taha'a. His accession restored order and led to the consolidation and reinforcement of the laws. King Tamatoa Moe'ore died on 23 May 23 in Uturoa and was buried in Opoa. He was succeeded by his adopted son who reigned as Tamatoa V.

Regnal titles
Preceded by Tamatoa III	King of Raiatea; 1831–1857	Succeeded by Tamatoa V
