= Charles Barff (missionary) =

English missionary (1791–1866)

Charles Barff (1791–1866) was an English missionary who played a significant role in spreading Christianity throughout the South Pacific. His missionary efforts contributed to the cultural and religious transformation of Polynesia in the 19th century.

== Early life and missionary calling ==
Charles Barff was baptized at South Cave on 11 September 1791, the son of Robert Barff and Jane Grasby. The Barff family had long-standing ties to the region, with records of landholding in nearby Broomfleet dating back to 1651, including property known as “Barff Close” in a deed of 1758. Barff is known to have been raised largely under the care of his grandmother at Newbald. He later became associated with the Fish Street Congregational Church in Hull, where the minister was George Lambert, a founding member of the London Missionary Society.

== Missionary appointment and voyage ==
By 1811, Charles Barff was a member of Surrey Chapel in London, under the ministry of Rowland Hill, a founder of the London Missionary Society. Around this time he married Sarah Swain, a member of The Tabernacle congregation led by Rev. Matthew Wilks, another prominent figure in the Society. Accepted by the Directors of the London Missionary Society and designated for service in the Society Islands, Barff was formally set apart for missionary work at a meeting in London on 5 February 1816. He and his wife departed England on 14 July 1816, reaching Rio de Janeiro on 16 September, Sydney on 20 December, and finally arriving at Mo'orea on 17 November 1817.

== Settlement in Huahine ==
In July 1818, Charles Barff relocated to Huahine, which became his permanent mission station. He initially devoted himself to work in the schools before turning to agricultural projects. Barff trained local inhabitants to clear land and cultivate crops such as coffee, sugar cane, and cotton, all while continuing his regular preaching and pastoral duties. By 1821, Charles Barff and fellow missionary William Ellis were the only London Missionary Society representatives stationed on Huahine, then home to about two thousand inhabitants, most living near the mission station. In a letter dated 17 June 1821, they reported positively to the Society's Directors in London on the progress of their work across all areas. In subsequent years, Barff continued to send regular reports, consistently describing the mission's success and the gradual improvement in the social and spiritual condition of the island's population.

== Missionary travels and influence ==
Throughout his career, Barff was actively involved in missionary expeditions across the Pacific Islands. In 1830, he accompanied John Williams on a voyage to the Hervey Islands, Samoa, and the Friendly Islands, departing from Raiatea on May 24 and returning in September. Between May 11 and June 26, 1834, he visited Aitutaki and Samoa, further strengthening missionary efforts in the region. In October 1835, Barff accompanied Daniel Wheeler and his son, members of the Society of Friends, to Raiatea, Taha'a, and Bora Bora. He also played a role in the expansion of missionary activities in Samoa, accompanying newly appointed missionaries there on May 17, 1836, before returning to Huahine on August 19.

== Political context and support for the sovereignty of the Leeward Islands ==
Barff also defended the independence of the Leeward Islands. On November 21, 1845, in Raiatea, George Seymour declared before Kings Tamatoa IV, Tapoa II, and Queen Pōmare IV that Her Majesty's Government considered the acts establishing the French Protectorate in the Leeward Islands to be invalid until the doubts regarding their independence had been resolved. The day before, on November 20, 1845, in Huahine, Barff presented him with a letter along with copies of laws and port regulations enacted by their rulers from 1820 to 1845, affirming the independence of the Leeward Islands.

== Brief return to England ==
At the end of 1846, after nearly three decades of missionary service in the Society Islands, Charles Barff left Huahine on furlough and returned to England with his wife. They arrived on 16 May 1847, but after only a few months departed once more for the Pacific. The couple reached Huahine again on 29 April 1848, resuming their work on the island.

== Witness of the dynastic change in Huahine ==
Between the end of 1851 and 1854, Charles Barff witnessed a major dynastic shift on Huahine. During this period Queen Teri'itaria II's influence declined, while Ari'imate (Teurura'i) rose to prominence. Barff’s long presence on the island placed him as a direct observer of this transition, which marked an important stage in Huahine’s political and religious history. With his strong command of the Tahitian language, he also served as an interpreter for King Ari'imate.

== Time of enforced rest ==
Charles Barff continued his missionary work on Huahine until 1855, when he retired due to ill health. After a period of rest his condition improved, and according to the Journals of the London Missionary Society he was reinstated to full duties in July 1859. In 1860, he moved to Taha'a to oversee the missionary training institution, but he returned to Huahine a few months later.

== Final years and death ==
In 1864, after forty-seven years of missionary service, Charles Barff retired and prepared to settle in Sydney, New South Wales. He and his family embarked on the John Williams, the first missionary ship of that name. They departed Ra'iātea on 23 March 1864, but he ship was however wrecked on Danger Island on 16 May. Although all passengers and crew survived, their belongings were lost. Captain Turpie and six sailors undertook a 400‑mile voyage in an open boat to Samoa to seek assistance, and a month later the stranded party was rescued and taken to Samoa.

Barff and his wife stayed for several weeks with fellow missionary Rev. George Turner before continuing to Sydney. During the voyage he suffered a paralytic stroke, from which he never fully recovered. He died on 23 June 1866. Barff was remembered with deep respect and affection by his colleagues, who regarded him as a devoted and cheerful servant of the mission. He left descendants throughout Polynesia and beyond its borders.
