= Opoa =

Ōpoā
- Associated commune of Taputapuātea
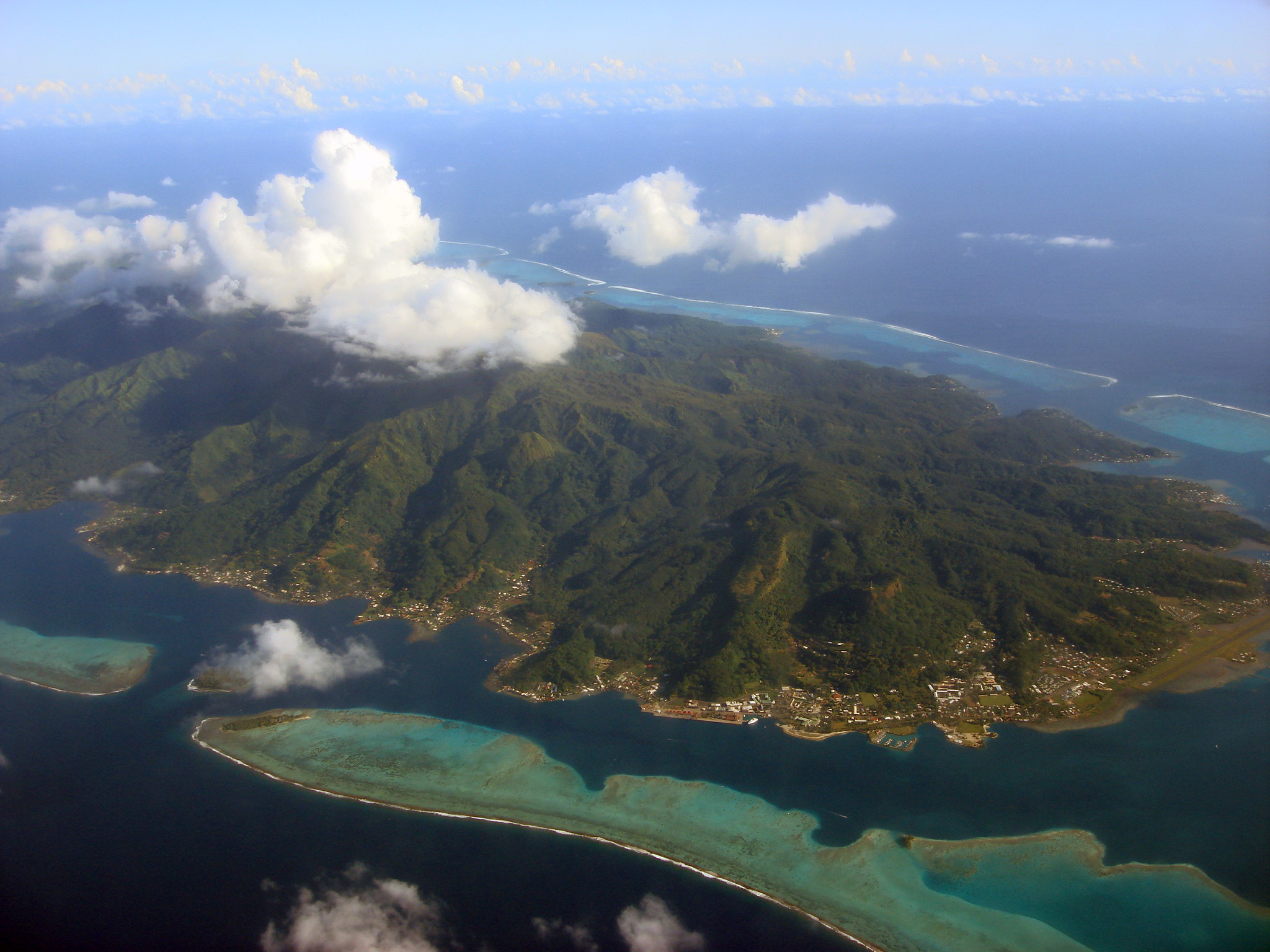
- Raiatea, the island on which Ōpoā is located

- Location within French Polynesia
- Location of Ōpoā
- Coordinates: 16°50′8″S 151°21′55″W
- Country: France
- Overseas collectivity: French Polynesia
- Subdivision: Leeward Islands
- Commune: Taputapuātea
- Elevation: 8 m (26 ft)
- Population (2022): 1,205
- Time zone: UTC−10:00

Ōpoā is a village on the island of Raiatea, in French Polynesia. According to the 2022 census, it had a population of 1,205.

== Geography ==
=== Climate ===
Ōpoā has a tropical rainforest climate (Köppen climate classification Af). The average annual temperature in Ōpoā is 26.6 °C (79.9 °F). The average annual rainfall is 3,686.8 mm (145.15 in) with December as the wettest month. The temperatures are highest on average in March, at around 27.7 °C (81.9 °F), and lowest in August, at around 25.4 °C (77.7 °F). The highest temperature ever recorded in Ōpoā was 35.2 °C (95.4 °F) on 12 January 1998; the coldest temperature ever recorded was 16.5 °C (61.7 °F) on 13 September 2002.

Climate data for Ōpoā (1991–2020 averages, extremes 1991−present)
Month	Jan	Feb	Mar	Apr	May	Jun	Jul	Aug	Sep	Oct	Nov	Dec	Year
Record high °C (°F)	35.2 (95.4)	34.5 (94.1)	35.0 (95.0)	35.0 (95.0)	33.8 (92.8)	33.7 (92.7)	32.5 (90.5)	32.1 (89.8)	32.4 (90.3)	33.0 (91.4)	34.0 (93.2)	34.5 (94.1)	35.2 (95.4)
Mean daily maximum °C (°F)	31.4 (88.5)	31.5 (88.7)	31.9 (89.4)	31.6 (88.9)	30.8 (87.4)	29.9 (85.8)	29.5 (85.1)	29.3 (84.7)	29.6 (85.3)	30.1 (86.2)	30.8 (87.4)	31.0 (87.8)	30.6 (87.1)
Daily mean °C (°F)	27.3 (81.1)	27.4 (81.3)	27.7 (81.9)	27.5 (81.5)	26.8 (80.2)	26.0 (78.8)	25.6 (78.1)	25.4 (77.7)	25.7 (78.3)	26.2 (79.2)	26.9 (80.4)	27.1 (80.8)	26.6 (79.9)
Mean daily minimum °C (°F)	23.2 (73.8)	23.3 (73.9)	23.4 (74.1)	23.3 (73.9)	22.9 (73.2)	22.1 (71.8)	21.7 (71.1)	21.4 (70.5)	21.8 (71.2)	22.3 (72.1)	22.9 (73.2)	23.1 (73.6)	22.6 (72.7)
Record low °C (°F)	20.0 (68.0)	19.5 (67.1)	20.5 (68.9)	19.5 (67.1)	17.1 (62.8)	16.5 (61.7)	16.7 (62.1)	16.5 (61.7)	16.5 (61.7)	17.8 (64.0)	18.1 (64.6)	20.4 (68.7)	16.5 (61.7)
Average precipitation mm (inches)	408.9 (16.10)	351.2 (13.83)	279.3 (11.00)	323.4 (12.73)	319.6 (12.58)	232.8 (9.17)	195.4 (7.69)	191.5 (7.54)	249.5 (9.82)	328.6 (12.94)	337.2 (13.28)	469.4 (18.48)	3,686.8 (145.15)
Average precipitation days (≥ 1.0 mm)	21.1	19.1	19.2	17.1	17.0	15.6	15.5	13.9	15.4	17.6	18.1	21.3	210.9
Source: Météo-France
