= Tamatoa V =

- King of Raiatea and Taha'a
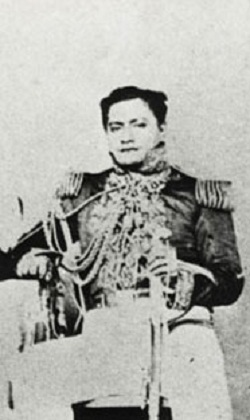
- King Tamatoa V of Raiatea
- Reign: 19 August 1857 – 8 February 1871
- Coronation: 1 December 1860
- Predecessor: Tamatoa IV
- Successor: Tahitoe
- Born: 23 September 1842; Moorea
- Died: 30 September 1881 (aged 39); Papeete
- Spouse: Moe Ma-hea-nu'u-a-Mai
- Issue: Princess Teri'i-'o-uru-maona Pomare; Teriivaetua; Teriimaevarua III; Prince Tamatoa-tane; Princess Teri’inavahoroa-vahine Tamatoa Pomare Matauira; Princess 'O 'Aimata Teri’i-vahine-i-titaua-'o-ote-ra’i
Names
- Tamatoa-a-tu Pōmare
- House: House of Pōmare
- Father: Ariʻifaʻaite
- Mother: Pōmare IV
- Religion: Protestantism

Tamatoa V, born Tamatoa-a-tu Pōmare, (23 September 1842, Moorea – 30 September 1881, Papeete), King of Raiatea and Taha'a, was a son of Queen Pōmare IV of Tahiti.

== Life ==
After the death of Tamatoa IV on 23 May 1857, his adopted son succeeded him under the name Tamatoa V and was crowned in Uturoa by missionary Charles Barff on 19 August 1857. However, some sources mention a second coronation ceremony held in Opoa on 1 December 1860 by Reverend George Platt, which may reflect complex political circumstances surrounding the official recognition of his reign. Deposed on February 8, 1871, after the murder of a collector of fines named Paino. He was exiled to the island of Maiʻao and Tahitoe was nominated to replace him. He married Moe Ma-hea-nu'u-a-Mai (Princess Moe-a-Mai) (elder daughter of Te-He-papai Ma-hea-nu'u-a-Mai, of Faʻaʻā, Judge of the High Court, Pastor and Member of the Supreme Council of Churches) and had one sons and five daughters:

- Princess Teri’i-'o-uru-maona Pomare (12 July 1867 – 15 December 1872), designated Crown Princess of Tahiti as Pōmare VI in eventual succession to her uncle Pōmare V.
- Princess Teri’i-vae-tua-vahine Pomare (22 September 1869 – 4 December 1918), designated Heiress Presumptive of the Crown of Tahiti on the death of her older sister (15 December 1872), later designated Heiress Apparent in succession to Pōmare V (24 September 1877), in preference to any children that Queen Marau might give birth. Married 29 April 1884 (divorced 21 January 1893) to Teri’itonorua Norman Brander.
- Princess Ari‘i-'otare Teri‘i-maevarua III (28 May 1871 – 19 November 1932), last Queen of Bora Bora. Married 9 January 1884 (divorced in 1887) to Prince Teri'i Hinoi-a-tua Pomare, chief of Hitia'a.
- Prince Tamatoa-tane (22 September 1872 – 25 August 1873).
- Princess Teri’inavahoroa-vahine Tamatoa Pomare Matauira (7 November 1877 – 3 December 1918), married firstly 27 August 1896 to 'Opuhara Salmon (d. 6 August 1908) and secondly 24 December 1910 to Teuraiterai Mote Salmon (d. 21 April 1926), her brother-in-law.
- Princess 'O 'Aimata Teri’i-vahine-i-titaua-'o-ote-ra’i (29 June 1879 – 3 April 1894).

He died at Papeete, 30 September 1881. He was succeeded by Tahitoe, a member of the cadet branch of the Tamatoa Royal Family.

When George Herbert, 13th Earl of Pembroke visited the islands with Dr. George Henry Kingsley in 1870, he was stricken by his wife's charm and beauty and referred to the king and queen as "Beauty and the Beast."

== Ancestry ==
Ancestors of Tamatoa V

4. Ariʻipeu-a-Hiro
2. Ariʻifaʻaite
10. Tamatoa IV (= 14)
5. Teihotu Taʻavea
11. Tu-ra’i-ariʻi E-he-vahine (= 15)
1. Tamatoa V
12. Pōmare I
6. Pōmare II
13. Tetua-nui-reia-i-te-raʻi-atea
3. Pōmare IV
14. Tamatoa IV (= 10)
7. Teri’to'-o-terai Tere-moe-moe
15. Tu-ra’i-ariʻi E-he-vahine (= 11)

== Bibliography ==
- Bertrand de La Roncière: La Reine Pomare : Tahiti et l'Occident, 1812-1877, L'Harmattan, 2003.
- Henry, Teuira; Orsmond, John Muggridge (1928). Ancient Tahiti. Vol. 48. Bernice Pauahi Bishop Museum.
- Anne-Lise Shigetomi-Pasturel: Raiatea 1818–1945: permanences et ruptures politiques, économiques et culturelles, Université de la Polynésie française, 3 vol., 517 p.
- Raoul Teissier: Chefs et notables au temps du protectorat: 1842 - 1880, Société des Études Océaniennes, 1996 (re-edition).

Regnal titles
Preceded by Tamatoa IV	King of Raiatea; 1857–1871	Succeeded by Tahitoe
