= Mahine Teheiura =

King of Huahine (1761–1838)

Mahine
- King of Huahine and Mai’ao
- Reign: 1810–1815
- Predecessor: Tenania
- Successor: Teriitaria II
- Born: c. 1761
- Died: 2 February 1838 (aged 76–77)
- Spouse: Vaea Pere-ra; Tetua-apua; Tao’a; Mahine-vahine
- Issue: Tu’aitara; Ta’aroa’ari’i
Names
- Mahine Tamatoa II (Tehei’ura Puru)
- Father: Mato Teri’i-te Po Are’i
- Mother: Te-tu-ave-roa

Mahine', also called Te-hei-’ura or Puru (c. 1761–1838) was king of Huahine, an island located among the Society Islands archipelago. He was born in 1761.

Mahine Tehei’ura became a king in 1810 after the abdication of Tenania, his brother. In 1815 he abdicated for his niece Teri'itaria of Raiatea.

== See also ==
- Kingdom of Huahine
- List of monarchs of Huahine

Mahine Teheiura Rulers of Huahine Born: 1761 Died: 2 February 1838
Preceded by Tenania	King of Huahine; 1810–1815	Succeeded by Teriitaria II
