= Teuira Henry =

Tahitian scholar, ethnologist, folklorist, linguist, historian and educator

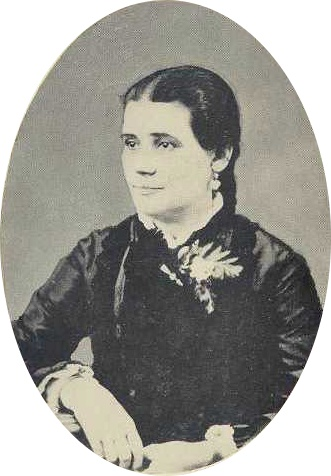
- Born: 24/27 January 1847; Tahiti, Kingdom of Tahiti
- Died: 23 January 1915 (aged 67); Paea, Papeete, Tahiti, French Polynesia
- Occupations: scholar, ethnologist, folklorist, linguist, historian and educator
- Known for: Writing about the culture and history of Tahiti

Teuira Henry (24/27 January 1847 – 23 January 1915) was a British Tahitian scholar, ethnologist, folklorist, linguist, historian and educator. She worked to reconstruct a lost manuscript on the history of Tahiti written by her grandfather, English missionary John Muggridge Orsmond, by using his original notes. Most of her writings were published posthumously by the Bernice Pauahi Bishop Museum as the book Ancient Tahiti.

== Early years and education ==
Henry was born on 24 January or 27 January 1847, on Tahiti, as the fourth child and eldest daughter of Isaac Shepherd Henry and Eliza Orsmond Henry. Her paternal grandparents were William Henry and Ann Shepherd Henry while her maternal grandparents were John Muggridge Orsmond and Isabella Nelson Orsmond. Her two grandfathers were early English Protestant missionaries to Tahiti. William Henry had been part of the first contingent of the London Missionary Society to arrive on the ship Duff in 1797.

Raised on Tahiti, she was educated at the missionary school run by William Howe and his wife in Papeete. She became fluent in French, English and Tahitian.

== Career ==
Becoming a school teacher, she taught French and English at the Viennot School in Papeete for twenty years. From 1890 to 1906, Henry also taught in the Royal School and Kaahumanu School in Honolulu, Hawaii.

Henry's maternal grandfather Orsmond had collected significant amounts of oral histories, genealogy, myths, folklore and traditional knowledge such as astronomy and navigation while living in Tahiti between 1817 and his death in 1856. In 1848, he had presented a manuscript about the history of Tahiti to French colonial official Charles François Lavaud, but it was lost before it could be published in Paris. During her lifetime, Henry reconstructed this lost manuscript by transcribing the original notes he left behind. Henry collected further similar material, translated and notated the material and wrote articles that were published by journals such as the Journal of the Polynesian Society.

Henry died on 23 January 1915, in Paea, Papeete, Tahiti, at the age of 67 years old.

Her manuscript was posthumously published as Ancient Tahiti by the Bernice Pauahi Bishop Museum in 1928. Bertrand Jaunez translated it into French in 1951 under the title Tahiti aux temps anciens. In 1995, Dennis Kawaharada re-printed some of Henry's stories alongside others in Voyaging chiefs of Havaiʻi.
