= Maiʻao =

Island in French Polynesia

Native name: Maiʻao
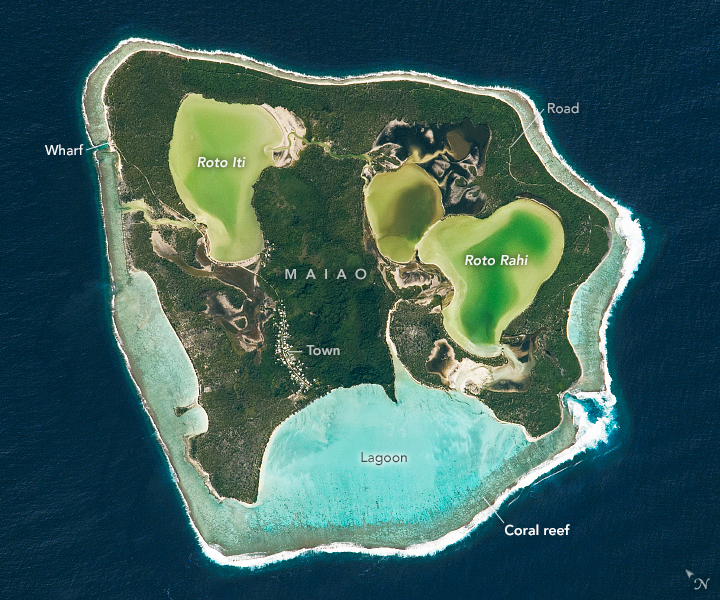
- NASA picture of Maiʻao

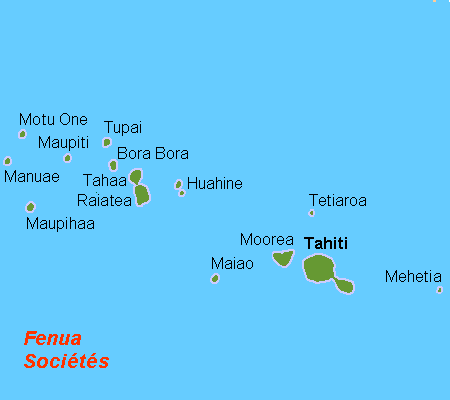

Geography
- Location: Pacific Ocean
- Coordinates: 17°39′S 150°38′W
- Archipelago: Society Islands
- Total islands: 2
- Major islands: Maiʻao
- Area: 8.8 km^{2} (3.4 sq mi)
- Highest elevation: 154 m (505 ft)

Administration
- France
- Overseas collectivity: French Polynesia

Demographics
- Population: 343 (2022)
- Pop. density: 41/km^{2} (106/sq mi)

Maiʻao, also rendered as Maiao in languages other than Tahitian, is an 8.8 km^{2} (3.4 sq mi) island formation located 78 km (48 mi) southwest of Moʻorea and one of the Windward Islands (French: Îles du Vent) in French Polynesia.

== Geography ==
The island formation consists of one high island with a peak elevation of 154 meters (505') and a low island (or motu) that winds along the base of the high island. The formation encloses two hypersaline lagoons called Roto Iti and Roto Rahi. The island also has a lagoon at its edge. All lagoons are connected through narrow channels. The island is home to 343 people (2022 census).

== Administration ==
The island is administratively part of the commune (municipality) of Moʻorea-Maiʻao, itself in the administrative subdivision of the Windward Islands.
