= U'uru =

- Ari'i rahi of Raiatea
- Reign: 1755–1765
- Predecessor: Tamatoa II
- Successor: Tamatoa III
- Born: c. 1735
- Died: c. 1806 (aged 71)
- Spouse: Puni; Rereao; Teroro
- Issue: Mateha, Hihipo; Tamatoa III; Tahitoe, Hihipo; Faita Pehupehu; Pahi
Names
- Veteara'i U'uru Teri'inavahoroa
- House: Tamatoa
- Father: Tamatoa II
- Mother: Maihe'a

U'uru (c. 1735 – c. 1806), also known by the names Veteara'i U'uru or Teri'inavahoroa, was a sovereign or ari'i rahi of the island of Ra'iātea. The European explorer James Cook first encountered him in 1773 during his second voyage to the Pacific. U'uru ruled over Raiatea, before the island was conquered around 1767 by Puni, a warrior from Bora Bora.

Although U'uru retained his title, his authority was confined to his ancestral district of Opoa at the southeastern point of Ra'iātea. In effect, he acted as a viceroy under Puni's suzerainty. Despite this dependency, he became the ancestor of many members of the royal lineages of the Leeward Islands. Through alliances and adoptions, his descendants eventually established themselves as rulers of these islands.

Cook's final encounter with U'uru took place in 1777 on the island of Huahine, where he was received with honors befitting a king. His son, Tamatoa III, was designated as the principal chief (ari'i rahi) of Ra'iātea by Puni before his death, with the approval of the chiefs Ma'i II and Tefa'aora I of Bora Bora. The latter, Ma'i II's nephew, was still a child and under regency. After the death of Puni, traditionally dated to 1786, succession passed to his daughter, Maevarua, who assumed authority over the islands of Bora Bora, Maupiti, and Tupai. Subsequently, leadership was transferred to Puni's great-granddaughter, Teri'imaevarua a Te'aue. Owing to her youth and the political circumstances of the period, her rule was exercised under the regency of Ma'i III and Tefa'aora I, a situation that endured until the end of 1804. During her reign, Puni's nephew, Tapoa I, successfully conquered Ra'iātea, and Taha'a in 1800, and later Bora Bora in December 1804.

In 1802, Tamatoa III resided in Ra'iātea, while the majority of his children lived in Huahine. Tapoa I had conquered Taha'a and resided in Ra'iātea, where he seemed to wield as much power as King Tamatoa himself. He had adopted Tetupai'a, later known as Teremo'emo'e or Teravahine, the second daughter of Tamatoa III, and renamed her Taitaru in memory of his own daughter, who had died young. This adoption further strengthened family ties with the Tamatoa and reinforced the military alliance between the islands of Huahine, Ra'iātea, and Taha'a.

During this period, the island of Bora Bora remained a well-guarded fortress under the rule of chiefs Ma'i III and Tefa'aora I. After an initial failed attempt to subdue Bora Bora in January 1804, Tapoa I finally conquered the island later that year in the battle of Huri'aua. His daughter, Maevarua, was subsequently recognized as a principal chief of Bora Bora and Taha'a until her death on July 14, 1809.

Tamatoa III and Tapoa I were the leading chiefs of the Leeward Islands when the English missionaries landed on Huahine in November 1808. The period between Cook's departure from the Leeward Islands in December 1777 and the year 1791 remains poorly documented, despite brief visits to Huahine by John Watts in 1788 and William Bligh in 1789. However, the writings and testimonies collected by navigators provide some insight into this tumultuous era, characterized by incessant struggles for territory among the islands of Bora Bora, Ra'iātea, Taha'a, and Huahine.

U'uru was last mentioned by the merchant and navigator John Turnbull in October 1802 in Raiatea. He likely died sometime after 1802 but before the arrival of the English missionaries in Huahine in November 1808, by which point he no longer appeared in written records.

== U'uru's family ==
U'uru was born to father Tamatoa II and mother Maihe'a, who was also known as Tetuanui. Cook refers to U'uru as the "Principal chief" or ari'i rahi by hereditary rights of the district of Opoa situated at the Southeastern point of Ra'iātea.

U'uru had five sons, including Tamatoa III, who would later succeed him.

Between the years 1821 and 1829, missionaries Daniel Tyerman and George Bennet were deputed from the London Missionary Society to visit their various stations in the South Sea Islands, China, and India. They reported that Tamatoa III was sixty five years old in 1822 and had three brothers named Tahitoe, Faita, and Pahi. Tahitoe was also known as Hiaiai or Hihipa, and died by March 1827 during an epidemic that struck the Society Islands. He left behind a son, also named Tahitoe who was twelve years old in 1822. Faita, also known as Pehupehu or Tepoanu'u, was a reputed former sorcerer. He was the last of the family and is said to have died in 1866, leaving descendants. Pahi also called Tiatia, served as a chief judge. His name was mentioned in the first code of law of Tamatoa in 1820. He died without issue. Tamatoa III, whose lineage is well known, died in June 1831. U'uru had a fifth son, Mateha. He married Maheanu'u, the daughter of the late chief Maheanu'u of Tahiti, on March 7, 1799. He died without issue on June 7, 1802, at Tautira, alongside Pomare II, during a night assault by the warriors of Atehuru.

== James Cook first voyage 1769 ==
During his first stay in Ra'iātea in 1769, Cook visited the Taputapuatea marae in the district of Opoa. He was accompanied by Joseph Banks, Daniel Solander and Tupai'a. They observed a model of a canoe about three feet long, adorned with eight human lower jawbones. Tupai'a, who often expressed great fear of the men of Bora Bora, explained that these warriors had conquered Raiatea and customarily cut off the jawbones of those killed in war. He further clarified that these displayed jawbones belonged to the people of Ra'iātea and were exhibited as war trophies by the Bora Bora warriors. Cook concluded that hostilities had taken place a few years before his arrival and that the people of Bora Bora now owned most of the lands on Ra'iātea. Puni, the ari'i rahi (principal chief) of Bora Bora and conqueror of Ra'iātea and Taha'a, was passing through these islands. After receiving supplies through Puni's men, Cook met him in person on August 6, 1769, according to the civil calendar. Puni accepted Cook's proposal to accompany him to Taha'a the next day to visit the island and gather provisions.

== James Cook second voyage 1773-1774 ==
During Cook's first two voyages, Huahine was ruled by an elderly chief named Ori, who served as regent for the young Teri'itaria I, who was around eight years old in 1773. The naturalist Johann Reinhold Forster and his son Georg Forster met the young ruler, referring to him as "T’aree-tarea." They noted that Chief Ori, although about fifty to sixty years old, was Teri'itaria I's uncle. His father had been killed in one of the battles against Puni.

On September 9, 1773, during his first stopover at Ra'iātea, Cook visited Chief Orio, whom he had first met in 1769. Two days later, on September 11, 1773, he received a visit from U'uru, the ari'i rahi (principal chief) of the district of Opoa. U'uru was said to be Orio's brother. On June 4, 1774, during Cook's second stopover in Ra'iātea, Orio and his entire family, came on board, to say their last farewell, accompanied by U'uru and Boba, the ari'i rahi of Taha'a, along with several friends.

At the conclusion of his second voyage to the Leeward Islands, James Cook shared observations about the political structure of Ra'iātea and Taha'a. Orio, a native of Bora Bora, held lands at Ra'iātea, likely obtained through conquest. He acted as Puni's lieutenant and appeared to exercise regal authority, functioning as the island's supreme magistrate despite not being its hereditary ruler. Cook noted that Orio showed respect to U'uru, the rightful ari'i rahi by birth. However, U'uru's influence was limited to his own district of Opoa and his titular role.

The government of Taha'a appeared similar to that of Ra'iātea. Two chiefs, Boba and Ota, held power, although Cook only met Boba. He was informed that Boba was expected to marry Puni's daughter Maevarua after Puni's death. This union would grant Boba the same regal authority Puni held. Maevarua was twelve years old in 1774. Other figures, including Ma'i and Tupai'a, lost their lands and retreated to Huahine and Tahiti, respectively, preferring voluntary exile over submission to the conqueror. The warriors who had accompanied Puni on these expeditions were generously rewarded with extensive possessions, and many of his subjects received grants in the conquered islands.

== James Cook third voyage 1777 ==
In 1777, Chief Ori was no longer serving as the regent of Teri'itaria I, the ari'i rahi of Huahine, and was now residing in Ra'iātea. U'uru had moved to the island of Huahine, where he resided as a king, according to Cook. He had strong ancestral ties to Mato, himself a descendant of the Tamatoa line, whose brother Rohianu'u was the father of Teri'itaria I and the first husband of Teha'apapa I.

During his long stay on Huahine in October 1777, Cook made efforts to gather detailed information about the conquest of the islands of Ra'iātea and Taha'a by Puni. He learned that, prior to his arrival, Ra'iātea maintained strong alliances with Taha'a and Huahine. However, its decline began when Taha'a withdrew from the league. The combined fleets of Ra'iātea and Huahine faced an assault from Bora Bora Initially victorious, their forces were eventually overwhelmed when Taha'a allied with Bora Bora, turning the tide in favor of the attackers. Following their victory, the men from Bora Bora invaded and briefly occupied Huahine, but the island's inhabitants secured reinforcements from Tahiti and regained control, maintaining their independence under their own chiefs. However, they failed to recover Ra'iātea. Discord soon erupted among the victors, as Taha'a's people demanded an equal share of the spoils. Bora Bora refused to yield, and with Ra'iātea already conquered, Taha'a also fell under the domination of its sovereign, Puni. During the conquest of the two islands, five battles were fought in various locations, resulting in heavy casualties on both sides. Since Teri'itari'a I's father was killed by Puni during one of these battles, and considering he was about twelve years old in 1777, it appears that the final phase of the conquest of Ra'iātea and Taha'a occurred around 1765.

Omai confirmed in 1773 that Huahine had briefly fallen under Puni's control, with numerous Bora Bora inhabitants occupying the island. However, through the intervention of Tereroa, Ori's brother, and the support of warriors from Taha'a, the island was successfully reclaimed. In the aftermath, Puni killed Tereroa and confronted Ori, who ultimately succeeded in driving him back.

== Tamatoa III Principal chief of Ra'iātea ==
Tamatoa III succeeded his father, U'uru, as ari'i rahi of the district Opoa upon reaching his majority in 1777, according to tradition. He was later appointed as principal chief of Ra'iātea by Puni and Ma'i II (born c. 1760), as well as his nephew, Tefa'aora I (born c.1780), who was still a child and under regency, according to testimonies from the descendants of the latter two. This appointment likely occurred before 1786, the year of Puni's death. While Tamatoa authority extended beyond the district of Opoa, he remained under the suzerainty of Puni.

== Conflict between Huahine and the combined forces of Ra'iātea and Bora-Bora, 1778 ==
On November 13, 1788, during his stop at Tahiti, Captain Bligh hosted guests aboard his ship. They informed him that Ma'i had died approximately thirty months after Captain Cook's departure from the Leeward Islands. Shortly after Cook left Huahine, conflicts erupted between its inhabitants and those of Raiatea, who were actually Bora Bora natives occupying lands on Ra'iātea, with additional warriors from Bora Bora joining the fight. Due to his possession of three or four muskets and some ammunition, Ma'i had gained prominence and was consulted on the matter. Confident in their chances, he assured the people of Huahine of victory, leading to an immediate declaration of war. The few firearms they had quickly secured them success, causing heavy casualties among the Bora Borans. Peace was soon restored. Additionally, Tyvarooah, the elder of the two New Zealand boys left in Omai's care, died shortly after him. No information was provided about Coah, the younger of the two.

On April 6, 1789, Captain Bligh made a brief stop at Huahine to verify information he had received in Tahiti regarding Ma'i. He deliberately avoided disembarking at Fare, choosing to stay far beyond the reef. A local resident and friend of Ma'i confirmed the details Bligh had previously heard. He was also informed that Coah had died, and that of all the animals left with Ma'i, only the mare had survived. After Ma'i's death, his house had been destroyed and its materials stolen. His firearms had ended up at Ra'iātea but were no longer functional. Additionally, all the plants and trees he had cultivated were destroyed, except for a single tree (the Pomelo destroyed by the French in 1846 during the bombardment of the village of Fare).

Captain Cook had left Bora Bora on December 8, 1777, after purchasing Bougainville's anchor from Puni. The conflict between Huahine and Ra'iātea likely occurred at the end of 1777 or early 1778.

== Death of Ma'i and raid on Huahine by the people of Ra'iātea, 1780 ==
According to information given by Captain Bligh, Ma'i died thirty month after Captain Cook's departure from the Leeward Islands, during the year 1780.

On July 10, 1788, the Lady Penrhyn, commanded by Captain William Cropton Sever and with Lieutenant John Watts acting as supercargo, anchored at Matavai Bay on the island of Tahiti. Watts, having previously visited Tahiti during James Cook's third voyage, brought valuable regional knowledge to the expedition. The ship, originally part of the First Fleet transporting convicts to New South Wales, had departed Sydney Cove on May 5, 1788, under contract to the East India Company. It was intended to sail to the Northwest Coast of America for fur trading, then proceed to China. However, due to crew illness and poor ship condition, the vessel diverted to Tahiti for repairs and recovery. During the ship's stay, Pōmare II mentioned the death of Ma'i and the two New Zealand boys, and added that there had been a skirmish between the men of Raiatea and those of Huahine, in which the former were victorious, and a large portion of Mai's property was taken to Ra'iātea.

After stopping at Tahiti, the Lady Penrhyn headed toward the island of Huahine. Captain Sever chose not to anchor or land. Instead, he lay to off the coast. On July 29, 1788, an elderly chief named Tutti came aboard the ship. John Watts who was an officer aboard HMS Resolution on Cook's third voyage immediately recognized Ori, with whom Cook had exchanged his name. He reported that following Ma'i's death, the men of Ra'iātea launched an attack on Huahine, claiming that, as Ma'i was originally from Ra'iātea, they had a rightful claim to his property. Ori explained that they took a significant portion of Ma'i's belongings, particularly his muskets, which they destroyed by breaking the stocks and burying the powder in the sand. He further described the conflict as fierce, with heavy loss on both sides, and noted that tensions remained high even afterward. As for his horses, the mare died shortly after giving birth, and the foal perished with her. The stallion remained alive, though he was of no use. The house Captain Cook had built for Ma'i was still standing, though it was now covered by a much larger structure built in the traditional style, which had been claimed by the island's chief.

== The battle of Ho'oroto 1780. Transition of power from Teri'itaria I to Mato's sons Mahine and Tenani'a ==
The earliest known account of the Battle of Ho'oroto was recorded by William Ellis around 1820. During the war between the people of Huahine and those of Ra'iātea, Mahine, the principal chief of Huahine, participated in the conflict, which took place on Ra'iātea. Mahine recounted that their war fleet consisted of ninety war canoes, each approximately one hundred feet long and filled with warriors. His father, Mato led their forces. In addition to their traditional weapons, they possessed two guns left by Captain JamesCook with Ma'i, which they believed would secure them an easy victory. This battle was one of the bloodiest in recent memory. Tenani'a, the king of Huahine, waged war to avenge Ohureha'apa, a man who had been exiled by the Ra'iātean chiefs. His son remained in Ra'iātea, which motivated the leaders and people of Huahine to seek his father's reinstatement. The Huahinean fleet anchored at the islet of Tipaemau, causing the Ra'iāteans to retreat to Taha'a. The Huahinean chief demanded that Tapoa (sic) surrender the land, but his request was denied, leading both sides to prepare for battle. The following day, the opposing fleets clashed near Ho'oroto in an exceptionally fierce and deadly fight. Casualties were so numerous that, when the bodies were gathered the next day, they reportedly formed a pile as tall as young coconut trees. Determined to fight until one side was annihilated, the warriors were only halted when Mau'ai, a native of Bora Bora, claimed that the god ʻOro had decreed they should stop. As a result, a ceasefire was agreed upon. Despite the truce, warriors from the Huahinean districts of Faretou and Fareihi, having suffered fewer losses, set sail for Taha'a with the intent to plunder the island. However, they encountered far stronger resistance than expected and were nearly wiped out. Mato, the father of Mahine and the army's general, was killed. The surviving Huahinean warriors retreated to Huahine, and the Ra'iāteans, too weakened to pursue them, allowed their departure. This war resulted in the decimation of many chiefs and warriors across the Leeward Islands. Huahine, in particular, never fully recovered from the devastation of this brutal conflict.

It seems that Ellis confused Tapoa I with Puni, the chief who had conquered Ra'iātea and controlled the Taputapuatea marae. The identity of the figure named Ohureha'apa also raises questions. Later accounts suggest he may have been the uncle of King Tapoa I and a member of the royal Marotetini lineage of Bora Bora, but this remains uncertain.

An alternative version of the battle of Ho'oroto is found in a Tahitian text from 1846, whose author from Huahine remains unknown. According to this account, Mo'ohono sought to enhance the prestige of his grandchildren. He asked Teha'apapa I to grant him the small island of Mai'ao, but when she refused, he declared war. Teha'apapa was defeated and forced to surrender both Mai'ao along with governance of Huahine. Mo'ohono aimed to extend his grandchildren's influence over Huahine, which he had conquered, and planned to have them enthroned at the Taputapuatea marae, then controlled by Bora Bora's people. He spent ten years preparing for this conflict. Interestingly, his grandsons did not take part in the battle ensuring that if the warriors were wiped out, they could later avenge them. The battle of Ho'oroto, occurred six seasons after Cook's arrival in Huahine, near the Tipaemanu islet in Raiatea. Mo'ohono, Mato, and many chiefs were killed. Upon hearing of Mo'ohono's defeat and Tenania's overthrow in Huahine, the people of Huahine were shocked. This led to five internal wars between Teri'itaria I, supported by the eight traditional chiefdoms of Huahine federated around Maeva, and Tenania and Mahine, backed by Te fare ari'i, (now known as Tefareri'i, the Royal House of Tamatoa) which included the newer chiefdoms of Ama and Atea. These five internal wars, Fa'afara, Hopupu, Teruapo, Ruahine, and Tuapa, all ended in victory for Tenani'a.

This version presents Mahine and his brother Tenani'a as absent from the war, introducing another character, Mo'ohono. The two muskets that belonged to Omai are also missing from this account. The author provides a vague timeframe, stating that the battle occurred six seasons after Cook's arrival in Huahine. Missionary John Barff, clarified this ambiguity, noting that the battle occurred soon after Cook's last voyage. According to the traditional Tahitian calendar described by King Pōmare II in 1826, the year was divided into two main seasons based on the position of the Pleiades in the sky: Matari'i i ni'a ("Pleiades above"), marking a time of abundance and rain, and Matari'i i raro ("Pleiades below"), signaling a time of scarcity and dryness. Six seasons equal three years. Therefore, the battle likely took place around 1780, before Omai's death as the musquets were reportedly used during the quarrel according to William Ellis.

The account of the Battle of Ho'oroto by Joseph Chesneau and Pascal Marcantoni in 1928 contrasts with Ellis's version but aligns with the "1846" narrative. According to their account, Mo'ohono petitioned Teha'apapa I for the kingship of Mai'ao iti for his grandsons, Tenani'a and Mahine. When she refused, he declared war, successfully overthrowing her, and installing his grandsons as rulers. To legitimize their reign, he sought to have them consecrated as ari'i rahi (principal chiefs) at the Taputapuatea marae, which was under the control of Bora Bora warriors led by Puni. Mo'ohono made extensive preparations for battle but was ultimately defeated at Ho'oroto in Ra'iātea around 1775 (sic). He, along with Mato and most of his warriors, were killed. Upon learning of his fate, Teha'apapa I made several attempts to reclaim Huahine's throne from Tenani'a and Mahine, who remained on the island. After five unsuccessful efforts, she was forced to surrender. Soon after, Tenania married Itia and relocated to Tahiti, leaving Mahine to govern Huahine and Mai'ao.

The war appears to have been fueled by Mo'ohono, Mato's father-in-law, and his ambition to officially enthrone his grandsons, Mahine and Tenani'a, by his daughter Tetuaveroa, at the Taputapuatea marae, which was under the control of the Bora Bora people known as the Fa'anui. He aimed to have them don the sacred red feather belt known as the maro 'ura. This belt was held at the time by U'uru, Mato's first cousin. Mato could also have claimed it based on the primogeniture rights of his grandfather, Ari'ima'o, which took precedence over those of Veteara'i U'uru. Following the deaths of Mo'ohono and Mato in 1780, it became evident that Mahine and Tenani'a succeeded in removing Teha'apapa I and her son, Teri'itaria I, ultimately seizing control of the islands of Huahine and Mai'ao by the end of 1790.

== Death of Puni and his succession, 1786 ==
Joseph Banks described Puni as an "old, decrepit, half-blind man" in 1769. Historians have estimated that he died in 1786. The anthropologist Kenneth Emory suggested that he was born around 1700 and identified him as Teihotumataroa. Puni died during the time of Chief Ma'i II who was born around 1760. His son Ma'i III was born about 1780 (Daniel Tyerman and George Bennet estimated his age as 35 in 1821) and died in 1864, while his daughter Ahu'ura was born in 1804. Ma'i III and Tefa'aora I were both grandchildren of Ma'i I. In his letter dated 28 February 1827, missionary George Platt reported that Tefa'aora I died during the latter half of 1826, as a result of an epidemic that had affected the Leeward Islands.

Captain James Cook reported in 1777 that Ra'iātea, though reduced to a humiliating state, was once the most prominent of the Leeward Islands and likely served as the first seat of government. The royal family of Tahiti (Pōmare) is said to be descended from the dynasty that ruled Ra'iātea before it was conquered by Puni.

Captain George Vancouver reported in January 1792 that Puni had previously conquered and annexed the islands of Raiatea and Taha'a under the government of Bora Bora. After Puni's death, the sovereignty of these islands naturally or originally passed by right of succession to a chief named Mauri, also known as Tutaha or Ha'amanimani, who was the brother of Tetupai'a, mother of Pomare I. In 1797, Captain James Wilson described Ha'amanimani as a former ruler of Raiatea. However, his claim to power appeared questionable, as he had been ousted either by his own subjects or by the inhabitants of Bora Bora. Ha'amanimani had chosen his grand-nephew, Pōmare II, as his successor. Meanwhile, other sources state that Puni had appointed Tamatoa III as his legal representative on Raʻiātea and Taha'a with the consent of chiefs Ma'i II (b. c.1760) and Tefa'aora I's (b. c.1780) regent.

Tutaha (Ha'amanimani) left Ra'iātea in November 1788 to settle permanently in Tahiti, and served as a high priest of ʻOro. He later became the prime minister of Pōmare I. In 1797, he sought assistance from Captain James Wilson to reclaim power over Ra'iātea, but his efforts were unsuccessful. Tutaha was ultimately assassinated on December 3, 1798, at Pare due to his involvement in a dispute between Pōmare I and his son Pōmare II.

According to the testimony of Chief Tefa'aora III (b. ca. 1828), recorded on 4 October 1845, Puni was succeeded by his daughter, Maevarua. She was reportedly twelve years old in 1774, when Johann Reinhold Forster and his son Georg Forster heard of her during James Cook's second voyage to the Leeward Islands. Maevarua was later succeeded by Teri'imaevarua a Te'aue (b. ca. 1800), Puni's great-granddaughter, who became the consort of Tefa'aora II (c. 1800-1843) and mother of Tefa'aora III.

According to tradition, Puni is believed to be a descendant of Teri'itaumihau a Puarai and Hoataatama. Hiro, said to have lived around 1200–1250, was the great-grandfather of Hoataatama. His genealogy traces back to the mythical origins of the world, to the supreme god Ta'aroanuitahitumu, the creator of all things.

In his journal, James Cook recorded the deity as Tarroutahitoomoo (Ta'aroatahitumu). According to the account he received, "Ta'aroa" or "Tetumu" existed before everything, except for a primordial rock called "Tepapa" which he embraced and begat Aoni, described as a "vegetable mold". Ta'aroa then shaped the earth, the sea, fresh water, the sun, the moon, and the stars, before finally creating the gods, divine beings positioned between himself and humanity. These gods later gave rise to humankind, ascended to the heavens, and left the world to their descendants.

== James Morrison. Ma'i's muskets. 1791 ==
In January 1791, while in Tahiti, Bounty mutineer James Morrison received reports from the inhabitants of Huahine concerning Ma'i. They informed him that Ma'i's muskets were in the possession of a chief who was a friend of his, "Tennanea", said to be the brother of "Tayreetarieea", king of "Hooaheine". The King "Tayreetarieea" mentioned by Morrison may have been Teri'itaria I, the ari'i rahi (principal chief) encountered by James Cook. However, according to the genealogist Mare, Teri'itaria I was not Tenani'a's brother but rather his cousin. Tenani'a, on the other hand, was indeed the elder brother of Mahine. "Teri'itaria" was a chiefly title borne by multiple sovereigns of Huahine. The prevailing consensus is that Mahine, who bore the title Teri'itaria, assumed rulership of Huahine toward the end of 1790. In some accounts, Tenani'a and Mahine were regarded as co-kings of Huahine, jointly ruling the island after the removal of Teha'apapa I and her son Teri'itaria I.

== Tatahoo King of Bora Bora, 1791 ==
Following Puni's death, which likely occurred between Cook's voyages and those of later explorers, his daughter "Maiwherua" (Maevarua) assumed power over the islands of Bora Bora, Maupiti, and Tupai. In 1774, at approximately twelve years old, she was betrothed to a chief named Boba, who governed Taha'a under Puni's rule and had been designated as his successor. On November 11, 1791, when Captain Edwards arrived at Bora Bora searching for the mutineers, authority had passed to a man named Tatahoo. The difference in names does not necessarily indicate separate individuals, as chiefs rarely retained the same title throughout their lives.

== O'Connor's account of the 1797 Huahine-Ra'iātea Conflict ==
In August 1797, Captain James Wilson, commander of the Duff, recorded the testimony of an Irish resident named Connor (James O'Connor) during a stop on the island of Huahine. He was a former castaway from the whaling ship Matilda, which was commanded by Captain Matthew Weatherhead and had been shipwrecked on the island of Moruroa on February 25, 1792. He recounted that about three months before Wilson's arrival, Huahine forces had launched an attack on Ra'iātea, which was then occupied by warriors from Bora Bora. Despite suffering heavy casualties on both sides, Huahine initially emerged victorious, forcing the Bora Bora warriors to retreat. However, when some Huahine warriors returned home to see their families, the Bora Bora forces regrouped, launched a counterattack with superior numbers, and killed around fifty of Huahine's best warriors. Connor himself narrowly escaped by canoe and displayed a scar from a wound sustained during the battle. Wilson observed that the cycle of warfare appeared unending, as each defeat was perceived as justification for renewed conflict. Preparations for another assault were already underway.

== Encounter with Turnbull, 1802 ==
Around the end of October 1802, Captain John Buyers and John Turnbull, British merchants and navigators landed at Ra'iātea. They met the "king" "Tomaquoa", and his "Queen" "Teerimonie" (Turaiari'i Ehevahine). The father of the king (U'uru) made them a visit. They moreover received a visit from the mother of the queen. Turnbull noted that the chief or king of Taha'a, who generally resided at Ra'iātea, was the commander-in-chief of the inhabitants of both islands in time of war, and seemed to possess much more power and influence at Ra'iātea than the king himself.

== The battle of Huri'aua. Bora Bora 1804. Tapoa I the new conquerant of the Leeward Islands ==
According to testimony gathered in 1823 by Jules Dumont d'Urville from Tamati, a seventy-year-old elder of Bora Bora, Tapoa I had established his dominance over Huahine, Raiatea, and Taha'a but failed in his first attempt to conquer Bora Bora, an event purported to have occurred twenty years earlier, in 1803. His assault on the well-defended fortifications of Bora Bora was unsuccessful and he lost an Englishman who served as his auxiliary during the campaign. Enraged by this failure, Tapoa I destroyed the houses in Fa'anui Bay, provoking the fury of the Fa'anui warriors, who emerged from their fortress to engage in battle on the plain of Tahu rua. Despite having a numerically superior army, Tapoa I was compelled to retreat to Ra'iātea, leaving chiefs Ma'i III and Tefa'aora I (c. 1780-1826) in control of Bora Bora.

In his journal at the end of May 1803, missionary John Davies reported that war was said to be ongoing on the island of Ra'iātea between a chief named Tapoa I and several other local leaders. Over a year later, in correspondence dated December 13, 1804, he described a recent and significant battle on the island of Bora Bora, again involving Tapoa I and rival chiefs. During this engagement, two individuals were killed: Connor, an Irishman, and a Hawaiian Islander whose name was not recorded. Tapoa I, later known as "the Conqueror," subsequently became the preeminent chief of the Leeward Islands.

Another account reported that, at the beginning of the 19th century, Tamatoa's warriors defeated those of Fa'anui in a battle known as "Huri'aua," fought at Bora Bora. This conflict aimed to install Tapoa I, the successor of Puni, in a position of power.

These events unfolded during the reign of the young Queen Teri'imaevarua a Te'aue (born c. 1800) the legitimate heir and spouse of Tefa'aora II. She had succeeded Queen Teri'imaevarua (born c. 1762), who was the daughter of Puni.

Following the victory of Tapoa I, Queen Teri'imaevarua a Te'aue was deposed and replaced by Tapoa I's daughter, Maevarua (not to be confused with Maevarua, daughter of Puni). During her reign, Ma'i III and Tefa'aora I were appointed as executive chiefs of Bora Bora. According to missionary John Davies, writing on 14 July 1809, three canoes arrived in Huahine from Ra'iātea to retrieve the chiefs who were to travel there to mourn the death of Maevarua, Tapoa I's daughter and the acknowledged sovereign of both Taha'a and Bora Bora.

== Arrival of English missionaries at Huahine, 1808 ==
On 11 November 1808, English missionaries arrived on the island of Huahine, seeking refuge from an insurrection against Pōmare II at Tahiti. Among them was missionary John Davies who recorded his stay in his diary. Upon their arrival, they were welcomed by Puru and his brother Ari'ipaea, whose wife Iti'a had previously been married to King Pōmare I of Tahiti.

On November 14, 1808, John Davies reported that Teriitaria II, the daughter of Tamatoa III, the principal chief of Ra'iātea, was recognized as the ari'i rahi (principal chief) of Huahine. She was also destined to marry King Pōmare II, strengthening political ties between the islands.

Later, on November 28, 1808, Davies mentioned the names of eight prominent chiefs of Huahine, most of whom were still young, with the exception of Teha'apapa I. The chiefs included Teha'apapa I the mother-in-law of Tamatoa III; Nohora'i, the son of Tamatoa III; Tenani'a, daughter of Tamatoa III; Turaiari'i, later called Tera'imano, daughter of Tenani'a from his first wife; Temari'i, better known as Ma'ihara, daughter of Tamatoa III; Teihotu daughter of Tamatoa III; Ta'aroaari'i, son of Mahine; and Teari'ia'etua, also called Tera'imano, daughter of Tenani'a by his second wife, Iti'a. Tamatoa III lived in Ra'iātea with another daughter named Tetupai'a, later known as Teremo'emo'e or Teravahine. She became the mother of Pōmare II's children, while her sister, Teri'itaria II, bore the title "Pōmare Vahine" or "Ari'ipaea Vahine." According to certain historical sources Tetupai'a was adopted by Chief Tapoa I.

The absence of U'uru from the writings of missionary John Davies suggests that he likely died sometime between 1802, when voyager John Turnbull last recorded his presence in Ra'iātea alongside his son, Tamatoa III, and 1808, when the missionaries arrived in Huahine. His disappearance from historical records during this period marks the beginning of a new era in Tahitian history.

== Family tree ==
Raiatea family tree

Tamatoa I (or II)
Bora Bora family
Ari'ima'o	Rofa'i
Puni; Ariʻi Rahi of Bora Bora, Raiatea and Taha'a	Pōmare Dynasty of Tahiti	Mau'a	Tamatoa II (or III)
Teu; Ariʻi of Pare-Arue; Ariʻi of the Porionuʻu	Tetupaia i Hauiri	Mato	Vete'ara'i 'U'uru; Ariʻi rahi of Opoa
Pōmare I King of Tahiti	Tura'iari'i Ehevahine	Tamatoa III (or IV); Ari'i Rahi of Raiatea	Tahitoe Hihipo
Tapoa I Ariʻi Rahi of Bora Bora, Raiatea and Taha'a	Pōmare II; King of Tahiti	Teriʻitoʻoterai; Teremoemoe	Teriitaria II; Queen of Huahine	Teihotu Ta'avea	Moeore, Tamatoa IV; King of Raiatea	Tahitoe; King of Raiatea
Tapoa II; King of Bora Bora and Taha'a	Pōmare IV; Queen of Tahiti	Ari'ifa'aite	Ariimate Teururai; King of Huahine	Tehaapapa II; Queen of Huahine	Tehauroa; Queen of Raiatea	Tuarii; Queen of Raiatea
Pōmare V King of Tahiti	Teri'imaevarua II; Queen of Bora Bora	Tamatoa V King of Raiatea	Moe a Ma'i	Tamatoa VI; King of Raiatea
Princess Teriiourumaona _{Tahitian Heir as Pōmare VI}	Princess Teriivaetua	Teri'imaevarua III; Queen of Bora Bora	Princess Teriinavahoroa	Princess 'Aimata	Prince Tamatoa

Notes:

The numbering of the Tamatoa varies. An ancestor of the Tamatoa line named Fa'aniti is often counted as "Tamatoa I" and Moeore is sometime not considered Tamatoa IV.

References

- Cadousteau, Mai-Arii (1987). "CHAPITRE VIII: AHU'URA FILLE DU ROI MAI III". Bulletin de la Société des Études Océaniennes. 20 (239–240). Papeete: Société des Études Océaniennes: 45–50. OCLC 9510786.
- Henry, Teuira; Orsmond, John Muggridge (1928). Ancient Tahiti. Vol. 48. Honolulu: Bernice Pauahi Bishop Museum. pp. 247–272. OCLC 3049679.
- Newbury, Colin W.; Darling, Adam J. (December 1967). "Te Hau Pahu Rahi: Pomare II and the Concept of Interisland Government in Eastern Polynesia". The Journal of the Polynesian Society. 76 (4). Wellington: The Polynesian Society: 477–514. JSTOR 20704508. OCLC 6015244633.
- Orsmond, John Muggridge; Smith, S. Percy (March 1893). "The Genealogy of the Pomare Family of Tahiti, from the Papers of the Rev. J. M. Orsmond. With Notes Thereon by S. Percy Smith". The Journal of the Polynesian Society. 2 (1). Wellington: The Polynesian Society: 25–43. JSTOR 20701269. OCLC 5544732839.
- Teissier, Raoul (1978). "Chefs et notables des Établissements Français de l'Océanie au temps du protectorat: 1842–1850". Bulletin de la Société des Études Océaniennes, Issue 202. Papeete: Société des Études Océaniennes. OCLC 9510786.

Huahine family tree

Tamatoa I (or II)
Rofa'i	Ari'ima'o
Tamatoa Dynasty of Raiatea	Mau'a
Rohianu'u	Tehaapapa I Queen of Huahine and Mai'ao	Mato	Tetuaveroa
Teriitaria I King of Huahine and Mai'ao	Tenani'a; King of Huahine and Mai'ao
Pōmare Dynasty of Tahiti	Tamatoa III, King of Raiatea and Taha'a	Tura'iari'i Ehevahine	Mahine Tehei'ura; King of Huahine and Mai'ao	Tao'a
Pōmare II; King of Tahiti	Teriʻitoʻoterai; Teremoemoe	Teriitaria II; Queen of Huahine and Mai'ao	Moeore, Tamatoa IV; King of Raiatea and Taha'a	Ta'aroari'i	Tematafainuu
Pōmare IV; Queen of Tahiti	Pōmare III; King of Tahiti	Tehaapapa II; Queen of Huahine and Mai'ao	Ariimate Teururai; King of Huahine and Mai'ao	Ma'ihara Temari'i
Tamatoa V King of Raiatea	Pōmare V King of Tahiti	Teuhe; Queen of Huahine	Tetuamarama	Marama Teururai; Prince-Regent of Huahine	Tamatoa VI; King of Raiatea and Taha'a
Teriitevaearai a Mai from the Mai family of Bora Bora	Tehaapapa III; Queen of Huahine

Notes:

Descending dotted lines denote adoptions.

References

- Henry, Teuira; Orsmond, John Muggridge (1928). Ancient Tahiti. Vol. 48. Honolulu: Bernice Pauahi Bishop Museum. pp. 247–272. OCLC 3049679.
- Newbury, Colin W.; Darling, Adam J. (December 1967). "Te Hau Pahu Rahi: Pomare II and the Concept of Interisland Government in Eastern Polynesia". The Journal of the Polynesian Society. 76 (4). Wellington: The Polynesian Society: 477–514. JSTOR 20704508. OCLC 6015244633.
- Teissier, Raoul (1978). "Chefs et notables des Établissements Français de l'Océanie au temps du protectorat: 1842–1850". Bulletin de la Société des Études Océaniennes, Issue 202. Papeete: Société des Études Océaniennes. OCLC 9510786.

Pōmare family tree

Ta'aroa Manahune	Tetuaehuri i Taiarapu
Teu; Ariʻi of Pare-Arue; Ariʻi of the Porionuʻu	Tetupaia i Hauiri of the Tamatoa; Dynasty of Raiatea
Teihotu i Ahurai; Ari'i of Moʻorea, Brother of Purea
Terereatua (Auo)	Metua'aro (Mahau); Ariʻi of Mo'orea and Vaiari	Itia	Pōmare I King of Tahiti and Moʻorea	Paiti; Ariʻi of Hapaiano
Tetuanui Tarovahine; Wife of Pōmare II	Teri'itaria Ari'ipaea; Queen of Huahine and Maʻiao	Pōmare II; King of Tahiti and Moʻorea	Teri'ito'oterai Teremoemoe	Teri'inavahoroa Vahine	Teri'inavahoroa Tane, Vehiatua; Ariʻi of Taiarapu	Terano Vahine
Pōmare III; King of Tahiti and Moʻorea	Teinaiti	Ari'ifa'aite	Pōmare IV; Queen of Tahiti and Moʻorea	Tapoa II; King of Bora Bora of the Tapoa; Dynasty of Bora Bora
Teuhe; Queen of Huahine of the Teurura'i; Dynasty of Huahine	Pōmare V King of Tahiti and Moʻorea	Marau	Ari'iaue	Teri'itua Tuavira "Prince Joinville"; Ariʻi of Hitiaʻa	Isabelle Vahinetua Shaw	Tamatoa V King of Raiatea and Tahaʻa	Moe a Mai	Teri'imaevarua II; Queen of Bora Bora	Temauiari'i a Mai	Teri'itapunui Punuari'i; Ariʻi of Mahina	Teri'inavahoroa a Mai
Teriʻihinoiatua Pōmare; Ariʻi of Hitiaʻa	Teri'imaevarua III; Queen of Bora Bora

Notes:

Descending dotted lines denote adoptions.

References

- Henry, Teuira; Orsmond, John Muggridge (1928). Ancient Tahiti. Vol. 48. Honolulu: Bernice Pauahi Bishop Museum. pp. 247–272. OCLC 3049679.
- Newbury, Colin W.; Darling, Adam J. (December 1967). "Te Hau Pahu Rahi: Pomare II and the Concept of Interisland Government in Eastern Polynesia". The Journal of the Polynesian Society. 76 (4). Wellington: The Polynesian Society: 477–514. JSTOR 20704508. OCLC 6015244633.
- Orsmond, John Muggridge; Smith, S. Percy (March 1893). "The Genealogy of the Pomare Family of Tahiti, from the Papers of the Rev. J. M. Orsmond. With Notes Thereon by S. Percy Smith". The Journal of the Polynesian Society. 2 (1). Wellington: The Polynesian Society: 25–43. JSTOR 20701269. OCLC 5544732839.
- Pomare, Tamatoa Brander; Pomare, Pomateao Salmon (15 August 1938). "The Pomares of Tahiti – Letter to the Editor". Pacific Islands Monthly. Vol. IX, no. 1. Sydney: Pacific Publications. p. 34. OCLC 780465500.
- Teissier, Raoul (1978). "Chefs et notables des Établissements Français de l'Océanie au temps du protectorat: 1842–1850". Bulletin de la Société des Études Océaniennes, Issue 202. Papeete: Société des Études Océaniennes. OCLC 9510786.

== See also ==
- List of monarchs of Huahine
- List of monarchs of Raiatea
- List of monarchs of Bora Bora
- List of consorts of Tahiti

== Notes ==
U'uru Rulers of Raiatea Born: 1735 Died: 1803
Preceded by Tamatoa II	Ari'i rahi of Raiatea; 1755–1765	Succeeded by Himself
Preceded by Himself	Ari'i rahi of Opoa; 1765–1777	Succeeded by Tamatoa III
