= Sarah Munro (disambiguation) =

Sarah Munro (born 1996) is a British singer-songwriter.

Sarah Munro may also refer to:

- Sarah Munro (artist) (born 1970), New Zealand artist
- Sarah Munro (judge), British crown court judge

== See also ==
- Sarah Munroe Three-Decker, historic triple decker house in Worcester, Massachusetts
