= A Māori and Pākehā man trading a crayfish =

Watercolour and pencil drawing

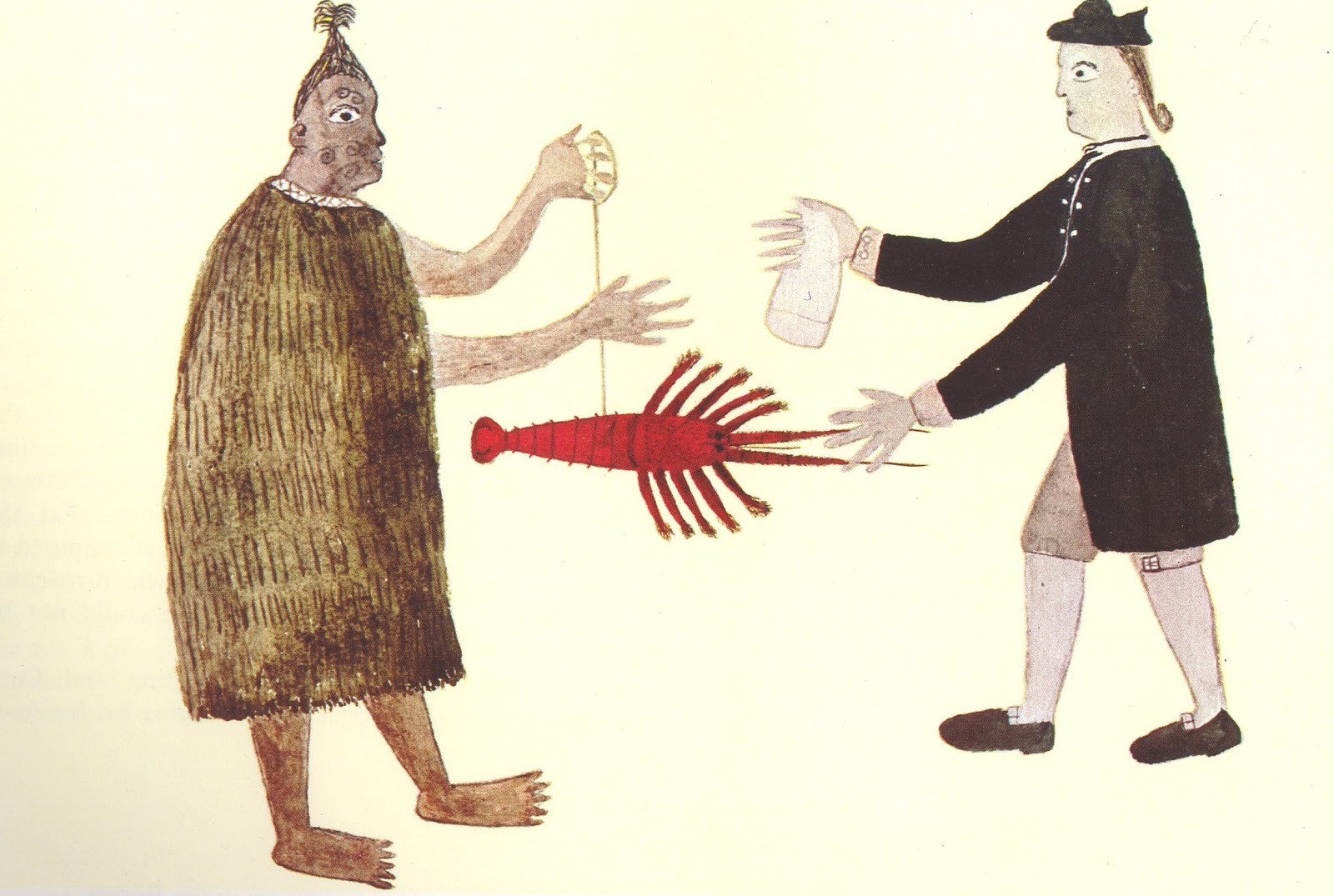
A Māori and Pākehā man trading a crayfish, drawing by Tupaia, c. 1769

A Māori and Pākehā man trading a crayfish is a c. 1769 watercolour and pencil drawing by Tupaia. The drawing depicts an unknown Māori man and Joseph Banks trading a crayfish for a piece of cloth. The drawing is in the collection of the British Library.

The drawing is referenced by Michel Tuffery in his work Tupaia's chart Cook and Banks/Tupaia's and Parkinson's paintbox. The artist Sarah Munro created a series Trade Items which uses embroidery to reference Tupaia's drawing. The drawing has also inspired and been referenced by artists, including Jo Torr and Marian Maguire, as well as Ayesha Green in her 2017 work, For Hine.
