= Arioi =

Tahitian religious order

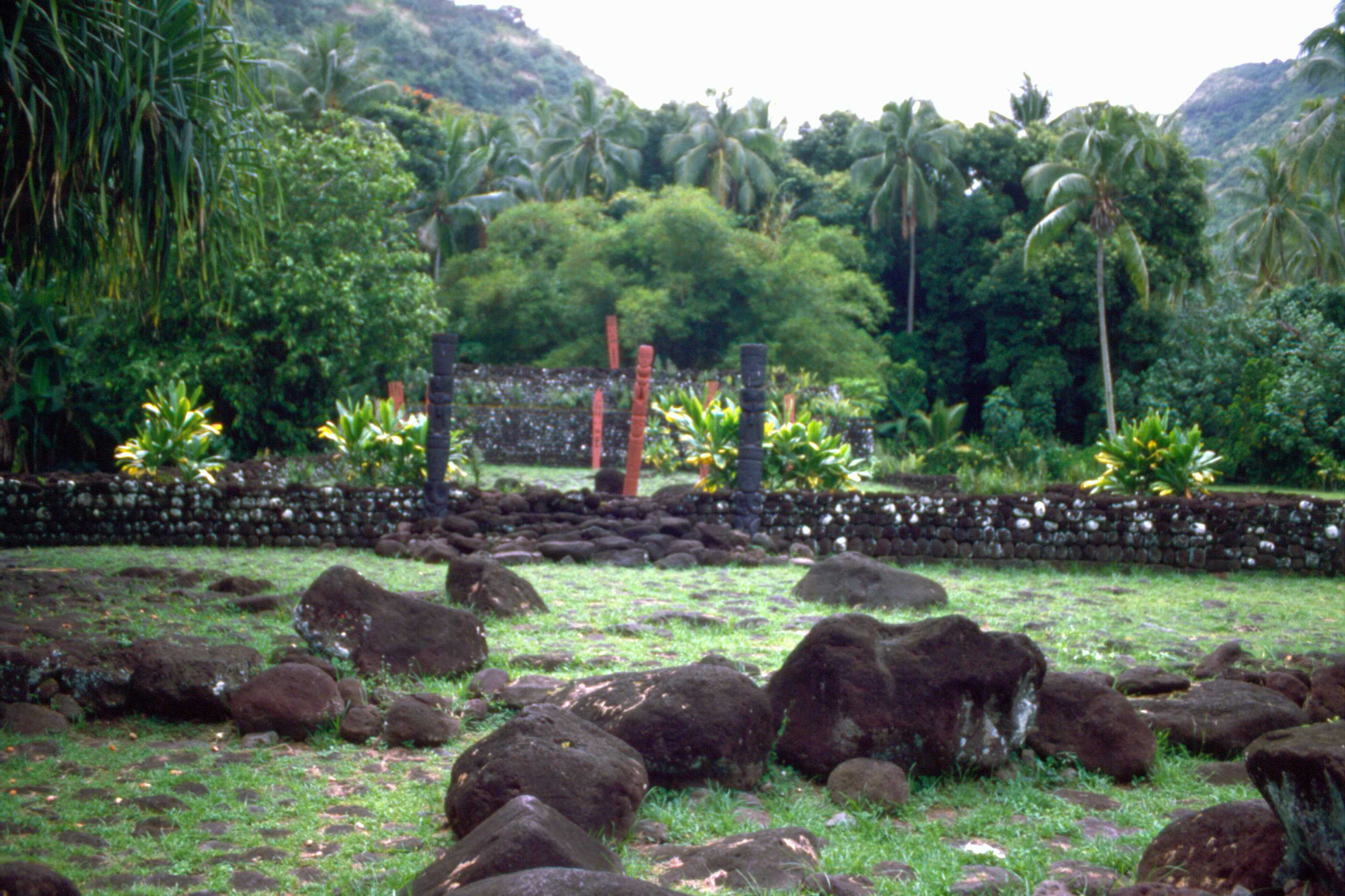
Tahiti: worship platforms (marae) in the Arahurahu Valley

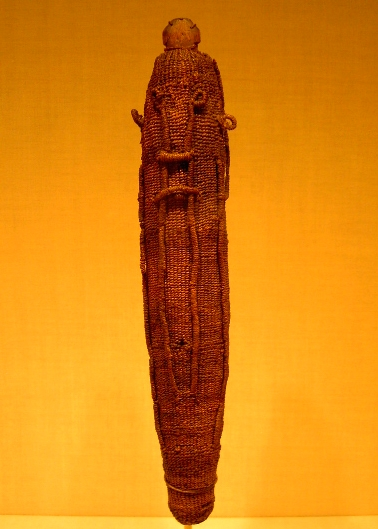
Idol (To´o) of the god Oro

The Arioi or Areoi were a secret religious order of the Society Islands, particularly the island of Tahiti, with a hierarchical structure, esoteric salvation doctrine and cultish and cultural functions. The order included both men and women of all social strata, though men predominated. The Arioi principally venerated the war god 'Oro, whom they considered the founder of their order.

== Polynesian society ==
In order to understand the comparable societies on other islands of the Polynesian Triangle, it is necessary to understand Polynesian societal order in classical times, i.e. before Europeans made contact with islands. In most of Polynesia, society was divided and structured according to a strict hierarchy comprising several social strata. This division did not always manifest itself the same way, but it can be found in Tahiti, Samoa, Hawaii, the Marquesas Islands, Austral Islands, Cook Islands, and even in the remotest corner of the Polynesian Triangle on Easter Island.

There were in essence three castes on the Society Islands:

- the nobility (Polynesian: ari´i or ariki) at the head of the society. They were the big land owners. Directly above them are the ariki rahi (English: the big Ariki), the sovereigns, who were recruited from the old noble families. On Tahiti, there were eight of them who headed one tribe each. Heredity of the title was not determined as much by sex as by primogeniture.
- the free (Polynesian: raatira), which small land owners, craftsmen, boatbuilders, tattoo artists and other artists essentially were. In war, they were next-in-command to the ariki. The divisions between the raatira and the lowest rungs of the lower nobility were fluid.
- the serfs (Polynesian: manahune), who were dependent on landowners to work the fields. They had to give up a large part of what they produced.

The system of power on the Society Islands included characteristics of medieval European feudalism.

== Structure ==
The structure of the order of the Arioi was a mirror image of Tahiti's hierarchical society. There were several ranks; Moerenhout describes eight ranks which could be reached through initiation. Admission into the orders was relatively simple at first; thus, admission was associated with increasingly difficult requirements. Theoretically, all levels of all social groups were open to everyone, but in practice the highest classes of the Arioi were reserved for the highest classes of the nobility. The upper classes were occupied by priests, mostly the sons and daughters of the noble families in the upper classes, which guaranteed that the Arioi built up strong support for the absolutist ruling family.

Each of the Society Islands had its own Arioi group which was associated with a particular place of worship (marae), and its own leaders of the order. The absolute highest leader was one of the leaders of the order in Raiatea, since the Taputapu-Atea marae, the holiest of all the worship platforms of Polynesia, was located there.

There are special houses on the Society Islands in which the Arioi lived, in which they got together and which served as guest houses for visits by Arioi from other islands. 27 Arioi houses have been documented in Tahiti.

== Initiation ==
Members of all social strata could be admitted into the association. Anyone who wanted to become a member had to be possessed by Oro. This was demonstrated by pushing one's way into a meeting of the Arioi in a trance state. If the Arioi considered the candidate to be suitable, he was admitted. The most important criteria for this were physical beauty, knowledge of religious texts, and skill in recitation, dance and pantomime.

With the initiation, the new member earned the right to wear a bast fiber tapa in certain colors and with certain tattoos, beginning with a small ring-shaped pattern on the ankle. As the member ascended into the upper classes, the tattoos became increasingly large and ornate.

Ruling chiefs had no further to climb and did not have to undergo the initiation and laborious ascent.

== Status ==
The Arioi lived in sexual freedom before marriage, which therefore was repulsive to the missionaries that arrived in the 19th century. After the establishment of a matrimonial bond, though, promiscuity stopped. Arioi unions had to remain childless in a society whose religion was fundamentally characterized by fertility rituals, which was something of a contradiction. If a child was expected, he was aborted or killed immediately after birth. The principal reason for killing the children was the endeavor to prevent people in the upper classes from having children with people in the lower classes in order to keep the ruling line "pure". Another reason could be found in a particular characteristic of Polynesian society, namely that reputation was passed down the male line, and that a father automatically lost a part of his reputation upon the birth of his first son.

In general, they continue in this society to the age of thirty or thirty-five, when by suffering one of their children to survive, they debar themselves of the privileges of an arreoi.

== Religious functions ==
Religious functions in Polynesian society had both religious and political meaning, the latter through displays and pageantry to glorify the ruling family.

Because the reports of the European discoverers and missionaries naturally had to be restricted to publicly observable actions and since taboos excluded outsiders from the rites that took place in the marae, the role the Arioi played in it is not known.

One thing that was publicly observable was the Arioi's involvement in the large celebrations, often lasting for several days. The ariki's reputation depended considerably on the generous distribution of gifts to the people. The products that were delivered by the serfs—usually with great pageantry as part of an extravagantly prepared celebration—were distributed yet again. This served as a means of self-promotion; the more generously a chief behaved, the higher his prestige was. The preparation of dances, dramas, and song for these celebrations was essentially the Arioi's responsibility. Then again, they also profited from the gifts that they gave out and were rewarded with bast fiber tapa as well. The most elaborate celebrations were the visits the Arioi made to other islands. James Cook witnessed one such event in 1774. A fleet of 60 ornately decorated boats, some 50 Arioi in each, departed from Tahiti for a visit to the island of Huahine.

Above all, though, the Arioi were guardians and promoters of tradition. In a society with no writing, it was important to openly preach, protect, and spread religious texts through constant recitation.

The ability of this to relieve tension within the social structure should not be underestimated. The absolutist ruling family of the ariki normally tolerated no dissent whatsoever. However, the Arioi enjoyed a large degree of freedom during their performances to criticize secular and religious leaders in a playful and jocular way.

== The European perspective ==
Portrayals by early European visitors to the Pacific emphasised the erotic aspects of Arioi culture. Reports from missionaries and self-educated travelers such as Johann Reinhold Forster and Moerenhout reflect the prudish society of the late 18th and 19th centuries. An example of this is the following description of the Arioi from James Cook's journal of his first trip in 1769:

Many of these people contract intimacies and live together as man and wife for years, in the course of which the children that are born are destroy'd. They are so far from concealing it that they look upon it as a branch of freedom upon which they value themselves. They are called Arreoys, and have meetings among themselves, where the men amuse themselves with wrestling, etc., and the women in dancing the indecent dance before-mentioned, in the course of which they give full liberty to their desires, but I believe keep up to the appearance of decency.

The 1911 Encyclopædia Britannica describes them thus:

Members included both men and women, were chosen from the nobility. They were divided into seven or more grades, each having its characteristic tattooing. Chiefs were at once qualified for the highest grade, but ordinary members attained promotion only through initiatory rites. The Areois enjoyed great privileges, and were considered as depositaries of knowledge and as mediators between the common folk and the gods. They were also feared as ministers of the taboo and were entitled to pronounce a kind of excommunication for offences against its rules. The main purpose for the existence of this group was the worship of the generative powers of nature, and the ritual and ceremonies of initiation were grossly licentious. But the Areois were also a social force. They aimed at communism in all things. The women members were common property; the period of cohabitation was limited to three days, and the female Areois were bound by oath at initiation to strangle at birth any child born to them. If, however, the infant was allowed to survive half an hour only, it was spared; but to have the right of keeping it the mother must find a male Areoi willing to adopt it. The Areois travelled about, devoting their whole time to feasting, dancing (the chief dance of the women being the grossly indecent Timorodee mentioned by Captain Cook), and debauchery, varied by elaborate realistic stage presentments of the lives and loves of gods and legendary heroes.

Fertility rituals played a central role in Polynesian religion. For this reason, any behavior patterns that seemed risqué to the Europeans were closely linked with religious acts.

== Later organizations ==
The Europeans' missionary work on the Society Islands in the first half of the 19th century signified the end of the Arioi. They were bitterly opposed by the missionaries because of their practices, which stood firmly in opposition to Christian teaching.

The end did not come suddenly, however. As a result of partial inclusion of the Christian body of thought, though preserving the traditional Polynesian structuring, the Mamaia group was formed to succeed the Arioi. The name means "rotten fruit" and was applied discriminatorily. The sect originated in Tahiti in 1826. The founders were two native deacons of the London Missionary Society by the name of Teao and Hue. The millenarianistic movement created visionary prophets, who had allegedly experienced theophanies and Marian apparitions, but they also claimed to have been possessed by Oro and Tāne. In 1831, the missionaries succeeded in temporarily driving the Mamaia from Raiatea Island. There were also rebellions on Tahiti in 1832, though they were suppressed in bloody confrontations with the help of the French. In 1833, the Mamaia were banished from Tahiti. After the death of Teao in 1842, the movement died away.

== Secret societies on other islands ==
Societies that are somewhat comparable to the Arioi can also be found on other Polynesian and Melanesian islands, for example:

- the Kaioi on the Marquesas Islands
- the hālau hula (hula schools) in Hawaiʻi
- with respect to the women, the aualuma and taupou, the female societies of Samoa

== Notes ==
Attribution
