= Sarah Munro (artist) =

New Zealand artist (b. 1970)

- Born: 1970 (age 55–56); New Zealand
- Education: Elam School of Fine Arts
- Known for: sculpture
- Website: Official website

Sarah Munro is a New Zealand artist born in 1970. She attended Elam School of Fine Arts, where she earned a Doctorate in Fine Arts. In 2006, Munro was appointed a Frances Hodgkins Fellow.

Munro combines digital technology with painting to explore the spatial aspects and manual creation of the work. She has created large scale sculptures, but her more recent series Trade Items uses embroidery to reference a 1769 sketch by Tupaia, a Tahitian navigator on Captain Cook's voyages, exploring themes of environmental impacts and cultural significance of trade.

Munro's work is featured in the James Wallace Trust Collection, University of Auckland Art Collection, Hocken Collection, and the Real Art Road-Show Trust Collection.
