= Tupaia (navigator) =

Polynesian navigator

- Born: c. 1725 near Ha'amanino Harbour, Raiatea
- Died: 20 December 1770 (aged around 44–45); Batavia, Dutch East Indies
- Known for: Joining the crew of James Cook as a navigator and translator

Tupaia (also spelled Tupaea or Tupita; c. 1725 – 20 December 1770) was a Polynesian navigator and arioi (a kind of priest), originally from the island of Raʻiātea in the Pacific Islands group known to Europeans as the Society Islands. His remarkable navigational skills and Pacific geographical knowledge were used by Lt. James Cook, R.N. when he took him aboard HMS Endeavour as guide on its voyage of exploration to Terra Australis Incognita. Tupaia travelled with Cook to New Zealand, acting as the expedition's navigator to the Polynesian Māori, and Australia. He died in December 1770 from a shipborne illness contracted when Endeavour was docked in Batavia for repairs ahead of its return journey to England.

== Early life ==
Tupaia was born at Ha'amanino Harbour on Ra'iatea around 1725 and became a leading ariori priest for the Taputapuatea marae. Tupaia was trained in the fare-'ai-ra'a-'upu, or schools of learning, about the origin of the cosmos, genealogies, the calendar, proverbs and histories. He was also taught how to be a star navigator. His knowledge included island lists, including their size, reef and harbor locations, whether they were inhabited, and if so, the name of the chief and any food produced there. More importantly, his skills would include the bearing of each island, the time to get there, and the succession of stars and islands to follow to get there. These islands included the Society Islands, the Austral Islands, the Cook Islands, plus Samoa, Tonga, Tokelau and Rotuma.

Bora Bora warriors invaded Ra'iatea around 1763, wounding Tupaia and forcing him to flee to Tahiti, where he sought protection from the Papara chief Amo and his wife Purea. Tupaia soon became their advisor and high priest, and eventually Purea's lover. Tupaia befriended Samuel Wallis during his observation of a solar eclipse, and then Joseph Banks during the 1769 Transit of Venus observed from Tahiti. After which, Tupaia "attached himself to the British," according to Anne Salmond. Tupaia was also an artist, and ten watercolors of his survive.

== Joining Endeavour ==
"The Captain refuses to take [Tupaia] on his own account, in my opinion sensibly enough, the government will never in all human probability take any notice of him. I therefore have resolved to take him ...

I do not know why I may not keep him as a curiosity, as well as some of my neighbours do lions and tigers at a larger expense than he will probably ever put me to; the amusement I shall have in his future conversation and the benefit he will be to this ship as well as what he may be if another should be sent to these seas, will I think fully repay me."

— Extract of "The Endeavour Journal of Joseph Banks 1768–1771.

Tupaia joined Endeavour in July 1769 when it passed his home island of Ra'iatea in the outward voyage from Plymouth. He was welcomed aboard at the insistence of Sir Joseph Banks, the Cook expedition's official botanist, on the basis of his evident skill as a navigator and mapmaker: when asked for details of the region Tupaia drew a chart showing all 130 islands within a 2,000 miles (3,200 km) radius and was able to name 74 of them. Banks welcomed the Raiatean's interest in travelling with Endeavour to England because of his usefulness for the ship as well as the envisaged conversation and amusement (possibly even genuine friendship according to Australian researcher Vanessa Smith). It was also hoped that he could be presented as an anthropological curiosity in England. As Cook at first refused to allow Tupaia to join the expedition for financial reasons, Banks agreed to be responsible for the Raiatean's welfare and upkeep while on board.

== Expedition and Tupaia's map ==
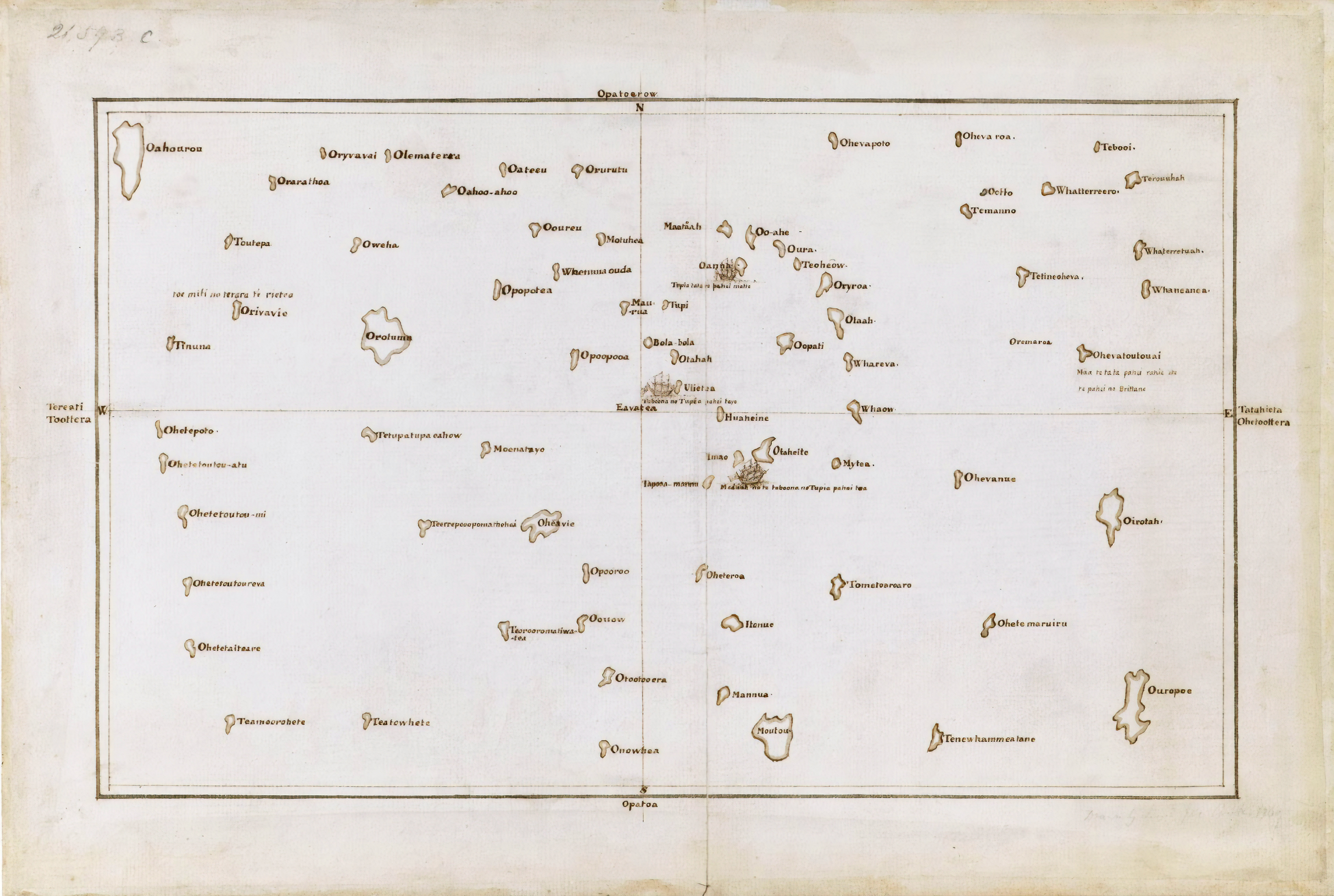
Tupaia's map, c. 1769.

As Cook intended to spend several weeks in the Society Islands before heading south, Tupaia assisted the expedition as an interlocutor and interpreter with local tribes. He also worked closely with Banks in compiling an account of Tahiti and its inhabitants. On August 15, 1769, Tupaia began to work on a Chart of the Pacific Ocean in collaboration with Cook, Banks, and several of Cook's officers.

Older research summarized by Joan Druett assumed that Tupaia's own voyaging experience was limited. It holds that Tupaia had navigated from Ra'iatea in short voyages to 13 islands shown on the resulting map. He had not visited western Polynesia, as since his grandfather's time the extent of voyaging by Raiateans had diminished to the islands of eastern Polynesia. His grandfather and father had passed to Tupaia the knowledge as to the location of the major islands of western Polynesia and the navigation information necessary to voyage to Rotuma, Samoa and Tonga. It was also assumed that Cook was less pleased than Banks with Tupaia's evident navigational skills, resolving instead to rely on his own exploration of the region.

More recent research challenged the view that Tupaia's travels in the wider region were limited, and questioned Cook's failing appreciation of Tupaia as misinterpretations of the source material. In an extended reading of Tupaia's Map, Lars Eckstein and Anja Schwarz propose that Tupaia had detailed navigational knowledge that extended throughout the Polynesian triangle (with the probable exception of only New Zealand). The chart he drew for James Cook in August 1769 shows interconnected voyaging routes ranging from Rotuma west of Samoa, via Samoa and Tonga, the southern Cook Islands and the Austral Group, Mangareva and Pitcairn all the way to Rapa Nui. A second major composite route leads from Tahiti through the Tuamotu Group to the Marquesas Group and on to Oahu in Hawai'i. Tupaia invented a cartographic system for Cook and his men which located a northern bearing from any island he drew in the centre of his Chart (marked by the word 'avatea', this is '[the sun at] noon'). This allowed him to translate his own wayfinding knowledge for island-to-island voyages into the logic and terms of Cook's compass. The Admiralty manuscript of James Cook's journal indicates that Tupaia told Cook that he himself (or his ancestors) travelled to most islands drawn on the Chart excepting only Rotuma (north of Fiji) and Oahu in Hawai'i.

Tupaia accompanied Cook to New Zealand and was welcomed by some of the Māori as a tohunga (an expert). It seems that they presented him with a precious dog-skin cloak.

Many Maori people have tales including Tupaia and his lineage that remains in New Zealand today. The crew of Endeavour had developed a less favorable impression of their shipmate. One, midshipman Joseph Marra, recorded that:

Toobia ... was a man of real genius, a priest of the first order, and an excellent artist: he was, however, by no means beloved by the Endeavours crew, being looked upon as proud and austere, extorting homage, which the sailors who thought themselves degraded by bending to an Indian [sic], were very unwilling to pay, and preferring complaints against them on the most trivial occasions.

Tupaia landed at Botany Bay, Australia, in late April 1770. Cook said of Tupaia, "...by means of Tupaia...you would always get people to direct you from Island to Island and would be sure of meeting with a friendly resception and refreshments at every Island you came to."

== Death ==
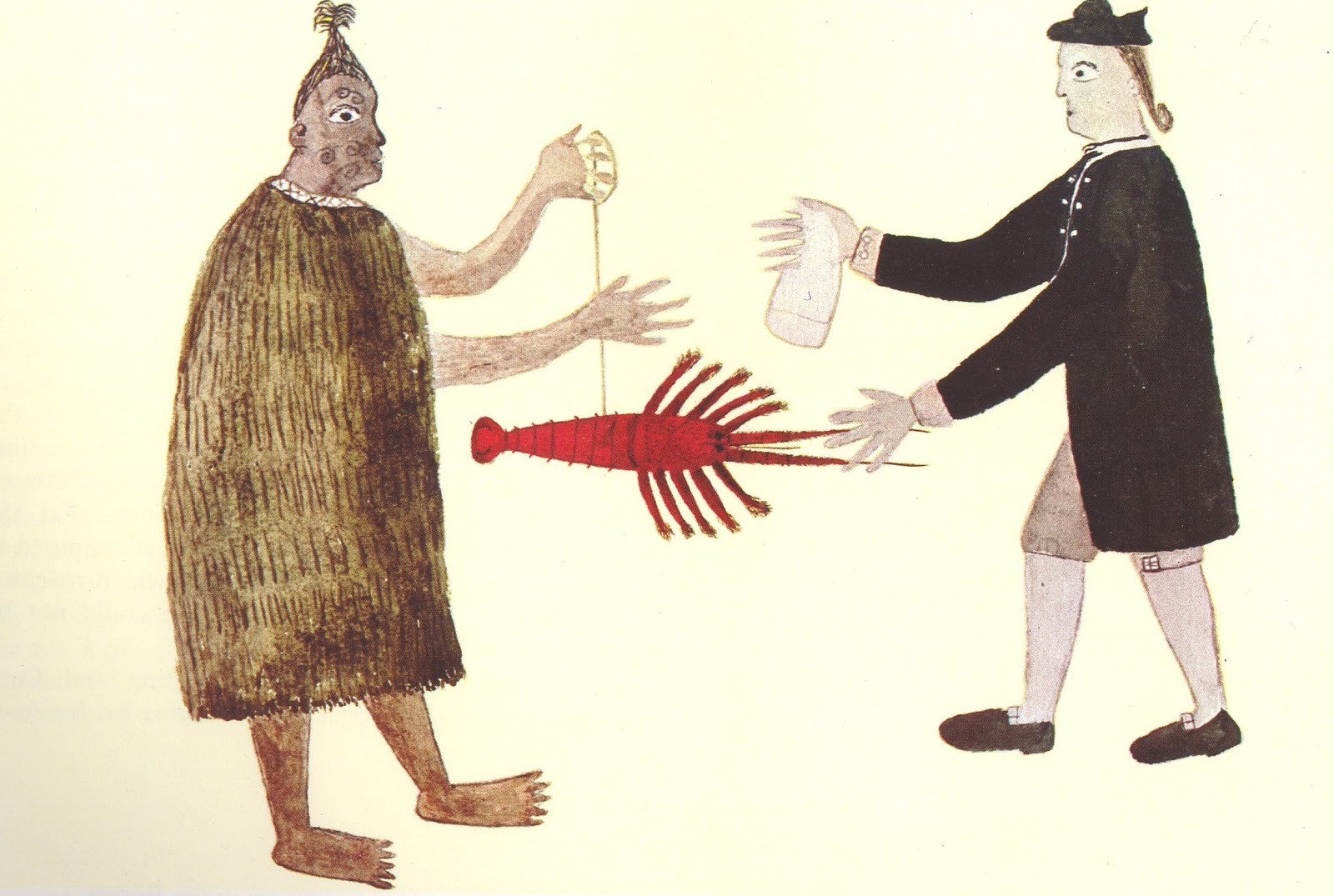
A Māori and Pākehā man trading a crayfish, drawing by Tupaia, c. 1769

Tupaia died on 20 December 1770. This date is confirmed in the muster records of Endeavour. Other dates are suggested by the journals of Joseph Banks and James Cook. Joseph Banks's journal has an entry for 11 November, in which he wrote “We receivd [sic] the news of Tupias death”. However, Banks was ill for much of his time at Batavia, and wrote many entries later on, using incorrect dates. James Cook's journal has an entry for 26 December, in which he wrote “we lost... Tupia”. However, this entry is a summary of several events that occurred during the stay in Batavia.

Tupaia died from either dysentery or malaria, both of which were present aboard Endeavour when berthed for repairs in Batavia. Cook recorded his passing in his journal: "He was a Shrewd, Sensible, Ingenious Man, but proud and obstinate which often made his situation on board both disagreeable to himself and those about him, and tended much to promote the deceases that put a period to his life."

== Legacy ==
When Cook returned to New Zealand in 1773, the Maori approached his ship shouting "Tupaia! Tupaia!". As Cook noted, "...the Name of Tupia was at that time so popular among them that it would be no wonder if at this time it is known over the great part of New Zealand."

=== In popular culture ===
In 2021, a trilingual Tahitian-Māori-English opera was made of the life of Tupaia titled Ihitai 'Avei'a - Star Navigator co-composed by Crowded House's Tim Finn and Tom McLeod for New Zealand Opera; it opened in Auckland March of that year.
