= Lady Penrhyn (ship) =

At least three British ships have been named Lady Penrhyn for Lady Penrhyn (née Anne Susannah Warburton), the wife of Richard Pennant, 1st Baron Penrhyn, of the Penrhyn Estate in Llandygai, North Wales:

- Lady Penrhyn (1783 ship) was an American vessel launched in 1777 that the British captured in 1782. Liverpool merchants purchased her and employed her in the African slave trade between 1783 and 1794. A squadron of the French navy drove her onshore on the coast of Africa in 1794.
- Lady Penrhyn (1786 ship) was built on the River Thames in 1786 as a slave ship. For her first voyage she transported convicts to New South Wales as part of the First Fleet. On her voyage back to Britain she was the first European vessel to pass by the Kermadec Islands, and the Penrhyn Atoll in the Cook Islands. She also carried a cargo for the British East India Company (EIC). The French captured her in the West Indies in 1811 and scuttled her.
- Lady Penrhyn (1875 ship) was a 3-masted iron-hulled barque of 838 GRT, launched at Glasgow in 1875. In October 1909 she stranded at Punta Gallegos; she was condemned in November.
