= Sarah Munro =

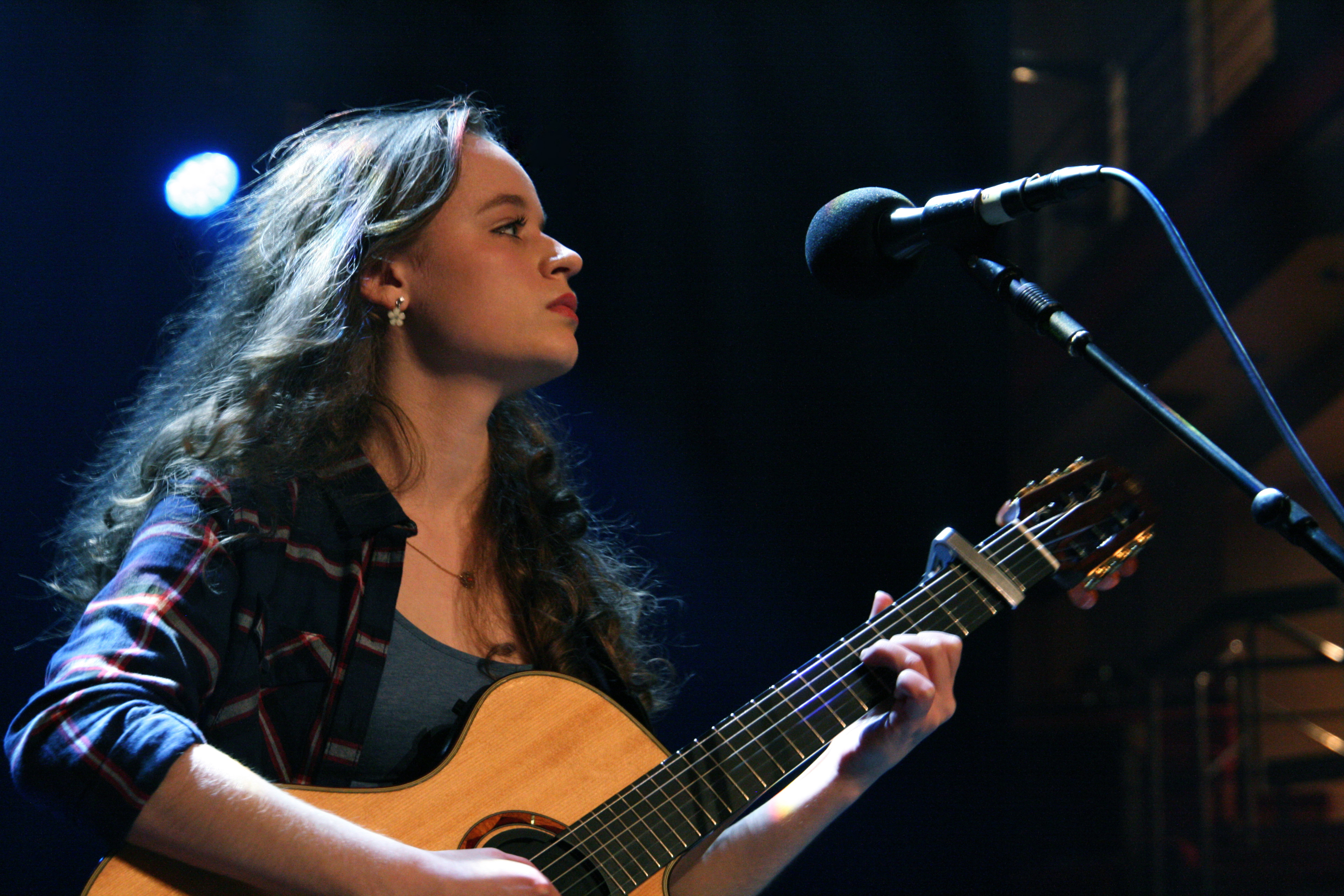
- Sarah Munro performing at The Symphony Hall, Birmingham, 2016

Background information
- Born: 18 May 1996 (age 30); Hertfordshire, England
- Genres: Singer-songwriter, Folk music, Easy Listening, Jazz, Adult contemporary music
- Occupation: Singer-songwriter
- Instruments: Guitar, piano, ukulele
- Years active: 2014–present
- Website: sarahmunromusic.com

Sarah Munro is an English singer-songwriter from Hertfordshire. Her debut album, Say Hello To You, was released on 14 September 2016. Her debut single 'For Eternity' received airplay across BBC Radio 2, in particular from Michael Ball who described her as, "What a gorgeous voice! I think she's absolutely fabulous – real purity and clarity to her voice".

== Early life ==
Sarah attended the secondary school Berkhamsted School, where she performed in the school Big Band, as a member of the choir and regularly at school talent shows, often with her own compositions. In 2013, Munro received the 'Young Musician of the Year' award at Berkhamsted School, for her original composition, which was judged by the English composer Antony Hopkins.

== Career ==
Munro performed at The Cheltenham Jazz Festival after being selected by Jamie Cullum and Jo Whiley to play at a BBC Introducing Showcase on 27 April 2016. Munro has supported Paul Carrack at the Symphony Hall, Birmingham and at the De La Warr Pavilion. Munro has also supported Jimmy Webb, Johnny Hates Jazz and jazz singer Clare Teal. Munro supported Paul Carrack on his 2017 UK tour, performing on all 24 dates at venues including G Live in Guildford, Festival Theatre, Edinburgh and the London Palladium. Munro returned to the Cheltenham Jazz Festival in 2017 as part of a showcase taking place in the PizzaExpress Live Arena. In March 2018, Munro began her first solo headline tour, performing at several venues across the United Kingdom including The Stables. In June 2018, Munro released her second album, Angel Road, composed of 10 original songs. She also performed at Cheltenham Jazz Festival supporting Clare Teal at Cheltenham Town Hall and at Cambridge Folk Festival.

== Discography ==
Title	Date of Release	Type of Release
"For Eternity"	23 December 2015	Digital Single
"Autumn Leaves"	21 April 2016	Digital Single
Say Hello To You	14 September 2016	Album CD
"I'll Be Home For Christmas"	1 December 2016	Digital Single
Angel Road	1 June 2018	Album CD
