= Marian Maguire =

New Zealand lithographer

Marian Maguire (born 1962) is a lithographer from New Zealand. She is known for juxtaposing landscapes, historical characters, and mythical figures from New Zealand and ancient Greece, mixing the realism of 19th-century colonial prints with the more stylized designs of Greek black-figure pottery and Māori wood carvings.

== Life and education ==
Maguire was born in 1962 in Christchurch. She earned a BFA at the University of Canterbury in 1984 and has also studied at the Tamarind Institute in the US. She returned to New Zealand in 1987 and set up a print studio and later a print gallery there. She has also taught printmaking at the Ilam School of Fine Arts at Canterbury.

== Works ==
Maguire's early printmaking work included figures, architectural elements, and (by the late 1990s) ancient Greek culture.

The prints of her work on New Zealand and ancient Greece are organized into series, including:

- Southern Myths (2001), which transported Achilles and Ajax into the New Zealand landscape.
- The Odyssey of Captain Cook (2003–2005), which combined 19th-century historical figures such as Captain Cook and the Māori chief Natai with Greek imagery.
- The Labors of Herakles (2006–2008), in which Hercules takes part in New Zealand events such as the signing of the Treaty of Waitangi.
- Titokowaru's Dilemma (2008–2011), a dialogue on war and passive resistance between Tītokowaru and Socrates that compares scenes from The Iliad with events from Māori history.

In 2015, she shifted media with her series Feats, Pursuits & Endless Toil of seven painted door panels and four etchings, continuing the mixture of Greek and New Zealand themes. The works in this series were partly inspired by Maguire's experiences living through the 2011 Christchurch earthquake.

== Collections ==
Maguire's works are in the collections of the Auckland Art Gallery Toi o Tāmaki, the Museum of New Zealand Te Papa Tongarewa, Puke Ariki, the National Maritime Museum in London, and the British Museum, among others.

== Additional resources ==
- Hughes, Jessica (2012), "Marian Maguire (interview)", Practitioners' Voices in Classical Reception Studies, 3, The Open University
- Titokowaru's dilemma: an interview with Marian Maguire, British Museum, 26 December 2016
- McDonald, Donald (22 October 2016), "Ko wai Koe (Who Are You) 2005 from the series The Odyssey of Captain Cook by Marian Maguire", The Spectator
