= John Watts (Royal Navy officer) =

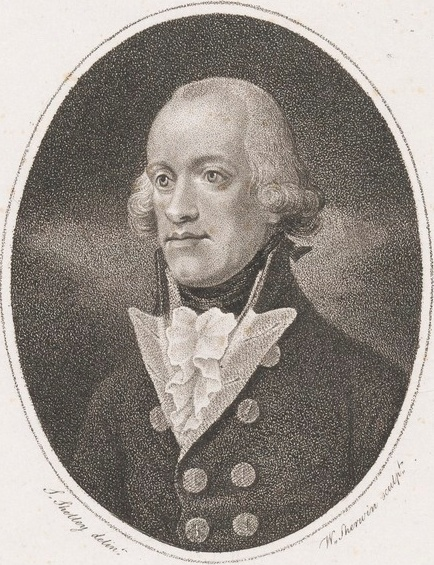
- John Watts in 1779

John Watts (1755–1801) was a Royal Navy officer. He served as a midshipman in Resolution on James Cook's third voyage to the Pacific in 1776–1780. In 1787–1789, while on leave from the navy, he sailed as a passenger on Lady Penrhyn with the First Fleet to New South Wales, and acted as supercargo on the return voyage to England via Canton.

Extracts from Watts's journal of the First Fleet voyage appear in The Voyage of Governor Phillip to Botany Bay, as do three plates after his sketches.
