= John Turnbull (voyager) =

John Turnbull was an English seaman who was most noted for his 1800–1805 voyage to the South Pacific on behalf of the East India Company. During this voyage, an account of which being published in 1810, he made observations in Tahiti, Hawaii, and Australia, that have become important texts to the indigenous and settler histories of those places. Included in these observations were his comments on the mahoo or mahu transgender people of Tahiti, which were transphobic, typically of their time, but part of the LGBT history of the Pacific Islands.
