= Marae =

Communal or sacred place in Polynesian societies

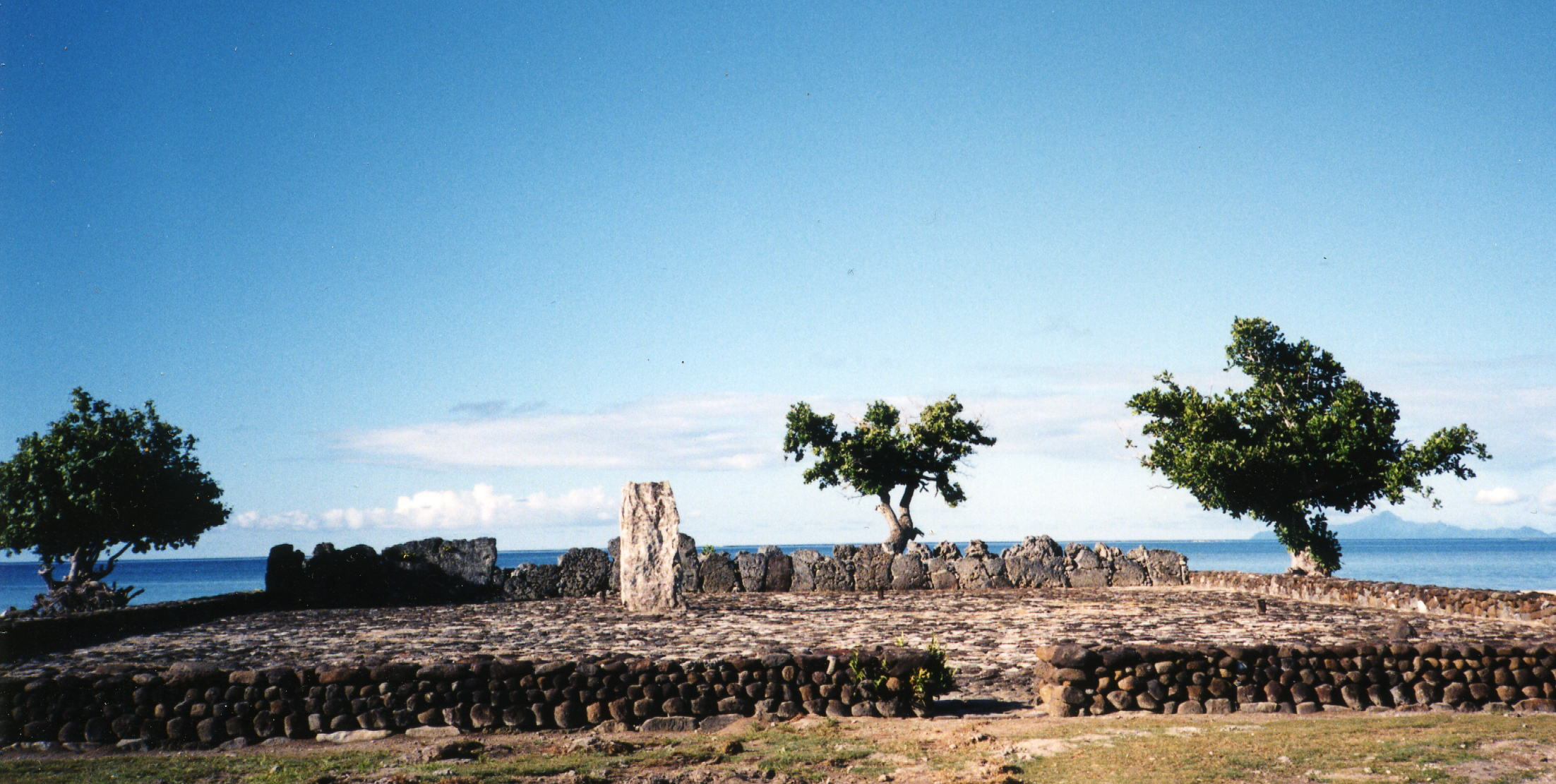
Taputapuātea, an ancient marae constructed of stone on Ra'iātea in the Society Islands of French Polynesia, restored in 1994

A marae (in New Zealand Māori, Cook Islands Māori, Tahitian), malaʻe (in Tongan), meʻae (in Marquesan) or malae (in Samoan) is a communal or sacred place that serves religious and social purposes in Polynesian societies. In all these languages, the term also means cleared and free of weeds or trees. Marae generally consist of an area of cleared land, roughly rectangular (the marae itself), bordered with stones or wooden posts (au in Tahitian and Cook Islands Māori), and perhaps with paepae (terraces) which were traditionally used for ceremonial purposes; in some cases, such as Easter Island, a central stone ahu or a'u is placed. In the Easter Island’s Rapa Nui culture, the term ahu or a'u has become metonymic for the whole marae complex itself.

In some modern Polynesian societies, notably that of the Māori of New Zealand, the marae is still a vital part of everyday life. In tropical Polynesia, most marae were destroyed or abandoned with the arrival of Christianity in the 19th century, and some have become attractions for tourists or archaeologists. Nevertheless, the place where these marae were built are still considered tapu (sacred or forbidden) in most of these cultures.

As is usual with Māori nouns, the same word serves as the singular and plural of marae.

== Etymology ==
The word has been reconstructed by linguists to Eastern Oceanic *malaqe with the meaning "open, cleared space used as meeting-place or ceremonial place".

== New Zealand ==
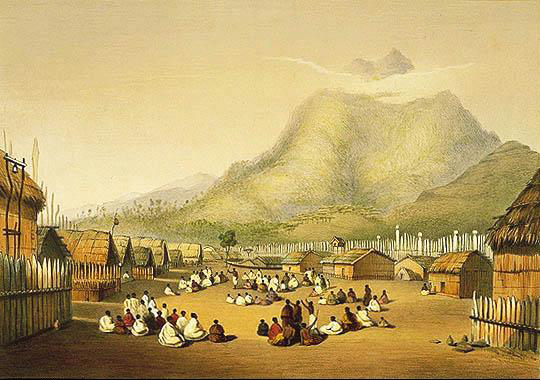
A marae at Kaitotehe, near Taupiri mountain, Waikato district, 1844. It was associated with Pōtatau Te Wherowhero, a chief who became the first Māori king.

In Māori society, the marae is a place where the culture can be celebrated, where the Māori language can be spoken, where intertribal obligations can be met, where customs can be explored and debated, where family occasions such as birthdays can be held, and where important ceremonies, such as welcoming visitors or farewelling the dead (tangihanga), can be performed. Like the related institutions of old Polynesia, the marae is a wāhi tapu, a 'sacred place' which carries great cultural meaning.

In Māori usage, the marae ātea (often shortened to marae) is the open space in front of the wharenui (meeting house; literally "large building"). Generally the term marae is used to refer to the whole complex, including the buildings and the ātea. This area is used for pōwhiri (welcome ceremonies) featuring oratory. The meeting house is considered the realm of the peace deity Rongo while the surrounding marae for the opposite Tūmatauenga. Some iwi (tribes) and hapū (sub-tribes) do not allow women to perform oratory on their marae, though typically women perform a karanga ('call'). The wharenui is the locale for important meetings, sleepovers, and craft and other cultural activities.

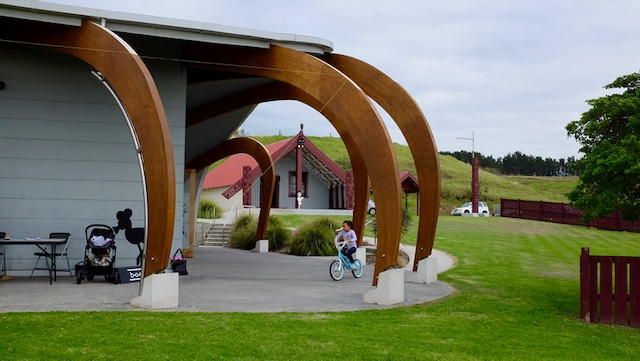
A modern wharekai overlooks the wharenui at the Ōtamarākau marae in New Zealand's Bay of Plenty region.

The wharekai (dining hall) is used primarily for communal meals, but other activities may be carried out there.

Many of the words associated with marae in tropical Polynesia are retained in the Māori context. For example, the word paepae refers to the bench where the speakers sit; this means it retains its sacred and ceremonial associations. Marae vary in size, with some wharenui being a bit bigger than a double garage, and some being larger than a typical town hall.

=== Legal status ===
A marae is a meeting place registered as a reserve under the Te Ture Whenua Māori Act 1993 (The Māori Land Act). Each marae has a group of trustees who are responsible for the operations of the marae. The Act governs the regulation of marae as reservations and sets out the responsibilities of the trustees in relation to the beneficiaries. Generally each marae has a charter which the trustees have negotiated with the beneficiaries of the marae. The charter details matters such as:

- the name of the marae, and a description of it;
- a list of the beneficiaries: usually iwi (tribes/nations), hapū (clans) or whānau (families); in some cases, the marae is dedicated to the common good of the people of New Zealand.
- the methods used to select trustees;
- general governing principles of the marae;
- the ways in which the trustees may be held accountable by the beneficiaries, and methods for conflict resolution;
- principles governing appointment and recognition of committees to administer the marae;
- procedures for amending the charter, and for ensuring adherence to its principles.

The New Zealand Māori Arts and Crafts Institute Act 1963 was passed and the institute built to maintain the tradition of whakairo. The Institute is responsible for the building and restoration of over 40 marae around the country.

=== Traditional, church, and educational uses ===
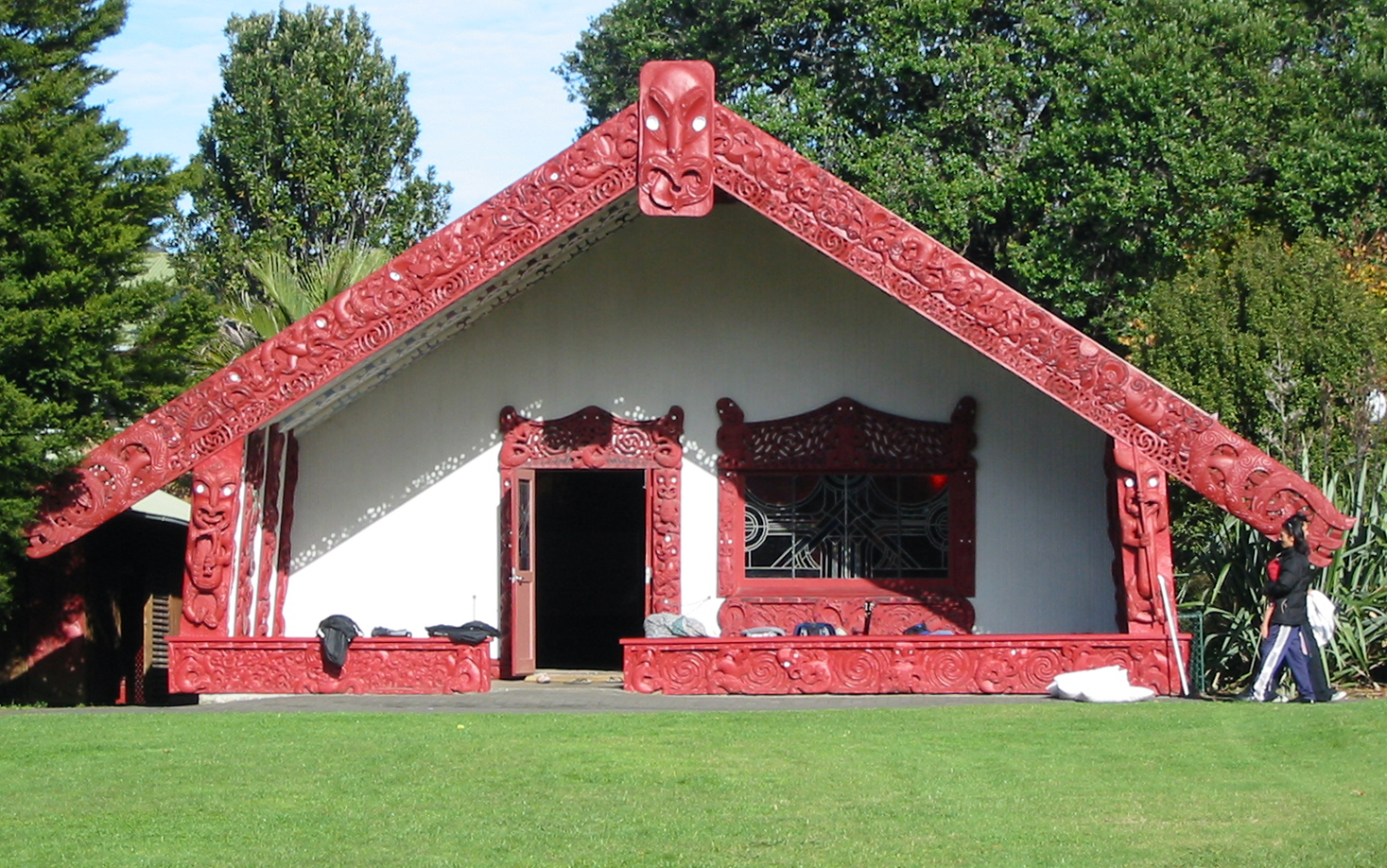
Waipapa marae, University of Auckland, New Zealand. The grassed area in front of the meeting house is the marae ātea.

Most iwi, hapū, and even many small settlements have their own marae. An example of such a small settlement with its own marae is at Hongoeka Bay, Plimmerton, the home of the renowned writer Patricia Grace. Since the second half of the 20th century, Māori in urban areas have been establishing intertribal marae such as Maraeroa in eastern Porirua. For many Māori, the marae is just as important to them as their own homes.

Some New Zealand churches also operate marae of their own, in which all of the functions of a traditional marae are carried out. Churches operating marae include the Anglican, Presbyterian, and Catholic churches. In recent years, it has become common for educational institutions, including primary and secondary schools, technical colleges, and universities, to build marae for the use of the students and for the teaching of Māori culture. These marae may also serve as a venue for the performance of official ceremonies relating to the school.

The marae of the University of Auckland, for instance, is used for graduation ceremonies of the Māori Department, as well as welcoming ceremonies for new staff of the university as a whole. Its primary function is to serve as a venue for the teaching of whaikōrero (oratory), Māori language and culture, and important ceremonies for distinguished guests of the university. Two detailed secondary-school marae are located in the Waikato at Te Awamutu College and Fairfield College. The latter was designed by a Māori architect with a detailed knowledge of carving and weaving; its wharenui features an intricately carved revolving pou (pillar) as well as many other striking features. In addition to school activities, it is used for weddings.

Marae are increasingly viewed as a community resource for the wider community, not just Māori, in New Zealand.

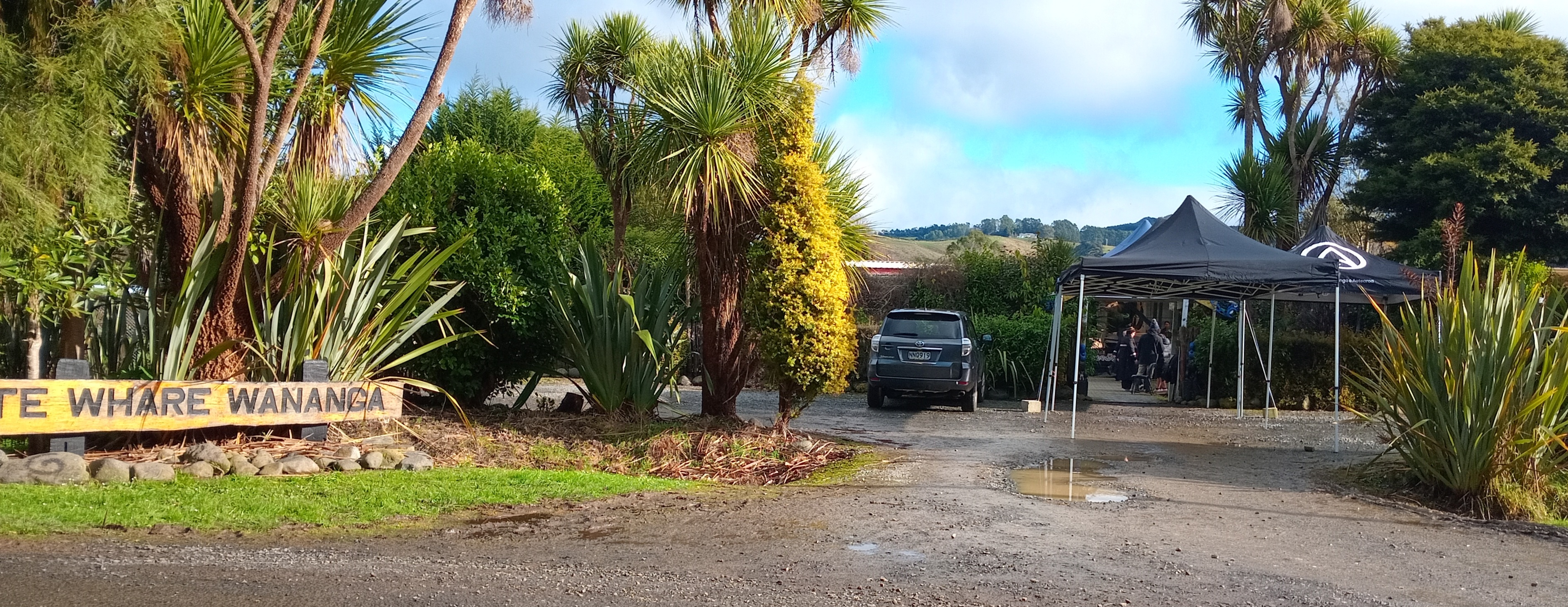
Te Whare Wananga, the marae at Waitati, near Dunedin: as the name implies, education is a feature of the many activities held here.

==== Tangihanga (funeral rites) ====
As in pre-European times, marae continue to be the location of many ceremonial events, including birthdays, weddings, and anniversaries. The most important event located at marae is the tangihanga. Tangihanga are the means by which the dead are farewelled and the surviving family members supported in Māori society. As indicated by Ka'ai and Higgins, "the importance of the tangihanga and its central place in marae custom is reflected in the fact that it takes precedence over any other gathering on the marae".

== Cook Islands ==
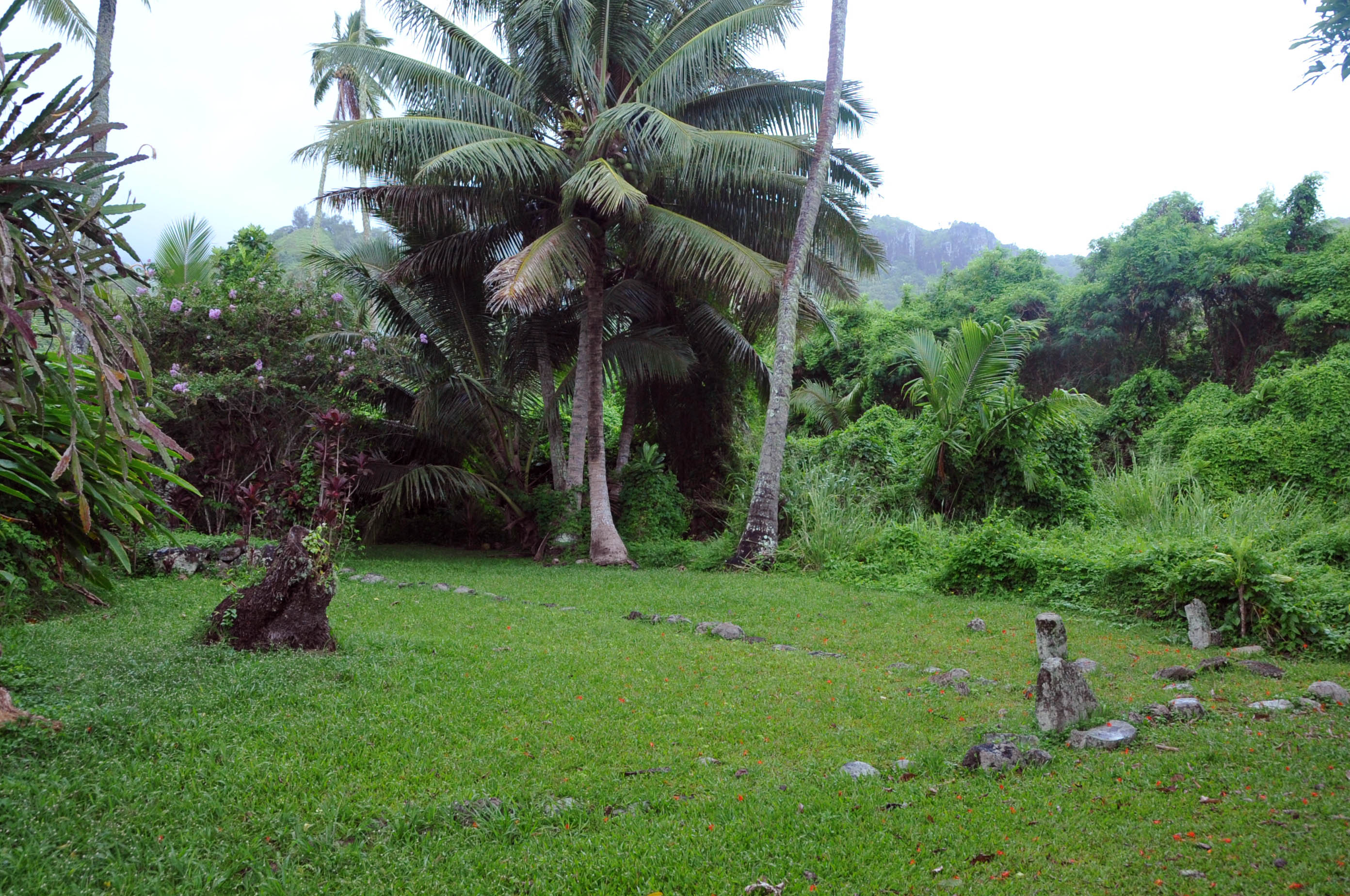
Arai-te-Tonga marae, Rarotonga

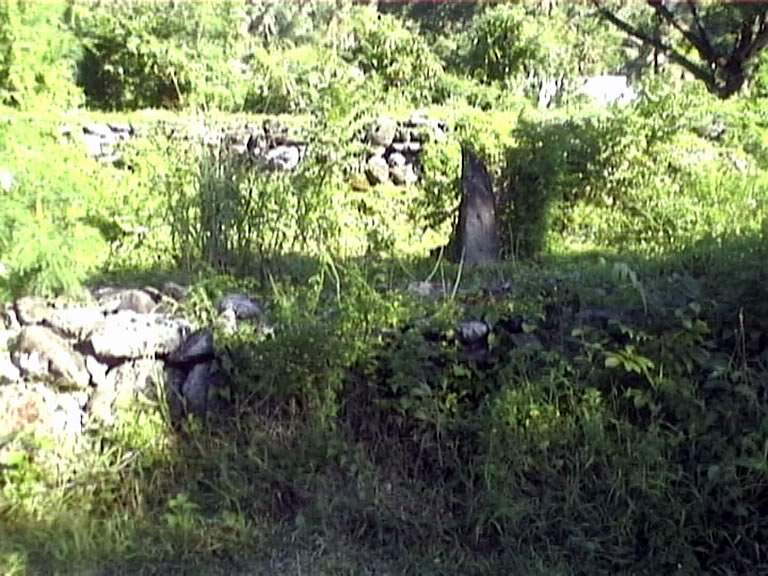
Taputapuātea marae in Avarua

In the Cook Islands, there are many historic marae (tapu or sacred places) that were used for religious ceremonies on the islands. Rarotonga and Aitutaki have some particularly impressive marae. Although many of the carved figures on the marae were either destroyed or confiscated by Christian missionaries, the stones of many of the ancient marae remain to this day. Some marae are in better shape than others, as vegetation grows fast on the islands. In Rarotonga, a few of the marae (Arai-te-Tonga, Vaerota, Taputapuātea) are still maintained, and are quickly tidied up before the investiture of a new ariki.

Rarotongan tradition holds that Taputapuātea marae at Rarotonga, which archaeologists have dated to the 13th century, was built by Tangi'ia who brought the central stone with him from the ancient marae of the same name at Ra'iātea. Indeed, it seems that it was quite usual in ancient times to take a stone from this marae.

The son of Tetupaia and Teu had not only the right to a seat in the great Marae of Taputapuatea in Raiatea, but he could take his stone from Taputapuatea and set it up in his own district of Pare Arue (Tahiti), so founding a Marae Taputapuatea of his own to wear the Maro-'ura (red waist girdle of the ariki) in.

Mangaia had a marae named Taputapuatea and an ariori (priest) house.

== Rapa Nui/Easter Island ==
In the remote southeastern corner of the Polynesian Triangle elements of the traditional Polynesian marae evolved into the Rapa Nui/Easter Island ahu and their iconic moai (statues).

== Tahiti ==
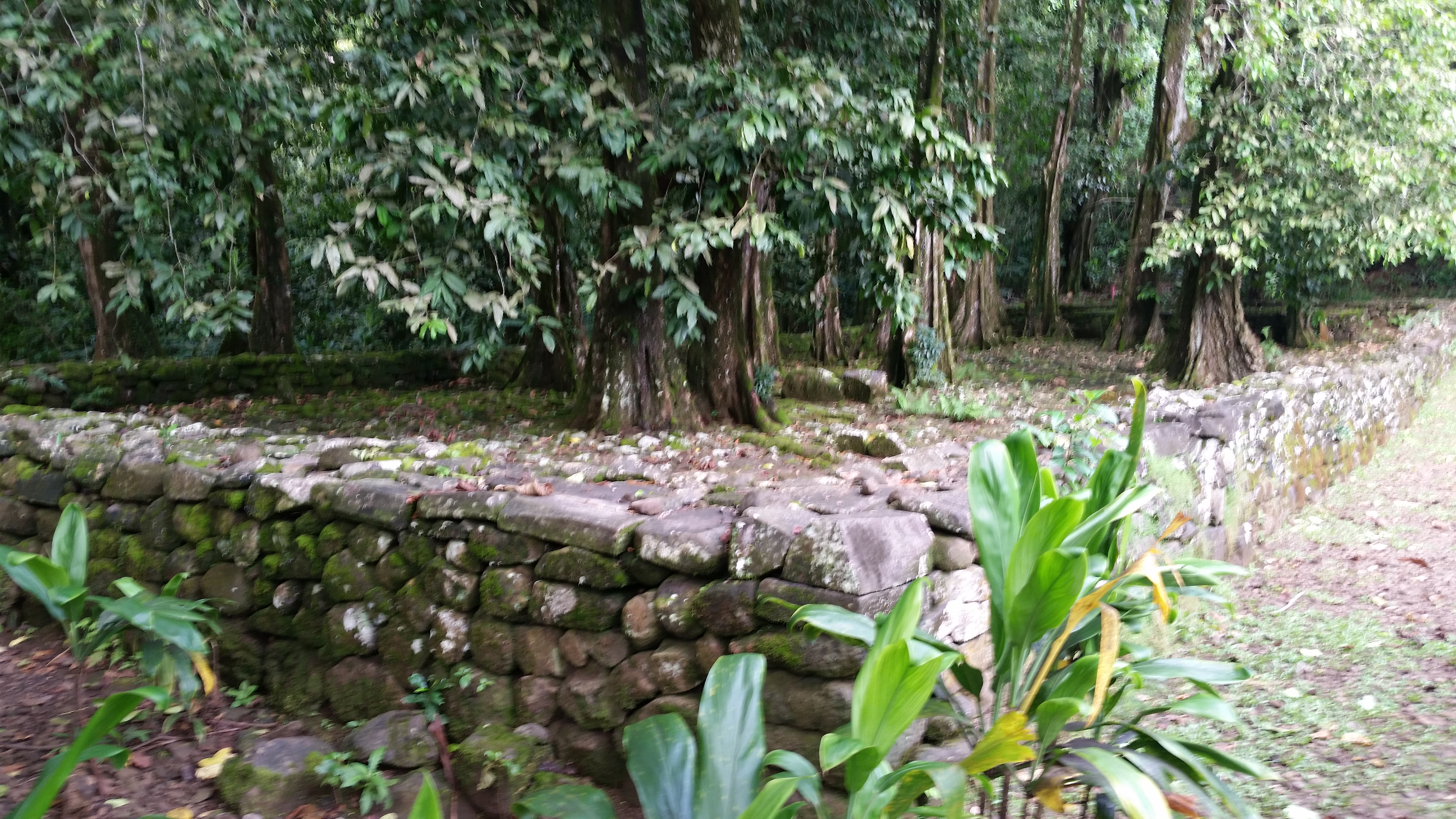
Marae Tiʻi-rua, Mo'orea, French Polynesia

According to Anne Salmond, marae are "portals between Po, the world of the gods and darkness, and the Ao, the everyday world of people and light, so that people could communicate with their ancestors." Notable marae include Vai'otaha marae on Borabora, Mataʻireʻa marae on Huahine, and Taputapuātea marae, a UNESCO World Heritage site on Raʻiātea, considered to be one of the most sacred sites in Polynesia.

ʻOro marae on Tahiti included Vaiʻotaha marae at Tautira, the first, followed by Utu-ʻai-mahurau at Paea, Mahaiatea marae at Papara, Tarahoʻi marae at Pare-ʻArue, and Hitiaʻa marae on Hitiaa O Te Ra.

In Tahiti, marae were dedicated to specific deities, and also connected with specific lineages said to have built them. During the 1994 restoration of Taputapuātea marae at Raʻiātea by archaeologists from the Tahiti Museum, human bones were discovered under some of the structures. It is possible they were the remains of human sacrifices to the god ʻOro, revered in Tahiti.

== See also ==
- Lists of marae in New Zealand
- Heiau (Hawaii)
- Dap-ay (Philippines)
