= Sarah Munroe Three-Decker =

Historic house

- U.S. National Register of Historic Places
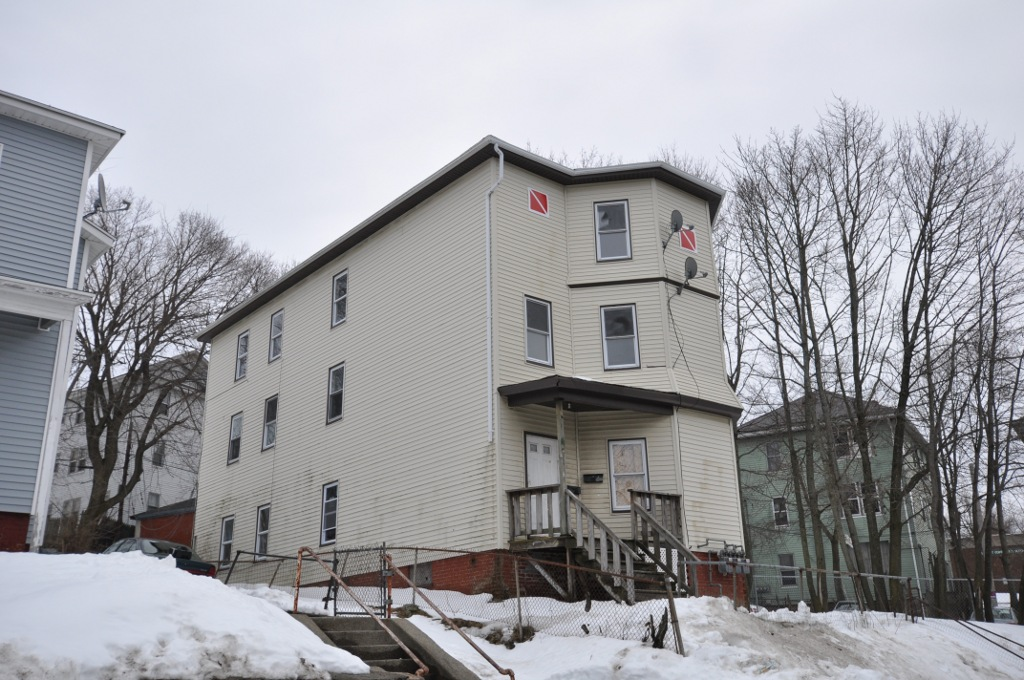

- Location within Massachusetts Location within the United States
- Location: 11 Rodney St., Worcester, Massachusetts
- Coordinates: 42°16′23″N 71°47′15″W
- Area: less than one acre
- Built: c. 1892
- Architectural style: Queen Anne
- MPS: Worcester Three-Deckers TR
- NRHP reference No.: 89002432
- Added to NRHP: February 9, 1990

The Sarah Munroe Three-Decker (or Monroe) is a historic triple decker house in Worcester, Massachusetts. The house was built c. 1892, and was noted for its Queen Anne styling when it was listed on the National Register of Historic Places in 1990. Many of these details have subsequently been lost due to alteration (see photo).

== Description and history ==
The Sarah Monroe Three-Decker is located in Worcester's eastern Belmont Street neighborhood, on the east side of Rodney Street just north of Belmont Street (Massachusetts Route 9). It is a three-story wood-frame structure, with a hip roof and exterior finished in modern siding. The main roof has deep eaves, which were originally adorned with paired carved brackets and modillion blocks. The facade is asymmetrical, with a projecting three-story polygonal window bay on the right, and a single-story porch on the left, sheltering the entrance. The porch was originally an elaborate Queen Anne construction, with turned posts and balustrade. The exterior of the house also originally had more elaborate styling, with bands of wooden shingles between the floors in the projecting bay. The house follows a typical side-hall three-decker plan, with a long projecting side jog on the right side.

The house was built about 1892, during the early phase of triple-decker development in the Belmont Hill area. This area was a popular residential destination for Swedish and Finnish immigrants, who were employed steel and wire factories in northern Worcester. The first documented owner was Sarah Monroe, who also lived here. Most of the documented early tenants were wireworkers, laborers, and machinists.

== See also ==
- National Register of Historic Places listings in eastern Worcester, Massachusetts
