= Taputapuatea marae =

Large marae complex in Raiatea

Taputapuātea
UNESCO World Heritage Site
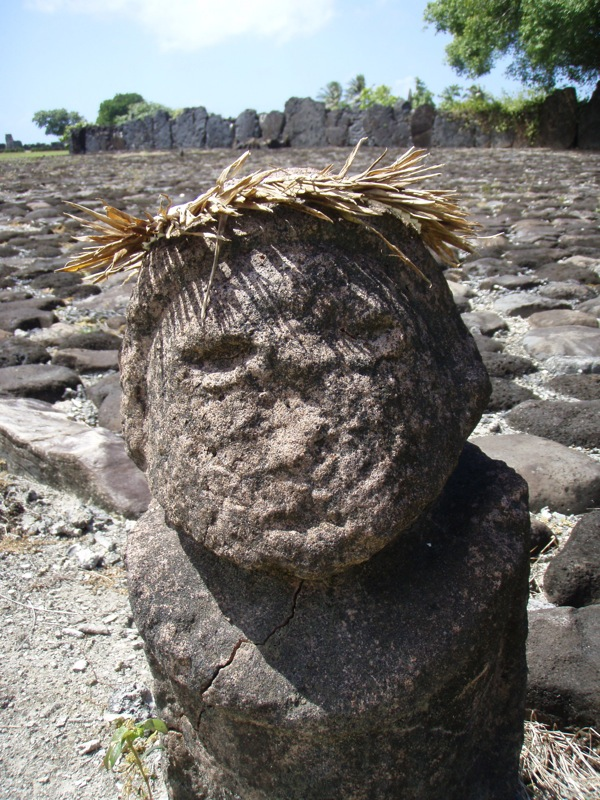
- Tiki on the marae at Taputapuatea

- Location within French Polynesia Location within Oceania
- Location: Taputapuatea, Raiatea, French Polynesia, France
- Part of: Taputapuātea
- Criteria: Cultural: (iii)(iv)(vi)
- Reference: 1529
- Inscription: 2017 (41st Session)
- Coordinates: 16°50′10″S 151°21′33″W

Marae Taputapuatea is a large marae complex at Opoa in Taputapuatea, on the eastern coast of Raiatea. The site features a number of marae and other stone structures and was once considered the central temple and religious center of Eastern Polynesia. In 2017, the Taputapuatea area and the marae complex were inscribed on the UNESCO World Heritage List because of its political and religious significance and its testimony to traditional eastern Polynesian culture.

== Description ==
The marae complex is positioned at the end of a peninsula that juts into the lagoon surrounding Raiatea. The center of the complex contains the marae itself: a rectangular courtyard paved with basalt and measuring 44 by 60 metres (144 by 197 ft). At the east end of the marae is the ahu, a basalt and coral platform used for ceremonies. Other marae are within the marae complex, including marae Hauviri, which was used for the naming of chiefs.

== History ==
The sacred area of Cape Matahira-i-te-ra'i is called Te Po, where the gods reside. The original marae was dedicated to Ta'aroa (the supreme creator), although eventually the worship of 'Oro (the god of life and death) prevailed. According to legend, 'Oro's descendant Hiro built the marae, giving it the name Taputapuatea, 'Sacrifices from afar'. The drum Ta'imoana was used during human sacrifices. The white rock Te Papatea-o-Ru'ea on the nearby beach (currently part of marae Hauviri) was used to invest the chiefs of Ra'iatea with the red feather girdle maro 'ura. The three foot high image of the god was called 'Oro-maro-'ura, 'Oro of the red feather girdle. Taputapuatea became the center of a voyaging network as the cult of 'Oro spread.

The marae may have been established as early as AD 1000, and it was expanded and rebuilt on at least two separate occasions between the 14th and 18th centuries. The marae was a place of learning where priests and navigators from all over the Pacific would gather to offer sacrifices to the gods and share their knowledge of the genealogical origins of the universe, and of deep-ocean navigation.

An alliance known as Fa'auta Aroha, meaning "Friendly alliance" was established that brought together two widespread Polynesian regions, and was maintained by a regular meeting of chiefs. This alliance included the Cook Islands, the Australs, Kapukapuakea in Hawaii, and Māori in New Zealand. New marae were established on each of these islands with a rock being taken from Taputapuatea, Raiatea, to act as a spiritual link. Priests, chiefs, and warriors from the other islands gathered on Raiatea periodically to maintain the alliance, participating in human sacrifices to 'Oro. However, the alliance was finally broken when fighting broke out at a gathering and the two leading high priests representing the alliance were killed. The people of Ao-tea fled the island, leaving via the reef passage of Te Ava-rua rather than the sacred passage of Te Ava-mo'a, which was considered a bad omen. An attempt was made in 1995 to heal this wrongdoing.

Around 1763, warriors from Bora Bora attacked the island, defeating Tupaia, and ransacked the island. This included destroying the god-houses at Taputapuatea, wrecking the platform, and cutting down the sheltering trees. James Cook, Joseph Banks, Daniel Solander and Tupaia arrived aboard the Endeavour on 20 July 1769, to take possession of Raiatea, Taha'a, Huahine and Bora Bora in the name of King George III of the United Kingdom. This seemed to be the culmination of a prophecy made by the wizard priest Vaita that a new people would arrive aboard a canoe without an outrigger and take possession of the islands. In the early 19th century, missionaries arrived on the island, and the marae complex was abandoned shortly thereafter

== Research and restoration ==
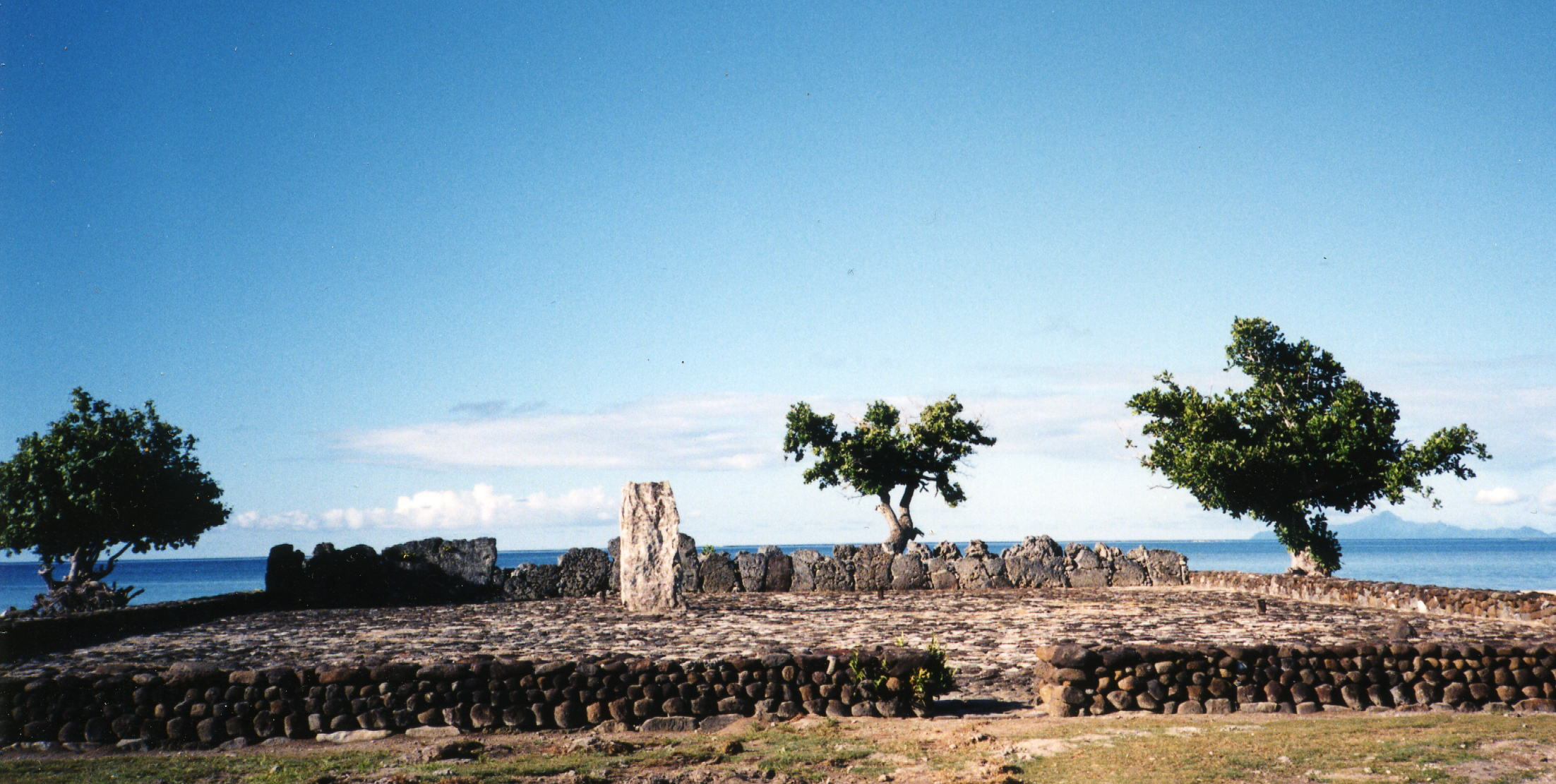
View of a marae at the archaeological complex of Taputapuatea, restored in 1994

When Te Rangi Hīroa visited Taputapuatea in 1929 he was overcome by the desolate state in which he found this great marae and wrote:

I had made my pilgrimage to Taputapu-atea, but the dead could not speak to me. It was sad to the verge of tears. I felt a profound regret, a regret for—I knew not what. Was it for the beating of the temple drums or the shouting of the populace as the king was raised on high? Was it for the human sacrifices of olden times? It was for none of these individually but for something at the back of them all, some living spirit and divine courage that existed in ancient times of which Taputapu-atea was a mute symbol. It was something that we Polynesians have lost and cannot find, something that we yearn for and cannot recreate. The background in which that spirit was engendered has changed beyond recovery. The bleak wind of oblivion had swept over Opoa. Foreign weeds grew over the untended courtyard, and stones had fallen from the sacred altar of Taputapu-atea. The gods had long ago departed.

The archaeological remains of Marae Taputapuatea were restored in 1994 and work to preserve the site continues.

Association Na Papa E Va'u Raiatea is a cultural association formed by the people of Opoa acting for the preservation of the Marae Taputapuatea. Thanks to its work, Marae Taputapuatea is listed on the World Heritage List since July 9, 2017. The association is creating and reviving connections between communities of the Polynesian triangle and throughout the Pacific region.
