= ʻOro =

God of the Polynesian pantheon

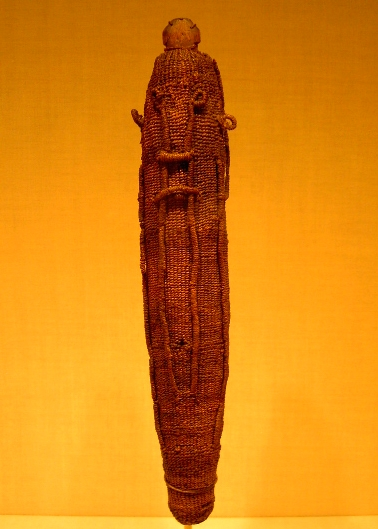
A sacred god figure wrapping for the war god ʻOro, made of woven dried coconut fibre (sennit), which would have protected a Polynesian god effigy (toʻo), made of wood. The mana of the god was symbolised by feathers, usually red in colour, which were attached to the surface of the woven covering. Figure held at the Metropolitan Museum of Art in New York.

ʻOro is a god in Tahiti and Society Islands mythology. The veneration of ʻOro, although practiced in varying intensity among the islands, was a major religion of the Society Islands in the 17th and 18th centuries, especially Tahiti, Tahaa, Moorea, and Raiatea. On Tahiti, ʻOro was the main deity and the god of war. The secret society of Arioi was closely linked because of its rites. On the Marquesas Islands, ʻOro bore the name Mahui.

== Origins ==
Four main gods were venerated on the Society Islands: Taʻaroa, originally the god of the sea and fishing, Tane, god of the forest and handicrafts, Tu, the old god of war and Roʻo, god of agricultural products and the weather. These main gods were also venerated on the other Polynesian islands.

The colonists who settled as part of the Polynesian expansion spread their religion amongst the various islands. Over the centuries the continual movement and developments of the original society groups brought about local differences and adaptations of the cult within the Polynesian Triangle.

On the island of Raiatea the priests elevated the god Taʻaroa from the role of sea god - already an important function in a maritime society - to the god responsible for creating the world. A possible explanation for this is that the ariki, the hereditary chiefs and members of the highest noble ranks on Raiatea, could trace their lineage directly to Taʻaroa. A further development of this cult was the veneration of ʻOro, the son of Taʻaroa and Hina tu a uta, to whom the marae Taputapuatea in the Opoa valley on Raiatea is dedicated. According to tradition, Taputapuatea is the mythical birthplace of ʻOro. The cult of Taʻaroa also spread to the Cook Islands, the Tuamotu Archipelago and Mangareva. Large islands, such as New Zealand and Hawaii, remained unaffected by the cult and its developments and Taʻaroa retains his original function there as god of the sea. Similarly, on many of the other islands of the south Pacific ʻOro did not have the same superior function as on Tahiti and Raiatea.

Due to the growing influence of Taputapuatea - one can characterize it as a type of central pilgrimage site - ʻOro gained more political power and religious influence within the Polynesian pantheon. On the neighboring island of Tahiti the veneration of ʻOro grew in importance during the late proto-historical or early historical period and can be seen as a clear step from Polytheism to Monotheism. This development was substantially driven by the influential secret society of Arioi, who were of great religious and political importance. From within their ranks came the upper echelons of the nobility and the priesthood. The Arioi could trace the foundation of their order back to the god ʻOro himself.

On Tahiti ʻOro was the god of war, who in times of peace became the god of the fine arts. Not only pigs but also humans were sacrificed to him. During his third voyage in 1777 James Cook was witness to such a human sacrifice. The prisoner was held securely on a platform whilst a priest smashed his skull with a holy mace.

== Legends ==
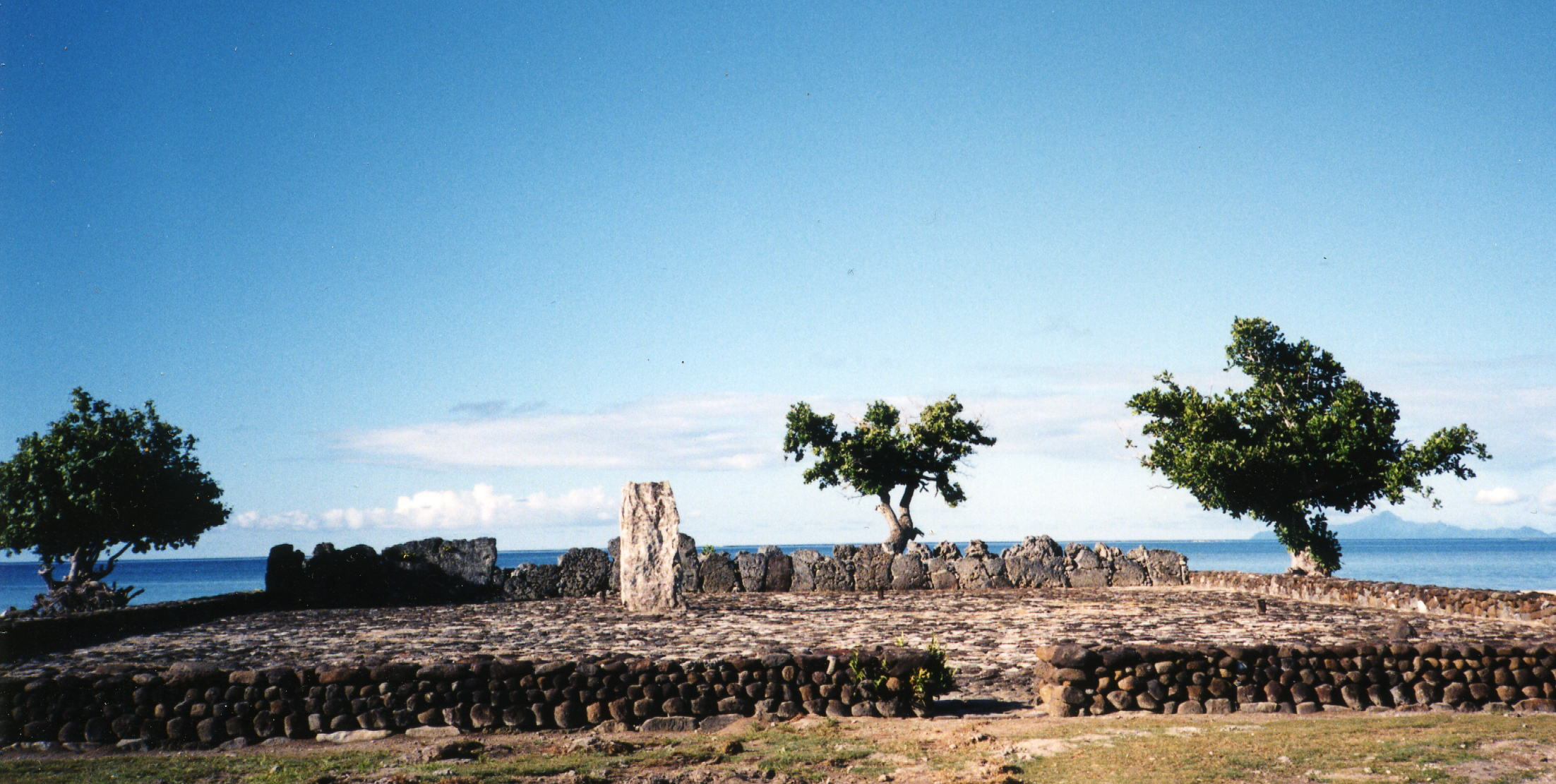
Taputapuatea marae on Raiatea

According to legend ʻOro lived with his sisters Teouri and Oaaoa on Mount Pahia on the island of Bora Bora. He asked his sisters for help in finding a suitable wife and descended to earth on a rainbow in the guise of a warrior. His search of the various islands at first proved futile, which also saddened his sisters. In the course of their journey home to Pahia the sisters arrived in the village of Vaitape, near Vaiʻotaha marae on Bora Bora. There they spotted Vairaumati, a beautiful young woman bathing in a pool of water. The sisters told ʻOro of their encounter and he decided to make Vairaumati his wife. Vairaumati found this young, strong warrior attractive. Every morning ʻOro would descend to earth to meet Vairaumati and then leave again in the evening to return to Pahia. ʻOro's brothers ʻOro-tetefa and Uru-tetefa, transformed themselves into a bunch of red feathers and a pregnant sow as wedding gifts.

Vairumati gave birth to a son, who one day would become a powerful chieftain. ʻOro flew across the sky in the shape of a flame and made Vairaumati into a goddess.

The rainbow is also a symbol in Hawaiian mythology, even though the cult of ʻOro is a relatively late creation, coming about sometime after the settlement of the Hawaiian Archipelago by Polynesians from the Society Islands. In Hawaii the god Lono also descended to earth on a rainbow. The motif of the marriage of a human woman with a god descended from the sky is recurrent in Polynesian mythology, as well as being evident in numerous other mythologies from various cultures.

== Manifestations ==
Polynesian gods manifest themselves in two different ways: as "Ata" and as "Toʻo".

Ata was a natural object or artefact sought after by humans that would symbolise the incarnation of the gods. For the god ʻOro this was as either:

- ʻOro-i-te-maro-tea: (ʻOro of the yellow belt), the manifestation of ʻOro as a light yellow thrush.
- ʻOro-i-te-maro-ura: (ʻOro of the red belt), the manifestation of ʻOro as a red-green Aʻa-bird.

Toʻo was a man-made object, for example a figure made of wood or stone, that presented a figurative image of the god. On Tahiti the god ʻOro was presented in an effigy wrapped in coconut fibers with a mace-shaped wooden "soul" in the middle. Red and yellow feathers—the symbols of the god—were placed within the layers of coconut fiber. The Toʻo was stored and kept safe on the ceremonial platform and would be regularly re-clothed in tapa fiber during a complicated ceremony. This ritual possibly has to do with the local burial cult where the body would be swathed in tapa.
