= Teriimaevarua =

Teriimaevarua may refer to:

- Teriimaevarua II (1841–1873), Queen of Bora Bora
- Teriimaevarua III (1871–1932), Queen of Bora Bora
