= Teriitaria =

Teriitaria or Teri'itaria or Teri'itari'a may refer to:

- Teriitaria I (1769–1793), King of Huahine
- Teriitaria II (1790–1858), Queen Huahine and Maiao
- Teriitaria, personal name of Pōmare III (1820–1827), King of Tahiti
- Teriitaria, personal name of Pōmare V (1839–1891), last king of Tahiti
