= Kingdom of Bora Bora =

18th c. Polynesian kingdom

Kingdom of Bora-Bora Royaume de Bora-Bora
- Early 19th century–1895
- Flag

- Capital: Nunue; Vaitape
- Common languages: Tahitian; French
- Religion: Tahitian, Christianity
- Government: Monarchy
- Monarch
  - 1778–1812: Tapoa I (first)
  - 1873–1895: Teriimaevarua III (last)
- History
  - Established: Early 19th century
  - Annexed by France: 19 March 1888
  - Abdication of Teriimaevarua III: 21 September 1895
- Currency: French franc Pound sterling
Succeeded by
French Polynesia

The Kingdom of Bora Bora was established during the early 19th century with the unification of the island of Bora Bora and official recognition by France and the United Kingdom in 1847 through the Jarnac Convention. It was one of a number of independent Polynesian states in the Society Islands, alongside Tahiti, Huahine and Raiatea in the 19th century, which all shared a similar language and culture and whose rulers were interrelated by marriage. Besides Bora Bora, the Kingdom encompassed the islands of Tupai, Maupiti, Maupihaa, Motu One, and Manuae. The Kingdom was finally annexed to France in 1888 and its last queen Teriimaevarua III was replaced by a French vice-resident in 1895.

== Pre-contact period ==
The history of Bora Bora is marked by the rivalry of two clans: one based near Faanui, consisting of families attached to the marae Farerua, and the other consisting of the families of Nunue and Anau around the marae Vaiotaha, which was long among the most important marae of Polynesia.

There was also a rivalry between Bora Bora and Raʻiātea for religious power. Initially, there was a similarity between the institutions of Bora Bora and Raiatea, which suggests that the two islands exercised joint religious and political authority over the other Leeward Islands. However, Raiatea ultimately became the center of religious power, while Bora-Bora retained a particularly strong military power, expressed both in internal wars and in wars with rival islands.

According to Tupaia, who came from Raʻiātea, Bora Bora was originally a place of exile for thieves and other wrongdoers. These outcasts eventually became pirates, who raided the other islands. In the 18th century a great chief, Puni (Teihotu Matarua), succeeded in dominating the island's other clans. He then conquered Tahaa and attacked Raʻiātea, which he conquered in 1763 after a three-year campaign. In 1769, when James Cook landed at Tahaa and Raʻiātea, the islands were still dominated by Puni and his Bora Bora warriors.

At Puni's death, his nephew Tapoa I, paramount chief of Bora Bora, Raiatea and Tahaa, settled at Raʻiātea, leaving local power to the chiefs Ma'i III and Tefa'aora I, originally of Nunue and Anau, and members of the marae of Vaiotaha.

== European contact ==
The first clear mention of the island was by the Dutch explorer Jakob Roggeveen in 1722. James Cook saw it in 1769 and landed there in 1777.

While in Tahiti, the end of the 18th century and the beginning of the 19th century were marked by the missionary and colonial aims of France and England, Bora Bora remained for a long time relatively distant from the power struggles of the two European powers. However, their influence was felt, particularly through the evangelization of the island.

In the 1810s, Chiefs Ma'i III, Tefa'aora I, and 262 warriors joined Pomare II in his fight against the Teva clan. In 1815, the battle of Fe'i Pi at Punaauia (on the island of Tahiti) marked the victory of the Protestant party (Pomare II having converted in 1812) against the traditionalist party. Christianity thus became the religion of the victors, and on their return to Bora Bora in 1816, the warriors shared their knowledge of this new religion with the rest of the population. The success was such that in 1818, the inhabitants asked the missionaries of Moorea and Huahine for books and pastors for the island. Reverend Orsmond came there for the first time the same year, and settled in Bora Bora in 1820.

On May 12, 1820, Tamatoa III, head of Raiatea, put in place a code of missionary obedience of 25 articles inspired by the code of Tahiti (the Pomare code) and providing for the modes of application of justice. The same year, Chief Mai introduced this code of laws to Bora Bora and extended it to Maupiti. In 1822, the Church of Bora-Bora was inaugurated in Vaitape, in the district of Nunue.

At the end of the 1820s, a large part of the population of Bora Bora joined the Mamaia movement. This millennial movement, born on the island of Raiatea, merged old beliefs and new religion and challenges the authority of missionaries. When in 1826, the main leaders of the movement were banished from Raiatea, the heresy spread to all the Leeward Islands, including Bora Bora. The Mamaia sect gained such influence over Tahaa and Bora Bora that in 1831 the two islands joined forces to engage in a war against Raiatea and Huahine, which had remained loyal to the missionaries. Tapoa II, leader of the alliance and Grand Chief of Tahaa was however defeated, and his wife, Pomare IV, Queen of Tahiti, separated from him in 1834. He then settled in Bora Bora as Grand Chief of the island, at the request of the Mai and Tafaaora clans. Tapoa II, however, remained on good terms with Pomare IV, his ex-wife, and in 1845 he adopted one of her daughters, Teriimaevarua, whom he designated as heiress.

When the Kingdom of Tahiti became a French protectorate in 1842, Bora Bora was not concerned, and the island did not suffer the troubles that followed either. However, Bora Bora benefited from the fallout from the Pritchard affair, since, to put an end to the Franco-British quarrel, Louis Philippe ratified the Jarnac Convention of June 19, 1847, which recognized the independence of the Leeward Islands, including Bora Bora. The two great colonial powers undertook not to take possession of these islands, nor even to place them under protectorate. Thus, Tapoa II reigned over an independent island until his death in 1860.

On July 30, 1860, his adopted daughter Teriimaevarua II was crowned Queen of Bora Bora by missionary George Platt. She reigned over the island until her death in 1873. Teriimaevarua having no children, the crown then passed to her niece, Teriimaevarua III, daughter of Tamatoa V, king of Raiatea and granddaughter of Pomare IV. On January 9, 1884, she married Prince Hinoi, also a grandson of Pomare IV.

== The end of independence ==
Under the reign of Teriimaevarua III, the international situation changed. Indeed, the Jarnac Convention, which guaranteed the independence of the Leeward Islands, only committed its two signatories, France and Great Britain. However, from 1878, Germany seemed to take a close interest in the Leeward Islands. In 1879, the Germans tried to forge alliances with Raiatea and Bora Bora. Both islands refused, and Teriimaevarua III informed the French government of the German attempt. For France, this made it urgent to repeal the Jarnac Convention, in order to prevent the installation of a rival power at the gates of its colony, especially since with the expected opening of the Panama Canal, the Society Islands would assume great strategic importance.

To cope with these German attempts, Raiatea and Tahaa also requested the protection of France in 1880. Between 1880 and 1887, these two islands were placed under the provisional protectorate of France. Initially, the chiefs and the Queen of Bora Bora declared themselves ready to accept the French protectorate, subject to a British agreement, but then they showed themselves hostile to a challenge to their independence by France. Meanwhile, France and England were negotiating the repeal of the Jarnac Convention. This was done in October 1887, and with the annexation of the Leeward Islands by France on March 19, 1888, Bora Bora became a French territory. Unlike the inhabitants of the former kingdom of Tahiti, the inhabitants of Bora Bora were not granted French citizenship. Like the other inhabitants of the Leeward Islands, they had the status of French subjects, subject to the régime de l'indigénat.

== Family tree of monarchs ==
Bora Bora family tree

Teri'itaumihau
Teihotu	Rere ao
Puni; Ari'i Rahi of Bora Bora, Ra'iatea and Taha'a	Teri'itemiro
Uru a Tu
Teri'imaevarua I Ari'i Rahi of Bora Bora
Ma'i III; Ari'i of Bora Bora	Tefa'aora I Ari'i of Bora Bora	Tapoa I King of Bora Bora, Ra'iatea and Taha'a	Pōmare Dynasty of Tahiti	Tamatoa Dynasty of Ra'iatea
Ahu'ura	Tefa'aora a Mai; Descendant of Puni
Tehapa'i or Maheanu'u a Mai	Tapoa Vahine alias Tainoa	Tapoa II; King of Bora Bora and Taha'a	Pōmare IV; Queen of Tahiti and Moʻorea	Ari'ifa'aite
Teri'imaevarua II; Queen of Bora Bora	Temauiari'i a Ma'i	Moe a Ma'i	Tamatoa V King of Ra'iatea and Tahaʻa	Teri'itua Tuavira "Prince Joinville"; Ariʻi of Hitiaʻa	Pōmare V King of Tahiti and Moʻorea
Teri'imaevarua III; Queen of Bora Bora	Teriʻihinoiatua Pōmare; Ariʻi of Hitiaʻa

Notes:

Descending dashed lines denote adoptions.

References

- Cadousteau, Mai-Arii (1987). "CHAPITRE VIII: AHU'URA FILLE DU ROI MAI III". Bulletin de la Société des Études Océaniennes. 20 (239–240). Papeete: Société des Études Océaniennes: 45–50. OCLC 9510786.
- Henry, Teuira; Orsmond, John Muggridge (1928). Ancient Tahiti. Vol. 48. Honolulu: Bernice Pauahi Bishop Museum. pp. 247–272. OCLC 3049679.
- Newbury, Colin W.; Darling, Adam J. (December 1967). "Te Hau Pahu Rahi: Pomare II and the Concept of Interisland Government in Eastern Polynesia". The Journal of the Polynesian Society. 76 (4). Wellington: The Polynesian Society: 477–514. JSTOR 20704508. OCLC 6015244633.
- Orsmond, John Muggridge; Smith, S. Percy (March 1893). "The Genealogy of the Pomare Family of Tahiti, from the Papers of the Rev. J. M. Orsmond. With Notes Thereon by S. Percy Smith". The Journal of the Polynesian Society. 2 (1). Wellington: The Polynesian Society: 25–43. JSTOR 20701269. OCLC 5544732839.
- Teissier, Raoul (1978). "Chefs et notables des Établissements Français de l'Océanie au temps du protectorat: 1842–1850". Bulletin de la Société des Études Océaniennes, Issue 202. Papeete: Société des Études Océaniennes. OCLC 9510786.
