= Fenuapeho =

Regent of Taha'a (1773–1831)

- Regent of Taha'a
- Reign: 1812–1831
- Predecessor: Tapoa I
- Successor: Tapoa II
- Born: c. 1773
- Died: April 1831 (aged 58)
- Issue: Teioatua, Taehau a Upaupa (daughter) and others from his four wives.
Names
- Fenuapeho, Upaupa
- Father: Teurahiti
- Mother: Ari'iturua a Tataa

Fenuapeho (c. 1773–1831), also known as Upaupa, was a prominent chief of the island of Taha'a. He served as regent for the young Teri'inohorai, later known as Tapoa II, the grandson of Chief Tapoa I, during a period of significant political and religious transformation in the Society Islands. In April 1831, Fenuapeho undertook a voyage to Bora Bora, but was tragically lost at sea during his return to Taha'a.

== Biography ==
Fenuapeho was about fifty years old and the father of a family with ten fine children from four wives when missionaries Daniel Tyerman and George Bennet met him around 1823. According to ancient genealogies and land claim documents submitted by his heirs, he is recognized as the great-grandson of Pao, sister of Puni, and a descendant of Teri'itaumihau, who is reputed to have been a prominent and powerful chief of Bora Bora.

In the early 1800s, Tapoa I held power over the islands of Ra'iātea and Taha'a, having displaced King Tamatoa III. He also conquered the island of Bora Bora at the end of 1804, which led chiefs Ma'i III and Tefa'aora II to propose that he become king of Bora Bora in order to promote peace. These accounts are consistent with the writings of John Davies, who reported that Tapoa I's daughter Maevarua, who died on July 14, 1809 in Bora Bora from an illness, had been recognized as the principal chief of Bora Bora and Taha'a. She left behind her young son, Teri'inohora'i (later known as Tapoa II), orphaned. In response, Tapoa I appointed Fenuapeho, a member of his family, as regent of his grandson. Tapoa died in Tahiti at the end of November 1812. Tamatoa then regained power over the island of Ra'iātea.

On 3 September 1814, Pōmare II made an unexpected visit to the Leeward Islands after contrary winds diverted the brig Matilda, an Indian vessel commanded by Captain Fowler, from Moorea. During his stay, according to testimonies collected from numerous chiefs in 1845, he adopted Teri'inohorai, the grandson of Tapoa I, gave him the name Pōmare, betrothed him to his daughter Aimata (later Pōmare IV), and declared him the legitimate sovereign of Taha'a, thereby replacing his grandfather. He was about seven years old at that time.

Between the end of 1815 and the beginning of 1816, Tapa, also known as Tamatoa III, the reigning monarch of Ra'iātea, publicly renounced traditional idol worship and professed his faith in Jehovah and Jesus Christ. He dismantled the maraes and burned the sacred idols of 'Oro and Hiro at the Taputapuātea marae. The maro 'ura, or red feather girdle, known by the ceremonial name Tero rai Puatata or Te rai Puatata was considered an evil spirit and was historically linked to numerous deaths. This symbolic and ritual purge marked a decisive rupture with ancestral religious practices and set the stage for broader institutional reform. Subsequently Tamatoa issued a decree abolishing idolatry throughout all his territories and dependencies. In response, adherents of the traditional religion incited Chief Fenuapeho of Taha'a to oppose the decree. They urged him to defend the ancestral altars and deities not only on his native island but also, if necessary, to join the dissenters in Ra'iātea and attempt to seize control of the island in what was framed as a sacred war. Acting swiftly, Fenuapeho and his followers embarked and landed on Ra'iātea before Tamatoa was aware of their arrival. Reinforced by local insurgents, The opponents of Jehovah formed a formidable opposition. Tamatoa withdrew to the location where the missionaries resided and, together with his followers, engaged in prayer, earnestly imploring Jehovah for protection. Following this moment of spiritual preparation, they readied themselves for battle. The enemy forces organized into three divisions, while Tamatoa's group appeared as a small and vulnerable contingent in comparison. The opposing warriors advanced with bravado, discharging their weapons. Tamatoa's party responded with gunfire, and the leading aggressor was immediately struck down. A second warrior fired and was likewise shot, followed by a third who met the same fate. The engagement soon escalated into a general confrontation. However, on the part of the idolaters, it quickly devolved into a disorganized retreat. They were decisively defeated, and Chief Fenuapeho was captured, utterly exhausted from fleeing the battlefield. Remarkably, only two or three individuals from Tamatoa's side sustained injuries. Captured and brought before Tamatoa, Fenuapeho anticipated immediate execution as a rebel, but Tamatoa chose to spare his life. This act of clemency served as a powerful demonstration of Christian principles, prompting the chiefs and people of Taha'a to renounce their gods, whom they now perceived as powerless before Tamatoa's deity. Restored to his small kingdom of Taha'a through the generosity of his conqueror, Fenuapeho did not merely adopt Christianity nominally. From the moment of his conversion, he became a committed and consistent advocate of the gospel. One of the earliest indicators of his sincerity was the establishment of a missionary society among his subjects. Although their number did not exceed eight hundred individuals of all ages, they succeeded in contributing agricultural produce valued annually at seventy pounds sterling.

On 18 December 1822, Fenuapeho accompanied the young Teri'inohora'i to Huahine for his marriage to Aimata, who would become Queen Pōmare IV of Tahiti. This union symbolized a strategic alliance between the royal families of Tahiti and the Leeward Islands, reinforcing inter-island ties and consolidating political influence across the Society Islands. On 21 April 1824, Fenuapeho took part in the coronation of the young King Pomare III. He carried the table upon which the crown was to be placed. Pahi Tiatia, brother of Tamatoa III, carried the coconut oil used to anoint the King. All the governors and district judges were present to assist in the ceremony.

In April 1831, Fenuapeho departed from Taha'a on a voyage to Bora Bora aboard a single canoe and died at sea during his return journey. Following his death, the administration of Taha'a passed to the young Teri'inohorai, also known as Pomare, who subsequently assumed the title Tapoa II. He opposed Tamatoa III and later his son Tamatoa IV. His goal was to reunify Taha'a and Bora Bora, just as in the time of his grandfather Tapoa I. However, he failed in his aspirations for greatness. On April 3, 1832, he was defeated at Vaitoare on the island of Taha'a, suffering heavy losses, and was subsequently exiled to the island of Huahine.
