= List of monarchs of Bora Bora =

Flag of the Kingdom of Bora Bora

Map of the Kingdom of Bora Bora

This is a list of monarchs of Bora Bora.

== Monarchs of Bora Bora ==
| Portrait | Name | Birth–Death | Reign start | Reign end | Notes |
|---|---|---|---|---|---|
| | Tapoa I with Mai and Tefaʻaora | 1772–1812 | 1778 | 1812 | |
| | Mai and Tefaʻaora | | 1812 | 1831 | |
| | Tapoa II | 1806–1860 | 1831 | 1860 | |
| | Teriʻimaevarua II | 1841–1873 | 1860 | 1873 | |
| | Teriʻimaevarua III | 1871–1932 | 1873 | 1888 | Formally abdicated in 1895, seven years after France annexed the Kingdom |

== Family tree of monarchs ==
Bora Bora family tree

Teri'itaumihau
Teihotu | Rere ao
Puni; Ari'i Rahi of Bora Bora, Ra'iatea and Taha'a | Teri'itemiro
Uru a Tu
Teri'imaevarua I Ari'i Rahi of Bora Bora
Ma'i III; Ari'i of Bora Bora | Tefa'aora I Ari'i of Bora Bora | Tapoa I King of Bora Bora, Ra'iatea and Taha'a | Pōmare Dynasty of Tahiti | Tamatoa Dynasty of Ra'iatea
Ahu'ura | Tefa'aora a Mai; Descendant of Puni
Tehapa'i or Maheanu'u a Mai | Tapoa Vahine alias Tainoa | Tapoa II; King of Bora Bora and Taha'a | Pōmare IV; Queen of Tahiti and Moʻorea | Ari'ifa'aite
Teri'imaevarua II; Queen of Bora Bora | Temauiari'i a Ma'i | Moe a Ma'i | Tamatoa V King of Ra'iatea and Tahaʻa | Teri'itua Tuavira "Prince Joinville"; Ariʻi of Hitiaʻa | Pōmare V King of Tahiti and Moʻorea
Teri'imaevarua III; Queen of Bora Bora | Teriʻihinoiatua Pōmare; Ariʻi of Hitiaʻa

Notes:

Descending dashed lines denote adoptions.

References

- Cadousteau, Mai-Arii (1987). "CHAPITRE VIII: AHU'URA FILLE DU ROI MAI III". Bulletin de la Société des Études Océaniennes. 20 (239–240). Papeete: Société des Études Océaniennes: 45–50. OCLC 9510786.
- Henry, Teuira; Orsmond, John Muggridge (1928). Ancient Tahiti. Vol. 48. Honolulu: Bernice Pauahi Bishop Museum. pp. 247–272. OCLC 3049679.
- Newbury, Colin W.; Darling, Adam J. (December 1967). "Te Hau Pahu Rahi: Pomare II and the Concept of Interisland Government in Eastern Polynesia". The Journal of the Polynesian Society. 76 (4). Wellington: The Polynesian Society: 477–514. JSTOR 20704508. OCLC 6015244633.
- Orsmond, John Muggridge; Smith, S. Percy (March 1893). "The Genealogy of the Pomare Family of Tahiti, from the Papers of the Rev. J. M. Orsmond. With Notes Thereon by S. Percy Smith". The Journal of the Polynesian Society. 2 (1). Wellington: The Polynesian Society: 25–43. JSTOR 20701269. OCLC 5544732839.
- Teissier, Raoul (1978). "Chefs et notables des Établissements Français de l'Océanie au temps du protectorat: 1842–1850". Bulletin de la Société des Études Océaniennes, Issue 202. Papeete: Société des Études Océaniennes. OCLC 9510786.

== See also ==
- Kingdom of Bora Bora
- List of monarchs of Huahine
- List of monarchs of Raiatea
- List of monarchs of Tahiti
- List of colonial and departmental heads of French Polynesia
- President of French Polynesia
