= Tapoa II =

- King of Bora Bora and Maupiti
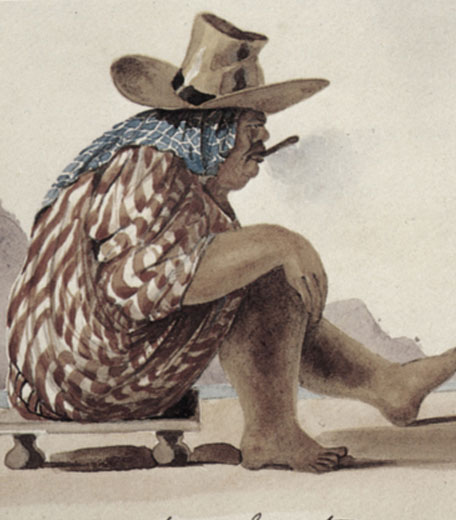
- Painting by Henry Byam Martin, c. 1840s

King of Bora Bora and Maupiti
- Reign: 1832–1860
- Coronation: 30 September 1840
- Predecessor: Ma'i III and Tefa'aora II
- Successor: Teriimaevarua II

Royal consort of Tahiti
- Tenure: 1827–1832
- Born: c. 1806
- Died: 19 May 1860 (aged 53–54); Bora Bora
- Spouse: Pōmare IV; Tapoa Vahine
- Issue: Teriimaevarua II (adoptive)
Names
- Teri'inohora'i, Pōmare, Tapoa II, Teari'imaevarua
- House: House of Tapoa
- Father: Teri'itaria
- Mother: Maevarua

Tapoa II (c. 1806–1860), also known as Teri'inohora'i, Pōmare, or Teari'imaevarua was a prominent figure in the political and dynastic history of the Leeward Islands during the nineteenth century. Through his marriage to Aimata, the future Queen Pōmare IV, he held the title of Royal consort of Tahiti from 1827 until December 1832. He became King of Bora Bora and Maupiti in 1840 and ruled until his death in 1860. His reign illustrates the complex interplay of indigenous leadership, missionary influence, and colonial pressures that shaped the political landscape of the Society Islands during this period.

== Family ==
Teri'inohora'i was born in 1806. His mother was Maevarua and his father was Teri'itaria. Teuira Henry pretended that he was the son of Tapoa I. Nevertheless, other sources clearly identify him as Tapoa I's grandson. He became an orphan in 1809. Davies recorded on 19 May 1809: "A canoe arrived from Raeatɛa with news that Maevarua, Tapoa's daughter, is very ill. This canoe was dispatched to fetch a man who lives in our neighbourhood named Totara. He is a priest and prophet, and supposed to have great power with the gods. He is to go to Raeatɛa to pray for Tapoa's daughter. He has been there lately on a like errand, and she got better, as was thought, by his prayers." Subsequently, on 14 July 1809, he noted: "Three canoes arrived from Raeatɛa; they come here to fetch the chiefs who are to go thither to lament the death of Maevarua, Tapoa's daughter and acknowledged chief of Tahaa and Bora Bora."

As Teri'inohora'i's mother held the rank of ari'i (chieftess) over both Bora Bora and Taha'a, traditional historical accounts and genealogies refer to her as Teari'imavarua or Teri'imaevarua, two variant forms of the same name. She should not be confused with Teri'imaevarua, a daughter of Puni, who in 1792 was reigning over Bora Bora, Maupiti, and Tupai, having lost control of Ra'iātea and Taha'a, according to George Vancouver. She was succeeded in the early 1800s by another Teri'imaevarua, known as Teri'imaevarua I, a great-granddaughter of Puni through her father Teau'e. On 7 November 1846, Henry Byam Martin, in command of HMS Grampus, reported that Tapoa II had succeeded to the sovereignty of Bora Bora partly by right of his mother and partly by the voice of the people.

== Pōmare II's visit to the Leeward Islands ==
On 3 September 1814, Pōmare II made an unplanned visit to the Leeward Islands after adverse winds redirected the brig Mathilda, an Indian vessel commanded by Captain Fowler. He was accompanied by Charles Wilson; George Bicknell, nephew of Henry Bicknell; Samuel Pinder Henry, son of William Henry; Ta'aroaari'i, son of Mahine; and 23 individuals from the Society Islands. Compelled to remain in the Leeward Islands for three months, he visited Taha'a, Ra'iātea, and Huahine, where he was received with the highest honors. According to several testimonies dating from 1845, the chiefs of the Leeward Islands are said to have once again pledged allegiance and "ceded" their lands to Pōmare II, as they had previously done in 1810. During his stay in Taha'a, Pōmare II officially adopted Teri'inohora'i, grandson of Tapoa I, gave him his name Pōmare and betrothed him to his daughter Aimata. Fenuapeho, chief of Taha'a and a member of Tapoa I's family, was appointed regent to Teri'inohorai. Pōmare returned to Mo'orea on December 2, 1814.

== Suzerainty over Taha'a ==
Between late 1815 and early 1816, a coalition of worshippers of indigenous Tahitian deities allied with Fenuapeho in opposition to Tamatoa III and his faction of Pure Atua, or Christian converts. Although Fenuapeho was ultimately defeated, he retained his title as chief of Taha'a under Tamatoa's suzerainty.Tamatoa left the vanquished chief in possession of his lands, assuming control exclusively over the governance, which he exercised until his death.

== Marriage with Aimata ==
Teri'inohora'i married Aimata the future Queen Pōmare IV on 18 December 1822 in Huahine. The marriage was solemnized in the principal place of worship at Apo'otava. The spectacle was remarkably imposing and novel, both to Europeans and to the islanders. The relatives of the bride and groom, the chiefs from Tahiti and Huahine, together with Fenuapeho, king of Taha'a, and Tamatoa III, king of Ra'iātea, attended the ceremony.

== Code of laws Tamatoa ==
On 11 May 1820, under the guidance of English missionaries, the chiefs of the Leeward Islands, united in promulgating a formal legal code entitled E Ture, no Ra'iātea, e no Taha'a, e no Porapora, e no Maupiti, e no te fenua ri'i ato'a i pīha'i iho ("The Laws for Ra'iātea, Taha'a, Bora Bora, Maupiti, and all the small surrounding lands"). Modeled on the 1819 Tahitian code introduced by Pōmare II, this enactment marked a decisive transition from customary oral traditions to codified legislation within the Leeward Islands. Each island became independent, establishing its own government and appointing a chief justice. In the case of Taha‘a, Tamatoa III was appointed guardian of Tapoa I's young son, who was designated to succeed him.

== Succession Dispute in Taha'a ==
Tapoa I's son died in 1824. Following his death, his widow became embroiled in a dispute with Teri'inohora'i, Tapoa I's grandson, concerning the succession to the leadership of the government of Taha'a. On 20 January 1825, the missionary Robert Bourne reported a contest for the governance of Taha'a. The two contenders were Pōmare or Teri'inohora'i, the grandson of Tapoa I, and the widow of Tapoa the biological son of Tapoa I, who had died a few months earlier. Pōmare received the support of the majority of Taha'a's inhabitants, while the widow of Tapoa I's son was backed by the minority on the island, along with all the chiefs and people of Ra'iātea. Charles Barff attested that in 1820, during the promulgation of the first code of law concerning the islands of Ra'iātea, Taha'a, Bora Bora, and Maupiti, Tamatoa III had been appointed guardian of Tapoa I's son who died at a young age. He also added that the latter was the uncle of Pōmare confirming Bourne's writings. John Williams and Robert Bourne made every effort to mediate and resolve the conflict, but their attempts proved unsuccessful. These disruptions exerted a substantial impact on the local economy.

== The Leeward Island War ==
Ra'iātea and Taha'a had been united prior to their conversion to Christianity, under the rule of Tamatoa III, King of Ra'iātea. Around April 1831, Fenuapeho, the chief of Taha'a died, and authority passed to the young Teri'inohora'i, who assumed the title of Tapoa II. Offended by the King of Ra'iātea over a dispute concerning land on Ra'iātea that he claimed as his own, Tapoa II resolved to detach the government of Taha'a from Ra'iātea and transfer it to the chiefs of Bora Bora, to which it had been joined in earlier times. King Tamatoa III strongly opposed to the change of government, but fell ill at the end of May during a military expedition intended to restore the exiled people of Taha'a to their lands. He died in the first half of June 1831, in the presence of the missionary John Williams, his family, and the chiefs of Huahine. He was succeeded by his son Moe'ore, who assumed the title of Tamatoa IV and continued to resist the ambitions of Tapoa II. Moe'ore received support from Mahine, Ma'ihara, Queen Teri'itaria, as well as from the chiefs of Ra'iātea and Huahine, including Teari'ifa'atau and Tera'imano (formerly known as Turaiari'i), the daughter of the late Tenani'a. Tapoa II, by contrast, was supported by the chiefs of Taha'a, several chiefs of Ra'iātea who had betrayed the late Tamatoa III, and by Tefa'aora II, Ma'i III, together with the chiefs of Bora Bora. The conflict quickly escalated into armed clashes, with three battles fought on the island of Taha'a, the last of which resulted in Tapoa II's defeat at Vaitoare on 3 April 1832, where over fifty men were killed. Tapoa II and his partisans were subsequently exiled to Huahine. The entire plot appeared to have been orchestrated by certain leaders of the heretical sect that had arisen some years earlier among the Society Islands. Following the meeting of May 1832, a general peace plan was submitted for the approval of Queen Pōmare IV. The resulting treaty divided the territories: Ra'iātea and Taha'a were entrusted to Tamatoa IV, while Bora Bora and Maupiti, were assigned to Tapoa II. A new code of laws was deemed necessary to govern these islands. Later that year, Queen Pōmare IV distanced herself from her spouse Tapoa II and married her cousin Tenani'a. Celebrated in Mo'orea on 3 December 1832, by missionary Henry Nott, the marriage sparked intense political and social controversy in early 1833.

== Second marriage and Coronation as King of Bora Bora and Maupiti ==
Tapoa II later married Tainoa, who assumed the title Tapoa Vahine. In accordance with the peace agreement reached around mid-1832 among the chiefs regarding the division of the kingdoms of the Leeward Islands, Tapoa was crowned king of Bora Bora and Maupiti on 30 September 1840 under the title Teari‘imaevarua Third (sic), with the consent of Ma'i III and Tefa'aora II.

== Adoption of Pomare IV's daughter ==
In the absence of biological offspring from his unions with Queen Pōmare IV and subsequently Tapoa Vahine, King Tapoa undertook a dynastic adoption to secure succession. At infancy, he and his consort adopted the sole daughter of Queen Pōmare IV, bestowing upon her the name Maevarua and formally designating her as the heir to the throne of Bora Bora.

== The Franco-Tahitian War ==
From mid-July 1844 until 1847, Tamatoa IV, Tapoa II, and Teri'itaria II supported Queen Pōmare IV during the Franco-Tahitian War. During this period, Ma‘i III and Tefaa'ora II challenged the authority of Tapoa by recognizing the flag of the French protectorate and placing themselves under French protection. The conflict ultimately concluded with the adoption of the Jarnac Convention in 1847, a bilateral agreement between France and Britain that recognized the independence of the Leeward Islands.

== Death and succession ==
Tapoa II died on 19 May 1860 in Bora Bora. His adopted daughter succeeded him and was formally crowned as Teriimaevarua II on 3 August 1860, in a ceremony officiated by missionary George Platt. Tapoa Vahine later died of illness on 11 April 1869 in Huahine. Her remains were repatriated to her native island of Bora Bora, accompanied by Queen Teha'apapa II, Ari'imate, and a large delegation from Huahine who paid tribute to her.

== Ancestry ==
Bora Bora family tree

Teri'itaumihau
Teihotu	Rere ao
Puni; Ari'i Rahi of Bora Bora, Ra'iatea and Taha'a	Teri'itemiro
Uru a Tu
Teri'imaevarua I Ari'i Rahi of Bora Bora
Ma'i III; Ari'i of Bora Bora	Tefa'aora I Ari'i of Bora Bora	Tapoa I King of Bora Bora, Ra'iatea and Taha'a	Pōmare Dynasty of Tahiti	Tamatoa Dynasty of Ra'iatea
Ahu'ura	Tefa'aora a Mai; Descendant of Puni
Tehapa'i or Maheanu'u a Mai	Tapoa Vahine alias Tainoa	Tapoa II; King of Bora Bora and Taha'a	Pōmare IV; Queen of Tahiti and Moʻorea	Ari'ifa'aite
Teri'imaevarua II; Queen of Bora Bora	Temauiari'i a Ma'i	Moe a Ma'i	Tamatoa V King of Ra'iatea and Tahaʻa	Teri'itua Tuavira "Prince Joinville"; Ariʻi of Hitiaʻa	Pōmare V King of Tahiti and Moʻorea
Teri'imaevarua III; Queen of Bora Bora	Teriʻihinoiatua Pōmare; Ariʻi of Hitiaʻa

Notes:

Descending dashed lines denote adoptions.

References

- Cadousteau, Mai-Arii (1987). "CHAPITRE VIII: AHU'URA FILLE DU ROI MAI III". Bulletin de la Société des Études Océaniennes. 20 (239–240). Papeete: Société des Études Océaniennes: 45–50. OCLC 9510786.
- Henry, Teuira; Orsmond, John Muggridge (1928). Ancient Tahiti. Vol. 48. Honolulu: Bernice Pauahi Bishop Museum. pp. 247–272. OCLC 3049679.
- Newbury, Colin W.; Darling, Adam J. (December 1967). "Te Hau Pahu Rahi: Pomare II and the Concept of Interisland Government in Eastern Polynesia". The Journal of the Polynesian Society. 76 (4). Wellington: The Polynesian Society: 477–514. JSTOR 20704508. OCLC 6015244633.
- Orsmond, John Muggridge; Smith, S. Percy (March 1893). "The Genealogy of the Pomare Family of Tahiti, from the Papers of the Rev. J. M. Orsmond. With Notes Thereon by S. Percy Smith". The Journal of the Polynesian Society. 2 (1). Wellington: The Polynesian Society: 25–43. JSTOR 20701269. OCLC 5544732839.
- Teissier, Raoul (1978). "Chefs et notables des Établissements Français de l'Océanie au temps du protectorat: 1842–1850". Bulletin de la Société des Études Océaniennes, Issue 202. Papeete: Société des Études Océaniennes. OCLC 9510786.

Ancestors of Tapoa II

16. Tau-niua
8. Mano-tahi
17. Ha'apai-taha'a-vahine of Raiatea
4. Ta'o-ata
9. Te-i'oa-tua
2. Tapoa I of Bora Bora
20. Teri'itemiro
10. Uru-a-tu
21. Tetope
5. Teri'imaevarua I of Bora Bora
11. Tetua-ti'i-roa
1. Tapoa II
6. Pa of Bora Bora
3. Ai-mata of Bora Bora

Regnal titles
Preceded by Tapoa I	King of Bora Bora and Maupiti; 1832–1860	Succeeded by Teriimaevarua II
Preceded by Ma'i III and Tefa'aora II	King of Bora Bora and Maupiti; 1832–1860	Succeeded by Teriimaevarua II
Preceded by Fenuapeho	King of Tahaʻa; 1831–1832	Succeeded by Tamatoa IV
