= Tehaapapa I =

Tehaʻapapa I
- Queen Regent of Huahine and Maiʻao
- Reign: 1760–1790
- Predecessor: Herself as Ariʻi rahi of Huahine and Maiao
- Successor: Teriʻitari'a I as King
- Born: 1735
- Died: 25 July 1810 (aged 75)
- Spouse: Rohianuʻu; Mato
- Issue: Tura'iari'i Ehevahine; Teriʻitari'a I
Names
- Teha'apapa I Fatuʻaraʻi Teriʻitariʻa Teiʻoatua v.
- Father: Teriʻitari'a a Mahine a Ta'aroaari'i
- Mother: Teri’iohua e te anuanua i te tuahu i Uramoae

Tehaʻapapa I (c. 1735–25 July 1810) also called Fatu'araʻi Teri'itariʻa Tei'oatua v. was Queen Regent of the island of Huahine. From her first union with Rohianu'u, she had a son named Teriitaria I born in 1765. Rohianu'u died in 1767, and she became the wife of his brother Mato, by whom she had a daughter, Turaiari'i born in 1769. By another spouse, Tetuaveroa, Mato had two sons: Tenani'a the eldest, and Mahine, born in 1761. Teha'apapa assumed the regency of her son Teri'itaria with the support of Chief Ori, her great-uncle by marriage. He was twelve years old and was the ari'i rahi of Huahine when James Cook met him in 1777. He was still the king in January 1791, according to the information reported to James Morisson by the inhabitants of Huahine while he was in Tahiti. It is clear that he was ousted during that decade by Mahine and Tenani'a, who eventually seized power over the island of Huahine. His fate remains unknown. When English missionaries arrived in Huahine in November 1808, the island was governed by the children of Mato and Turaiari'i Ehevahine. Teri'itaria II, recognized as the supreme chief of Huahine, had been designated to marry King Pōmare II. Her grandmother, Teha'apapa, who held the title of district chief, also served as regent on her behalf until her death on 25 July 1810. Mahine, commander of Huahine's army, wielded influence equal to that of his niece, Teri'itaria. He ceded power to Teri'itaria after the Battle of Feipi in November 1815. He was 60 years old at that time and had decided to withdraw from politics to devote himself to Christianity. However, he was appointed co-regent of the island of Huahine, first alongside Hauti'a and later with Ma'ihara.

== James Cook at Huahine ==
During his stay in Huahine, James Cook reported meeting the supreme chief, or arii rahi, of the island. His name was "Taireetareea" or Teri'itaria. However, he did not mention the name of his mother. He was approximately eight years old in September 1773 when Georg Forster encountered him. In October 1777, James Cook noted that he was no older than twelve and recorded that his father had died in a battle against Puni, the chief of Bora Bora, who had conquered Taha'a and Ra'iātea a few years before his first trip to the Society Islands in 1769. Teri'itaria I was therefore born around 1765. During his minority, Chief Ori assumed the role of his protector and regent. He held the regency until he was compelled to relinquish it in 1777. As acting chief, Ori would also be Teriitaria's uncle. He was described by Georg Forster as an elderly man, likely between fifty and sixty years of age. Given the probable age of Ori, he could not have been Teriitaria's uncle in the traditional sense. The familial and generational gaps would not support the idea that Ori was Teriitaria's uncle, but rather a more distant relative, possibly a great-uncle or someone involved in a regency role due to his familial ties. According to Ma'i, Ori's brother was called Tereroa.

== James Morisson at Tahiti ==
In January 1791, while in Tahiti, James Morisson reported having received information from the inhabitants of Huahine regarding Omai. They informed him that "the Musquetts are in possession of a Chief who was his Friend (Calld Tennanea, brother to Tayreetarieea king of Hooaheine)." It is likely that the person mentioned by Morisson was the ari'i whom James Cook met in 1777, although the relationship with Tenani'a, brother of Mahine, is somewhat erroneous. They were rather cousins according to the writings of the genealogist Mare, although some writings present him as a half-brother. But this is of little importance since his legitimacy as king came from his mother Teha'apapa I. He was still alive in 1891, but it is believed that he had been subsequently ousted by Mahine and Tenania, sons of Mato, during that decade.

== John Turnbull at Huahine and Ra'iātea ==
Captain John Buyers and John Turnbull, British merchants and navigators, arrived in Tahiti on 24 September 1802, and stayed for about a month. Around this time, Iti'a, the mother of Pōmare II, appeared alongside her favorite, a chief from the island of Huahine, a man of most savage appearance and manner. She had been separated from her husband, Pōmare I, for several years. Around October 25, 1802, Turnbull and Buyers landed on Huahine. They was honoured with a visit from the principal lady on the island, who was so corpulent that it was with much difficulty she could be brought onto the deck. This lady exercised sovereignty during the minority of the young king, her grandson. He had no other distinguishing marks from his subjects, except that he seemed to be treated with attention and was carried on men’s shoulders. He had two sisters, about nine or ten years old, and the king was a year or two younger. At Ra'iātea they met King Tamatoa III, whom Turnbull phonetically recorded as "Tomaquoa." His queen, referred to as "Teerimonie," is likely Tūra'iari'i Ehevahine. The father of the king made him a visit. He moreover received a visit from the mother of the queen. Turnbull noted that the chief or king of Taha'a, who generally resides in Ra'iātea, is the commander-in-chief of the inhabitants of both islands in time of war, and seemed to possess much more power and influence in Ra'iātea than the king himself.

== The English missionaries at Huahine ==
On 11 November 1808, English missionaries landed on the island of Huahine due to an insurrection against Pōmare II in Tahiti. The missionary John Davies recounted his stay on the island in his diary. Upon their arrival, they were greeted by Puru and his brother Ari'ipaea whose wife was Iti'a, former wife of King Pōmare I of Tahiti. On 14 November 1808, the missionaries consulted Iti'a and Ari'ipaea in order to offer gifts to the chiefs. They were told that Puru and Teri'itaria should be considered first. The latter was the daughter of Tamatoa III a principal chief of Ra'iātea. She was reckoned as Supreme Chief or ari'i rahi on the island of Huahine and was intended to be the wife of King Pōmare II. Teri'itaria II lived in Huahine with two sisters, a brother and a cousin daughter of Ari'ipaea.

John Davies would later confirm that Puru was called Mahine. He was also called Teheiura. His brother Ari'ipaea was also known as Tenani'a. On 26 May 1809, John Davies reported that Nohora'i son of Tamatoa III, was also called Tinorua. Later writings will confirm that he became Moe'ore, the chief of the district of Atea, on the east coast of the small island of Huahine. He later succeeded his father, who died in June 1831, under the name Tamatoa IV. During the English missionaries' stay in Huahine, a strategic alliance was forged between the Tamatoa and Pōmare dynasties. On 21 November 1808, Iti'a dispatched a message to Tahiti, inviting her son, Pōmare II, to journey to the Leeward Islands and take Teri'itaria II as his wife.

On 28 November 1808, missionary John Davies provided further insights into the reigning family of Huahine. On this occasion, gifts were presented to eight chiefs: Hapapa, Nohorae, Tɛnanea, Turaeare, Tɛmare, Tɛehutu, Taroaare, and Taraemano (Teha'apapa, Nohora'i, Tenani'a, Tura'iari'i, Temari'i, Teihotu, Ta'aroaari'i, Tera'imano). Teha'apapa I, was an old woman of the family of Tamatoa. She called herself the mother of most of the other chefs. Nohora'i was the son of Tamatoa and the brother of Teri'itaria II. Temari'i and Teihotu were his other sisters who also lived in Huahine. He had another sister who lived with his father in Ra'iātea. Tenani'a was a young woman belonging to the same family. Tura'iari'i was Ari'ipaea's daughter from his first wife. Tera'imano, formerly known as Teari'ia'etua, was his daughter by Iti'a. Ta'aroaari'i was the son of Puru.

On 6 July 1818, John Davies recorded that Tura'iari'i, the eldest daughter of Ari'ipaea, had adopted the name Teraimano. Historian Teuira Henry later referred to her as "Turaiari'i Teraimano". The name change honored her younger sister Tera'imano, formerly called Teari'ia'etua, who died around 1811 at the age of 15 or 16. On her maternal side, Teari'ia'etua was the half-sister of Pōmare II.

== Attempt to seize the ship Hope. Death of Teha'apapa I ==
In a letter dated 16 November 1810 to the English missionaries in New South Wales, Pōmare II recounted an attempted seizure of the american ship Hope, under the command of Captain Chase, while it was anchored at Huahine. This plan had been proposed by the chief, Tapoa I, who was present on the island, awaiting favorable winds to sail to Mo'orea in order to support Pomare II. Tapoa suggested that Pōmare Vahine and Teha'apapa I join him in seizing the ship. However, Pōmare Vahine refused to involve the government of Huahine and responded to Tapoa I that if he intended to seize the ship, he should do so at Ra'iātea instead. Tapoa had to abandon the plan and later left Huahine for Eimeo. In his letter, Pōmare II reported that Teha'apapa died on the night of 25 July 1810, shortly after Captain Chase’s departure. The incident was later published by missionary John Davies in The Sydney Gazette on 25 May 1811. He reported that the Chief Tapoa I had proposed the seizure of the ship Hope to the "old queen", who mainly ran the government. She was the "grandmother" of the "true queen", aged around twenty years old. Teha'apapa I was therefore the grandmother of Teri'itaria II.

== Genealogy of the Kings of Ra'iātea by Mare ==
In a document dated July 16, 1849, genealogist Taitete Mare provided details of the descendants of Tehaapapa I, with "v." denoting vahine (female) and "t." denoting tane (male): Ma'ua took to wife Tetuanuimarama, sister of Tereroa and they had Rohianu'u [...]. Rohianu'u took to wife Tei'oatua v. and begat Teri'itaria. Rohianu'u died, and his wife united with Mato, by whom she had Tura'iari'i (Ehevahine), the progenitor of Pōmare on the Huahine side. Mato then took another wife Tetuaveroa by whom he had Tenani'a t. and then Tehei'ura t., this last being the ancestor of Ari'ipeu vahine in huahineTenani'a took to wife Tohemai and begat Tura'iari'i v., that's all. Tenani'a again took to wife Vaira'atoa v., and begat Teri'ia'etua v., that's all. Concerning the decendance of King Tamatoa III, he wrote:Tamatoa took to wife Tura'iari'i and begat Teri'itaria v., then Teritootera'i v., then Temari'i v., then Teri'itinorua t., then Teihotua v.

Temari'i was better known as Ma'ihara. Mare referenced Teritootera'i, the fourth daughter of King Tamatoa III, whose name was absent from the list of his children recorded by missionary John Davies on 28 November 1808. She was the mother of Pōmare II's children. While he did not mention Teha'apapa I by name, he referred to her as Tei'oatua. He also noted the name of Tamatoa III's wife, Tura'iari'i, whom Teuira Henry identifies as Tura'iari'i Ehevahine. She should not be confused with Tura'iari'i, daughter of Tenani'a by his first wife Tohemai, whom Teuira Henry calls Tura'iari'i Tera'imano. Ari'ipeu vahine was known by her death name, Temarii a Taaroarii, daughter of Ta'aroaari'i and Tematafainu'u. She was married to Ari'ipeu a Hiro, also called Paraupapa'a, whose brother Ari'ifa'aite a Hiro was the second spouse of Queen Pōmare IV. Mare further suggested that Tereroa, the brother of Ori, whom Georg Forster and his father Johann Reinhold Forster encountered in May 1774, was the uncle of Rohianu'u and, by extension, the great-uncle of Teri'itaria I. At the time, Ori was between 50 and 60 years old. According to Ma'i's testimony as recorded by James Burney, Tereroa was an arii (chief) of Huahine and the elder brother of Ori. He died in a battle against Puni, the chief of Bora-Bora, who had two wives and three concubines. One of his former spouses was Tereroa's sister, who had died some time earlier.

== Family ==
Huahine family tree

Tamatoa I (or II)
Rofa'i | Ari'ima'o
Tamatoa Dynasty of Raiatea | Mau'a
Rohianu'u | Tehaapapa I Queen of Huahine and Mai'ao | Mato | Tetuaveroa
Teriitaria I King of Huahine and Mai'ao | Tenani'a; King of Huahine and Mai'ao
Pōmare Dynasty of Tahiti | Tamatoa III, King of Raiatea and Taha'a | Tura'iari'i Ehevahine | Mahine Tehei'ura; King of Huahine and Mai'ao | Tao'a
Pōmare II; King of Tahiti | Teriʻitoʻoterai; Teremoemoe | Teriitaria II; Queen of Huahine and Mai'ao | Moeore, Tamatoa IV; King of Raiatea and Taha'a | Ta'aroari'i | Tematafainuu
Pōmare IV; Queen of Tahiti | Pōmare III; King of Tahiti | Tehaapapa II; Queen of Huahine and Mai'ao | Ariimate Teururai; King of Huahine and Mai'ao | Ma'ihara Temari'i
Tamatoa V King of Raiatea | Pōmare V King of Tahiti | Teuhe; Queen of Huahine | Tetuamarama | Marama Teururai; Prince-Regent of Huahine | Tamatoa VI; King of Raiatea and Taha'a
Teriitevaearai a Mai from the Mai family of Bora Bora | Tehaapapa III; Queen of Huahine

Notes:

Descending dotted lines denote adoptions.

References

- Henry, Teuira; Orsmond, John Muggridge (1928). Ancient Tahiti. Vol. 48. Honolulu: Bernice Pauahi Bishop Museum. pp. 247–272. OCLC 3049679.
- Newbury, Colin W.; Darling, Adam J. (December 1967). "Te Hau Pahu Rahi: Pomare II and the Concept of Interisland Government in Eastern Polynesia". The Journal of the Polynesian Society. 76 (4). Wellington: The Polynesian Society: 477–514. JSTOR 20704508. OCLC 6015244633.
- Teissier, Raoul (1978). "Chefs et notables des Établissements Français de l'Océanie au temps du protectorat: 1842–1850". Bulletin de la Société des Études Océaniennes, Issue 202. Papeete: Société des Études Océaniennes. OCLC 9510786.

== See also ==
- Kingdom of Huahine
- List of monarchs of Huahine

== Notes ==
Tehaapapa I Rulers of Huahine Born: 1735 Died: 1810
| Preceded by Herself as Ari'i-rahi | Queen Regent of Huahine; 1760–1790 | Succeeded by Teriʻitari'a I |
