= Teriitaria I =

Teri'itari'a I
- King of Huahine and Maiʻao
- Reign: 1777–1793
- Predecessor: Tehaapapa I as Queen Regent
- Successor: Tenania
- Born: 1765
- Died: 1793 (aged 28)
Names
- Teri'itari'a I
- Father: Rohianu'u
- Mother: Tehaapapa I

Teriʻitariʻa I (c. 1765–1793) was the king of the islands of Huahine and Maia'o at the end of the 18th century. He was encountered by the naturalists Johann Reinhold Forster and his son Georg Forster in 1773 and mentioned by Captain James Cook in 1777. Teriitaria's father died in a battle against Puni, the chief of Bora Bora, and his regency was then assumed by Chief Ori. In 1791, the writings of James Morrison mention Tenania as Teriitaria's brother, which has led to differing interpretations regarding the identities of the individuals cited. The transfer of power from Teriitaria I to Mato's sons, Tenania and Mahine, is believed to have occurred after the Battle of Hooroto in the 1780s, during which Mato and his father-in-law Moohono were killed. The genealogies recorded by Mare and Teuira Henry provide further details on Teriitaria's familial connections to the Tamatoa lineage of Raiatea. Teriitaria I had already faded from memory well before the 1800s. His mother, Tehaapapa I, continued to play an influential role on the island of Huahine, both as a district chief and as regent for her grandchildren from her daughter Turaiarii's marriage to Chief Tamatoa III of Raiatea. She died on July 25, 1810, on her native island of Huahine.

== Encounter with James Cook ==
Teriitaria I was approximately eight years old in September 1773 when The naturalist Johann Reinhold Forster and his son Georg Forster met the young ruler, referring to him as "T’aree-tarea". By October 1777, Captain James Cook noted that he was no older than twelve and recorded that his father had died in a battle against Puni, the chief of Bora Bora, who had conquered Tahaa and Raiatea a few years before his first trip to the Leeward Islands in 1769. Teriitaria I was therefore born around 1765. He was the "Ari'i rahi", or principal chief of Huahine and Maiao. During his minority, the chief Ori assumed the role of his protector and regent. He held the regency until he was compelled to relinquish it in 1777. As acting chief, Ori would also be Teriitaria's uncle. He was described by Georg Forster as an elderly man, likely between fifty and sixty years of age. According to Omai, Ori's brother was named Tereroa. Their deceased sister was one of Puni's wives.

== James Morrison's Writings ==
In January 1791, James Morisson reported receiving information from a resident of Huahine, who stated that the muskets once owned by Omai were now in the possession of a chief, his friend, named Tenania, the brother of Teriitaria, the king of Huahine. Newbury, referencing Mare's genealogy, supports Morrison’s account but notes that Morrison mistakenly believed Tenania to be Teriitaria's brother (sic: cousin). However, the identity of the person Morrison referred to as the "king of Huahine" is open to interpretation. It is possible that Morrison was actually referring to Mahine, Tenania’s brother, since Teriitaria was a chiefly title, not an individual name. Due to the lack of concrete evidence, it is generally accepted—pending new findings—that Teriitaria I ceased to hold the title of Ari'i rahi (principal chief) following the battle of Ho'oroto in Raiatea in the 1780s. Following this, power in Huahine and Maia'o was likely exercised by the sons of Mato: Tenania (also known as Otihe or Ariipaea) and particularly Mahine (also known as Puru or Teheiura).

== Accounts of the Deposition of Teriitaria I ==
The transfer of power from Teriitaria I to Mato's sons, Tenania and Mahine, was described by Chesneau and Marcantoni in 1928. It followed Tehaapapa’s refusal to cede the royalty of the island of Maiao to Moohono's grandsons from the union of his daughter Tetuaveroa with Mato. After Moohono defeated Tehaapapa's forces and dethroned her, he sought to enthrone his grandsons as Ari'i Rahi (Supreme Chiefs) of Huahine and Maiao on the Taputapuatea marae of Raiatea, which was under the control of Chief Puni from Bora Bora. However, Moohono and Mato’s attempt to seize control of the marae led to their defeat and death in the battle of Hooroto in Raiatea circa 1780. After Moohono's death, Fatuarai made five unsuccessful attempts to reclaim the office for her son Teriitaria I. As a result of these struggles power fell into the hands of Mahine and Tenania. Ultimately, Tenania, after marrying Itia in Tahiti, transferred the chieftainship of Huahine and Maiao to his brother Mahine. The fate of the deposed Teriitaria I remains unknown.

There is a version similar to that of Chesneau and Marcantoni that is believed to have been written in 1846 by a resident of Huahine. The author provides a vague timeframe, stating that the battle occurred six seasons after Cook's arrival in Huahine. Missionary John Barff, clarifies this ambiguity, noting that the battle occurred soon after Cook's last voyage. According to the traditional Tahitian calendar described by King Pomare II in 1826, the year was divided into two main seasons based on the position of the Pleiades in the sky: Matari'i i ni‘a ("Pleiades above"), marking a time of abundance and rain, and Matari'i i raro ("Pleiades below"), signaling a time of scarcity and dryness. Six seasons equal three years. Therefore, the battle likely took place around 1780.

Another version of the Battle of Hooroto was recorded by William Ellis in the 1820s, in which Tenania, Mahine, and Mato are mentioned, but the account does not mention the internal wars on the island of Huahine that occurred after Mato's death.

== Mare's writings ==
In a document dated July 16, 1849, Taitete Mare recorded the genealogy of Teriitaria I's family. He wrote that Rohianuu was married to Teioatua v. (where "v." stands for vahine, meaning woman), and together they had Teriitaria I. After Rohianuu's death, his wife remarried his brother Mato, with whom she had Turaiarii v., the ancestor of the Pomare family in Huahine. Mato later married Tetuaveroa, and they had two sons: Tenania and later Teheiura, the ancestor of Ariipeu v. in Huahine. Tenania first married Tohemai, and they had Turaiarii v. Later, he married Vairaatoa v., and they had Teriiaetua v.

Vairaatoa v. was another name for Itia, the mother of Pomare II. Turaiarii v., referred to as Turaiarii Ehevahine by Teuira Henry, was the spouse of King Tamatoa III. Turaiarii, the daughter of Tenania and Itia, is referred to as Turaiarii Teraimano by Teuira Henry. Ariipeu v. was the daughter of Taaroaarii, the son of Puru.

== Teuira Henry's Accounts ==
Historian Teuira Henry, in her 1928 publication, reported that Rohianuu was married to Tehaapapa I Teioatua Teriitaria, and together they had a son Teriitaria I. After Rohianuu's death, his widow became the first wife of Mato, with whom she had Teriitaria t. and later Turaiarii Ehevahine. From his second wife, Tetuaveroa, the daughter of Moohono, Mato had three children: Tenania t.; then Mahine Teheiura t., who became king of Huahine and was fifteen years old when James Cook visited the island in 1777; and finally Rereao v. Teriitaria II was the daughter of Turaiarii Ehevahine and Tamatoa Fao.

== Family ==
Huahine family tree

Tamatoa I (or II)
Rofa'i	Ari'ima'o
Tamatoa Dynasty of Raiatea	Mau'a
Rohianu'u	Tehaapapa I Queen of Huahine and Mai'ao	Mato	Tetuaveroa
Teriitaria I King of Huahine and Mai'ao	Tenani'a; King of Huahine and Mai'ao
Pōmare Dynasty of Tahiti	Tamatoa III, King of Raiatea and Taha'a	Tura'iari'i Ehevahine	Mahine Tehei'ura; King of Huahine and Mai'ao	Tao'a
Pōmare II; King of Tahiti	Teriʻitoʻoterai; Teremoemoe	Teriitaria II; Queen of Huahine and Mai'ao	Moeore, Tamatoa IV; King of Raiatea and Taha'a	Ta'aroari'i	Tematafainuu
Pōmare IV; Queen of Tahiti	Pōmare III; King of Tahiti	Tehaapapa II; Queen of Huahine and Mai'ao	Ariimate Teururai; King of Huahine and Mai'ao	Ma'ihara Temari'i
Tamatoa V King of Raiatea	Pōmare V King of Tahiti	Teuhe; Queen of Huahine	Tetuamarama	Marama Teururai; Prince-Regent of Huahine	Tamatoa VI; King of Raiatea and Taha'a
Teriitevaearai a Mai from the Mai family of Bora Bora	Tehaapapa III; Queen of Huahine

Notes:

Descending dotted lines denote adoptions.

References

- Henry, Teuira; Orsmond, John Muggridge (1928). Ancient Tahiti. Vol. 48. Honolulu: Bernice Pauahi Bishop Museum. pp. 247–272. OCLC 3049679.
- Newbury, Colin W.; Darling, Adam J. (December 1967). "Te Hau Pahu Rahi: Pomare II and the Concept of Interisland Government in Eastern Polynesia". The Journal of the Polynesian Society. 76 (4). Wellington: The Polynesian Society: 477–514. JSTOR 20704508. OCLC 6015244633.
- Teissier, Raoul (1978). "Chefs et notables des Établissements Français de l'Océanie au temps du protectorat: 1842–1850". Bulletin de la Société des Études Océaniennes, Issue 202. Papeete: Société des Études Océaniennes. OCLC 9510786.

== See also ==
- Kingdom of Huahine
- List of monarchs of Huahine

Teriitaria I Rulers of Huahine Born: 1765 Died: 1793
Preceded by Tehaapapa I	King of Huahine; 1777–1793	Succeeded by Tenania
