= Tapoa I =

- King of Taha'a and Bora Bora
- Reign: 1778–1812
- Predecessor: Teriimaevarua I
- Born: c. 1772
- Died: 1812 (aged 39-40)
- Spouse: Ai-mata
- Issue: Tapoa II; Teriʻimaevarua-vahine
Names
- Te-Ariʻi Noho-rai Tapoa I
- House: House of Tapoa
- Father: Taʻo-ata
- Mother: Teriimaevarua I

Tapoa I (c. 1772–1812) was the king of the Tahitian island of Bora Bora from 1778 to 1812.

He had a daughter named Maevarua, recognized as supreme chief or "Arii rahi" of Tahaa and Bora Bora. She died on July 14, 1809 in Raiatea. He was the grandfather of Tapoa II whose mother was Maevarua. Other sources say that he was the father of Tapoa II. After the death of his daughter, the regency of his little son was entrusted to the chief Fenuapeho of Tahaa. With the help of the other chiefs of the Leeward Islands, he provided military support to Pomare II to restore him to his lands at Tahiti in 1810. He died at the end of September 1812 in Tahiti.

== Ancestry ==
Bora Bora family tree

Teri'itaumihau
Teihotu	Rere ao
Puni; Ari'i Rahi of Bora Bora, Ra'iatea and Taha'a	Teri'itemiro
Uru a Tu
Teri'imaevarua I Ari'i Rahi of Bora Bora
Ma'i III; Ari'i of Bora Bora	Tefa'aora I Ari'i of Bora Bora	Tapoa I King of Bora Bora, Ra'iatea and Taha'a	Pōmare Dynasty of Tahiti	Tamatoa Dynasty of Ra'iatea
Ahu'ura	Tefa'aora a Mai; Descendant of Puni
Tehapa'i or Maheanu'u a Mai	Tapoa Vahine alias Tainoa	Tapoa II; King of Bora Bora and Taha'a	Pōmare IV; Queen of Tahiti and Moʻorea	Ari'ifa'aite
Teri'imaevarua II; Queen of Bora Bora	Temauiari'i a Ma'i	Moe a Ma'i	Tamatoa V King of Ra'iatea and Tahaʻa	Teri'itua Tuavira "Prince Joinville"; Ariʻi of Hitiaʻa	Pōmare V King of Tahiti and Moʻorea
Teri'imaevarua III; Queen of Bora Bora	Teriʻihinoiatua Pōmare; Ariʻi of Hitiaʻa

Notes:

Descending dashed lines denote adoptions.

References

- Cadousteau, Mai-Arii (1987). "CHAPITRE VIII: AHU'URA FILLE DU ROI MAI III". Bulletin de la Société des Études Océaniennes. 20 (239–240). Papeete: Société des Études Océaniennes: 45–50. OCLC 9510786.
- Henry, Teuira; Orsmond, John Muggridge (1928). Ancient Tahiti. Vol. 48. Honolulu: Bernice Pauahi Bishop Museum. pp. 247–272. OCLC 3049679.
- Newbury, Colin W.; Darling, Adam J. (December 1967). "Te Hau Pahu Rahi: Pomare II and the Concept of Interisland Government in Eastern Polynesia". The Journal of the Polynesian Society. 76 (4). Wellington: The Polynesian Society: 477–514. JSTOR 20704508. OCLC 6015244633.
- Orsmond, John Muggridge; Smith, S. Percy (March 1893). "The Genealogy of the Pomare Family of Tahiti, from the Papers of the Rev. J. M. Orsmond. With Notes Thereon by S. Percy Smith". The Journal of the Polynesian Society. 2 (1). Wellington: The Polynesian Society: 25–43. JSTOR 20701269. OCLC 5544732839.
- Teissier, Raoul (1978). "Chefs et notables des Établissements Français de l'Océanie au temps du protectorat: 1842–1850". Bulletin de la Société des Études Océaniennes, Issue 202. Papeete: Société des Études Océaniennes. OCLC 9510786.

Ancestors of Tapoa I

8. Tau-niua
4. Mano-tahi
18. Ari'i-rua of Raiatea
9. Ha'apai-taha'a-vahine of Raiatea
19. Tetua-nui-i-tahu-ea
2. Ta'o-ata
5. Te-i'oa-tua
1. Tapoa I
24. Tetua-anua-hia
12. Teri'itemiro
25. Rere-ao
6. Uru-a-tu
13. Tetope
3. Teri'imaevarua I of Bora Bora
7. Tetua-ti'i-roa

Regnal titles
Preceded by Teriimaevarua I	King of Bora Bora; 1778 - 1812	Succeeded by Tapoa II
