= Tamatoa =

Origin
- Origin: Polynesia, Tahiti
- Region of origin: Polynesian, Tahitian

Tamatoa is a name of Polynesian and Tahitian origin.

== Notable people ==
=== Tamatoa Dynasty ===
The Tamatoa Dynasty was a reigning dynasty of the island of Raiatea. Those with the name include:

- Tamatoa II, king of Raiatea and grandfather of Tamatoa III
- Tamatoa III (c. 1757 – 1831), king of Raiatea from 1820 to 1831
- Tamatoa IV (1797–1857), king of Raiatea from 1831 to 1857
- Tamatoa V (1842–1881), king of Raiatea and Taha'a from 1857 to 1871 (born Tamatoa-a-tu Pōmare)
- Tamatoa VI (1853–1905), king of Raiatea and Taha'a from 1885 to 1888
- Teriivaetua Tamatoa (1869–1918), member of the Pōmare Dynasty and daughter of Tamatoa V

=== Other people ===
- Tamatoa Tetauira (born 1996), Tahitian footballer
- Tamatoa Wagemann (born 1980), Tahitian footballer
- John Tamatoa Baker (1852–1921), Hawaiian politician and businessman

== Fictional characters ==
- Tamatoa, a giant coconut crab from the 2016 film Moana
- Tamatoa, King of Bora Bora from the book Hawaii by James A. Michener, 1959

== See also ==
- Ngā Tamatoa, a New Zealand Māori activist group active in the 1970s
