= Teriimaevarua II =

Teriʻimaevarua II
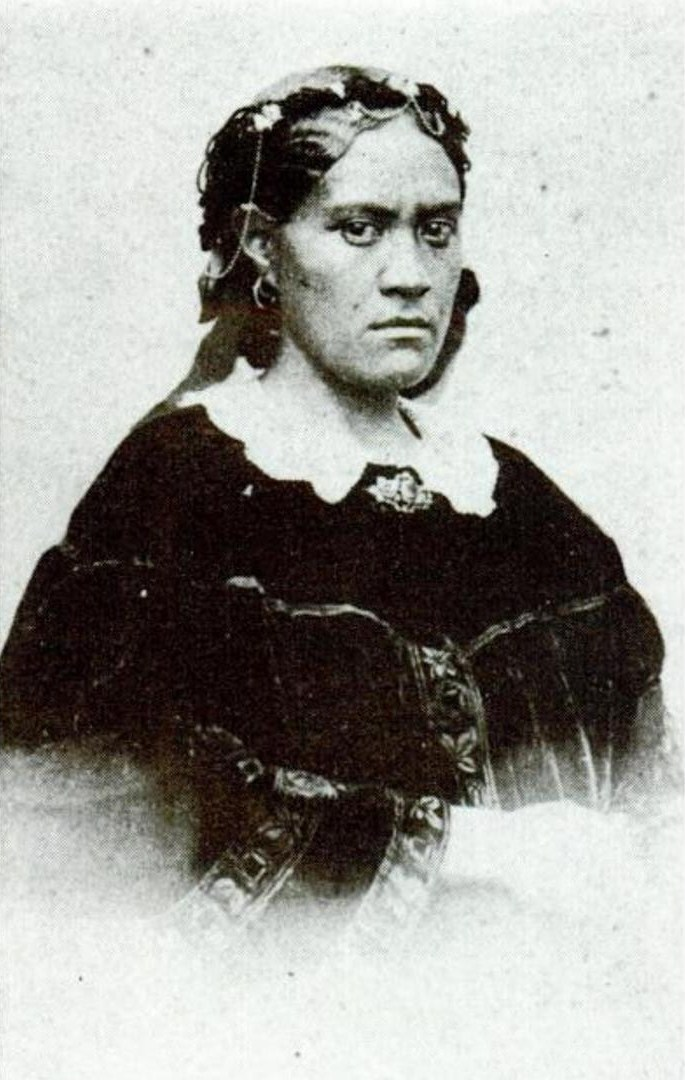

Queen of Bora Bora
- Reign: 3 July, 1860 – 12 February, 1873
- Coronation: 30 July, 1860
- Predecessor: Tapoa II
- Successor: Teriimaevarua III
- Born: May 23, 1841; Kingdom of Raiatea
- Died: February 12, 1873 (aged 31); Kingdom of Bora Bora
- Burial: ? ?
- Spouse: Temauiariʻi a Maʻi (m. 1866)
- Issue: Teriimaevarua III (adoptive)
Names
- Maevarua Pōmare
- House: House of Pōmare
- Father: Ariʻifaʻaite a Hiro
- Mother: Pōmare IV

Teri'imaevarua II (born Princess Maevarua Pōmare; 23 May, 1841 – 12 February, 1873) was the Queen of Bora Bora from 1860 until her death in 1873.

Teri'imaevarua II belonged to the Pōmare dynasty, the royal family of Tahiti, as the daughter of Queen Pōmare IV of Tahiti. Teri'imaevarua was adopted by the childless king of Bora Bora. She received the title of Crown Princess, on the condition she renounce her rights to the Crown of Tahiti.

In 1850, Teri'imaevarua II left Tahiti to join her future kingdom. She succeeded to the throne, following her adoptive father’s death.

Teri'imaevarua II died on 12 February, 1873. She was succeeded by Teriimaevarua III, who reigned from 1873 to 19 March, 1888.

== Tahitian princess ==
Maevarua Pōmare was born on 23 May, 1841 on the island of Raiatea. She was the eldest daughter and fifth child of Queen Pōmare IV of Tahiti and her second husband Prince Consort Ariʻifaʻaite. She was one of ten children, though not all lived to adulthood. Her only sister, Victoria Pōmare-vahine, died at the age of one.

Raised in Papeete with her brothers, she was barely a year old when Admiral Abel Aubert Du Petit-Thouars, commander of the French fleet in Oceania, annexed the Marquesas Islands and declared war on the Kingdom of Tahiti. After the French invaded in 1843, the family fled to Raiatea aboard the Carysfort to escape from the French colonial authorities and the violence of the war. The land had been provided for the family by Queen Pōmare's cousin, the reigning Raiatean King Tamatoa IV. The new lifestyle of the royal family in Opoa were much more impoverished in comparison to life in Papeete, and the family had to reside in a small cottage which was described as "a place little better than a barn."

The French were victorious, but they weren't able to annex the island due to diplomatic pressure from Great Britain, so Tahiti and Mo'orea continued to be ruled under the forcibly imposed French protectorate. A clause to the war settlement was that Queen Pōmare's allies in Huahine, Raiatea, and Bora Bora would be allowed to remain independent.

In 1847, she was six years old when her mother accepted the French protectorate and moved the family back to Tahiti. She ruled the kingdom under French administration until her death in 1877.

== Heiress of Bora Bora ==
In December 1822 Queen Pōmare had married King Tapoa II of Taha'a. The marriage remained childless and ended with the Queen repudiating it on the ground that Tapoa was sterile. On 5 December 1832, Pōmare was married again, this time to her first cousin, Tenaniʻa Ariʻifaʻaite a Hiro, Maevarua’s father. Tapoa II settled in Bora Bora and became king at the request of the Ma'i and Tefa'aora clans. He remained on good terms with his ex-wife.

In 1843, King Tapoa II, having no biological children, asked the Queen of Tahiti, his closest relative, to choose an heir from among her offspring. Privileging her sons for her own succession, Queen Pōmare offered her eldest daughter, Maevarua, as a potential heir to the Kingdom of Bora Bora.

The king accepted and Maevarua Pōmare received, at the age of four, the title of Crown Princess of Bora Bora. Consequently, she was obliged renounce her rights to the throne of Tahiti for herself and her descendants. By the year 1855, she was already known by the name Teari'imaevarua, which bears the same meaning as Teri'imaevarua.

In 1850, she left the island of Tahiti to join her future kingdom. King Tapoa II, took care of completing her education by employing British tutors for the princess.

== Queen of Bora Bora ==
King Tapoa II died on 19 May 1860. Maevarua succeeded him as Queen of Bora Bora. Besides Bora Bora, the kingdom encompassed the islands of Tupai, Maupiti, Maupihaa, Motu One, and Manuae. She ruled under the name Teri'imaevarua II. Her coronation took place on 3 August 1860 at Bora Bora.

On 28 February 1866, she married Prince Temauriari'i, of the Ma'i princely family of Bora Bora. He was seven years her junior. Their union remained childless.

Teri'imaevarua’s next brother, Tamatoa, had, much like herself, been adopted by the childless king of Raiatea, and ruled the kingdom until his deposition in 1871. She adopted his third daughter, Princess Ari'i-ʻOtare Pōmare, as her heir.

== Death and aftermath ==
Teri'imaevarua II died on 12 February, 1873, at the age of thirty-one. Her niece succeeded to the throne, taking the name Teri'i-maeva-rua III. The new queen was still only a child, so Prince Temauriari'i acted as regent until her majority.

Queen Teri'imaevarua III’s reign saw the growing threat of imperialism.

The German Empire’s aims at colonial expansion, particularly in the Pacific, became a serious threat to the interests of the French Republic. This prompted France to declare the Leeward Islands under a provisional protectorate in 1880, in violation of the 1847 Jarnac Convention. In 1888, France and Britain agreed to abrogate their previous treaty and allow the French to annex the Leeward Islands. Royal power remained in effect until Teri'i-maeva-rua III’s abdication in 1895.

Today, the island of Bora Bora is a part of French Polynesia.

== Ancestry ==
Ancestors of Teriimaevarua II

4. Ariʻipeu-a-Hiro
2. Ariʻifaʻaite
20. Vetea-raʻi Uʻuru (= 28)
10. Tamatoa IV (= 14)
21. Opai-pai Te-roro (= 29)
5. Teihotu Taʻavea
22. Mato Teri’i Tepoara’i (= 30)
11. Tu-ra’i-ariʻi E-he-vahine (= 15)
23. Te-ha’apapa I (= 31)
1. Teriʻimaevarua II
24. Teu Tunuieaite Atua
12. Pōmare I
25. Tetupaia-i-Hauiri
6. Pōmare II
26. Teihotu-i-Ahura’i
13. Tetua-nui-reia-i-te-raʻi-atea
27. Vave’a Tetua-nui-rei-a-ite Ra’iatea
3. Pōmare IV
28. Vetea-raʻi Uʻuru (= 20)
14. Tamatoa IV (= 10)
29. Opai-pai Te-roro (= 21)
7. Teri’to’-o-terai Tere-moe-moe
30. Mato Teri’i Tepoara’i (= 22)
15. Tu-ra’i-ariʻi E-he-vahine (= 11)
31. Te-ha’apapa I (= 23)

Regnal titles
| Preceded by Tapoa II | Queen of Bora Bora; 1860–1873 | Succeeded by Teriimaevarua III |
