= Teriimaevarua III =

Queen of Bora Bora from 1873 to 1895

Teriʻimaevarua III
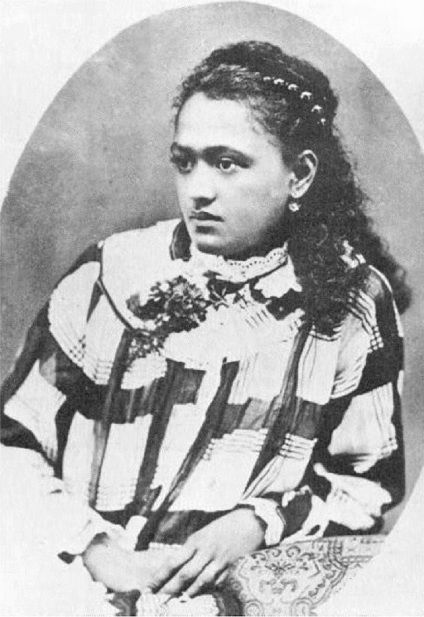

Queen of Bora Bora
- Reign: 12 February 1873 – 21 September 1895
- Predecessor: Teriimaevarua II
- Successor: French Third Republic
- Born: 28 May 1871; Raʻiātea
- Died: 19 November 1932 (aged 61); Papeete, Tahiti
- Spouse: Hinoi Pōmare
- Issue: Rehurehu Tuheiava (adoptive); Itia Tuheiava (adoptive)
Names
- Ariʻi ʻOtare Teriʻimaevarua III
- House: House of Pōmare
- Father: Tamatoa V
- Mother: Moe a Maʻi

Ari'i-ʻOtare Teriʻi-maeva-rua III Pomare (28 May 1871 – 19 November 1932) was the last Queen of the Tahitian Kingdom of Bora Bora from 1873 to 1895.

The second daughter of Prince Tamatoa-a-tu (Tamatoa V), King of Raʻiātea and Tahaʻa and Princess Moe-a-Mai, Ariʻi-ʻOtare became the Queen of Bora Bora on the death of her aunt Princess Teriimaevarua II, Queen of Bora Bora. She married Prince Teri'i Hinoi-a-tua Pomare, chief of Hitia'a in Bora Bora on 9 January 1884 and was divorced in 1887. Ari'i-'Otare produced no children of her own. She adopted her two younger step daughters; Princess Rehu-rehu Tuheiava and Princess Itia Tuheiava. She also adopted and raised her biological nephew Moeterauri "Bimbo" Tetua who was born on 14 September 1916.

Bora Bora was annexed by the French on 17 April 1888, but royal power remained in effect until 1895, when Teriimaevarua III was replaced by a French vice-resident. She remained the head of the royal house of Bora Bora until her death.

== Ancestry ==
Ancestors of Teriimaevarua III

8. Ariʻipeu-a-Hiro
4. Ariʻifaʻaite
9. Teihotu Taʻavea
2. Tamatoa V
10. Pōmare II
5. Pōmare IV
11. Teri’to’-o-terai Tere-moe-moe
1. Teriʻimaevarua III
6. Tehepapai Maheanu’u-a-Mai
3. Moe Maheanu’u-a-Mai

== See also ==
- French Polynesia
- Tamatoa dynasty
- Teururai dynasty
- Annexation of the Leeward Islands
- List of monarchs who lost their thrones in the 19th century

Regnal titles
Preceded by Teriimaevarua II	Queen of Bora Bora; 1873–1895	Succeeded by French Third Republic
