= Pōmare =

Pōmare or Pomare may refer to:

== People ==
=== Tahitians ===
- Pōmare dynasty, the dynasty of the Tahitian monarchs
- Pōmare I (c. 1742–1803), first king of the Kingdom of Tahiti
- Pōmare II (c. 1774–1821), second king of Tahiti
- Pōmare III (1820–1827), third king of Tahiti
- Pōmare IV (1813–1877), queen of Tahiti (fourth monarch)
- Pōmare V (1839–1891), fifth and last king of Tahiti

=== Māoris ===
- Pōmare I (Ngāpuhi) (died 1826), Ngāpuhi leader, also called Whētoi
- Pōmare II (Ngāpuhi) (died 1850), Ngāpuhi leader, nephew of Pōmare I, originally called Whiria, also called Whētoi
- Hāre Pōmare (died 1864), Māori who traveled to England with others and performed songs and dances, son of Pōmare II
- Wiremu Piti Pōmare (died 1851), originally called Pomare and Pomare Ngatata, Ngāti Mutunga leader
- Māui Pōmare (c. 1875–1930), New Zealand Māori doctor and politician

=== Other people ===
- Gyno Pomare (born 1986), Panamanian basketball player

== Places in New Zealand ==
- Pomare, Lower Hutt, a residential neighbourhood of Lower Hutt
- Pomare railway station, situated in the above suburb
- Pomare, Bay of Plenty, a suburb of Rotorua

== See also ==
- Pomar (disambiguation)
- Pomara (disambiguation)
