= Teriitapunui Pōmare =

Teriʻitapunui Pōmare
- Prince royale de Tahiti
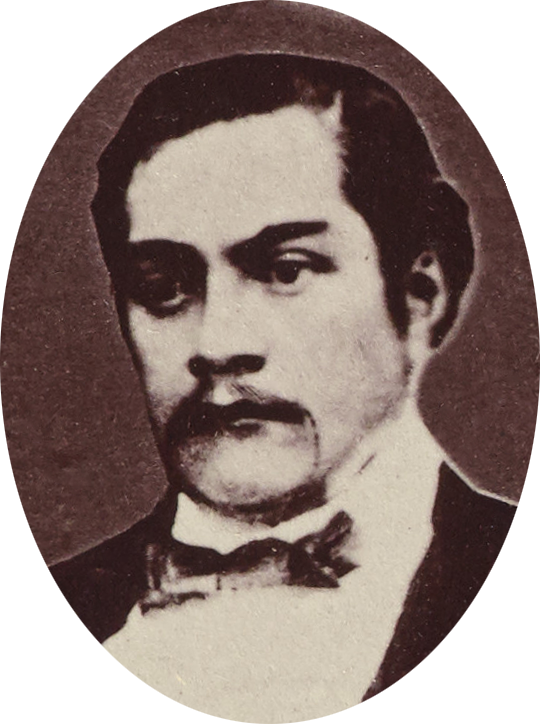
- Born: Punuariʻi Teriʻitapunui Pōmare; March 20, 1846; Raiatea
- Died: September 17, 1888 (aged 42); Papeete
- Spouse: Princess Teriʻinavahoroʻa
- Issue: Princess Teriʻinavahoroʻa Pōmare; Princess Tuaraenuiatera Pōmare
- House: Pōmare
- Father: Ariʻifaʻaite a Hiro
- Mother: Pōmare IV

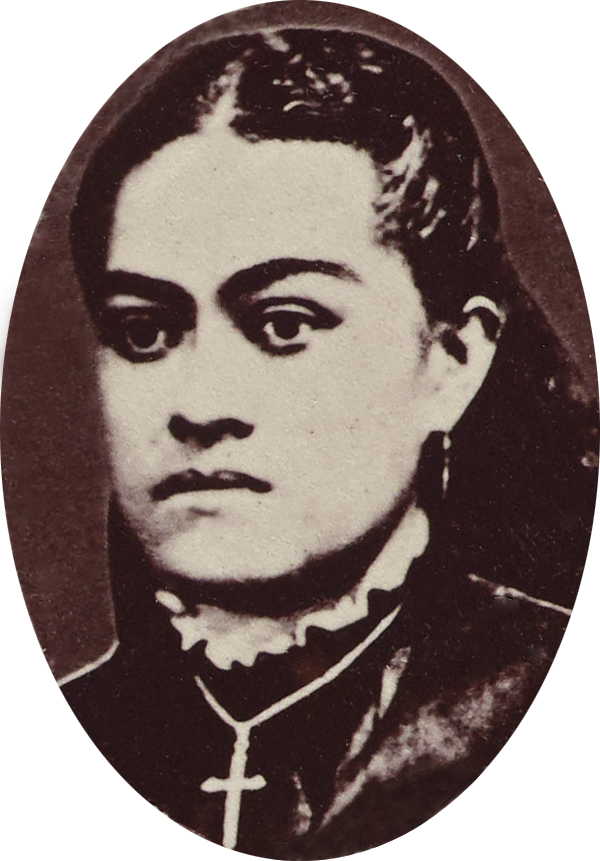
Princess Teriʻinavahoroʻa.

Punuariʻi Teriʻitapunui Pōmare, commonly called Teriʻitapunui (born March 20, 1846 – died in September 17, 1888) was a member of the Pōmare family, a royal dynasty in Tahiti. His first two names translate into Tahitian as "Small-trumpet-above-Prince-of-many-sacrifices."

== Biography ==
He was the fifth son of Pōmare IV, queen of Tahiti, and of her second husband (also first cousin), the prince consort Ariʻifaite a Hiro, a chief from Huahine.

At birth, he was given the title of ariʻirahi (chief) of the district of Afaʻahiti, in Tahiti. Other source state he was given the district of Mahina.

In June 1862, he married the Princess Teriʻinavahoroʻa, from the princely family of Maʻi from Bora-Bora. From this union were born three daughters who both died without issue :

- Princess Teriʻinavahoroʻa Pōmare: born April 15, 1873, died April 12, 1874.
- Princess Tuaraenuiatera Pōmare: born April 13, 1883, died September 5, 1883.

The couple would also adopt his brother Tamatoa V's fourth daughter, whom they named Teriʻinavahoroʻa (1877-1918). She would marry Opuhara Salmon and later his brother Teuraiterai Mote Salmon, having descendants from both husbands.

He was considered by English visitor Constance Gordon-Cumming to "very good fellow, but sadly lame". The main official post held by Teriʻitapunui was that of President of the Tahitian High Court, called Toʻohitu, which had indigenous jurisdiction over property matters. When his brother, King Pōmare V, decided to hand over the kingdom to France, he was among the notables who, June 29, 1880, countersigned the deed of assignment from Tahiti to France.

== Ancestry ==
Pōmare family tree

Ta'aroa Manahune	Tetuaehuri i Taiarapu
Teu; Ariʻi of Pare-Arue; Ariʻi of the Porionuʻu	Tetupaia i Hauiri of the Tamatoa; Dynasty of Raiatea
Teihotu i Ahurai; Ari'i of Moʻorea, Brother of Purea
Terereatua (Auo)	Metua'aro (Mahau); Ariʻi of Mo'orea and Vaiari	Itia	Pōmare I King of Tahiti and Moʻorea	Paiti; Ariʻi of Hapaiano
Tetuanui Tarovahine; Wife of Pōmare II	Teri'itaria Ari'ipaea; Queen of Huahine and Maʻiao	Pōmare II; King of Tahiti and Moʻorea	Teri'ito'oterai Teremoemoe	Teri'inavahoroa Vahine	Teri'inavahoroa Tane, Vehiatua; Ariʻi of Taiarapu	Terano Vahine
Pōmare III; King of Tahiti and Moʻorea	Teinaiti	Ari'ifa'aite	Pōmare IV; Queen of Tahiti and Moʻorea	Tapoa II; King of Bora Bora of the Tapoa; Dynasty of Bora Bora
Teuhe; Queen of Huahine of the Teurura'i; Dynasty of Huahine	Pōmare V King of Tahiti and Moʻorea	Marau	Ari'iaue	Teri'itua Tuavira "Prince Joinville"; Ariʻi of Hitiaʻa	Isabelle Vahinetua Shaw	Tamatoa V King of Raiatea and Tahaʻa	Moe a Mai	Teri'imaevarua II; Queen of Bora Bora	Temauiari'i a Mai	Teri'itapunui Punuari'i; Ariʻi of Mahina	Teri'inavahoroa a Mai
Teriʻihinoiatua Pōmare; Ariʻi of Hitiaʻa	Teri'imaevarua III; Queen of Bora Bora

Notes:

Descending dotted lines denote adoptions.

References

- Henry, Teuira; Orsmond, John Muggridge (1928). Ancient Tahiti. Vol. 48. Honolulu: Bernice Pauahi Bishop Museum. pp. 247–272. OCLC 3049679.
- Newbury, Colin W.; Darling, Adam J. (December 1967). "Te Hau Pahu Rahi: Pomare II and the Concept of Interisland Government in Eastern Polynesia". The Journal of the Polynesian Society. 76 (4). Wellington: The Polynesian Society: 477–514. JSTOR 20704508. OCLC 6015244633.
- Orsmond, John Muggridge; Smith, S. Percy (March 1893). "The Genealogy of the Pomare Family of Tahiti, from the Papers of the Rev. J. M. Orsmond. With Notes Thereon by S. Percy Smith". The Journal of the Polynesian Society. 2 (1). Wellington: The Polynesian Society: 25–43. JSTOR 20701269. OCLC 5544732839.
- Pomare, Tamatoa Brander; Pomare, Pomateao Salmon (15 August 1938). "The Pomares of Tahiti – Letter to the Editor". Pacific Islands Monthly. Vol. IX, no. 1. Sydney: Pacific Publications. p. 34. OCLC 780465500.
- Teissier, Raoul (1978). "Chefs et notables des Établissements Français de l'Océanie au temps du protectorat: 1842–1850". Bulletin de la Société des Études Océaniennes, Issue 202. Papeete: Société des Études Océaniennes. OCLC 9510786.

Ancestors of Teriitapunui Pōmare

4. Ariʻipeu-a-Hiro
2. Ariʻifaʻaite
10. Tamatoa IV (= 14)
5. Teihotu Taʻavea
11. Tu-ra’i-ariʻi E-he-vahine (= 15)
1. Teriʻitapunui Pōmare
12. Pōmare I
6. Pōmare II
13. Tetua-nui-reia-i-te-raʻi-atea
3. Pōmare IV
14. Tamatoa IV (= 10)
7. Teri’to’-o-terai Tere-moe-moe
15. Tu-ra’i-ariʻi E-he-vahine (= 11)

== See also ==
- List of monarchs of Tahiti
- French Polynesia

== Bibliography ==
- Pritchard, George (1983). The Aggressions of the French at Tahiti: And Other Islands in the Pacific. Oxford University Press.
