= Teriivaetua =

Princess Teriivaetua
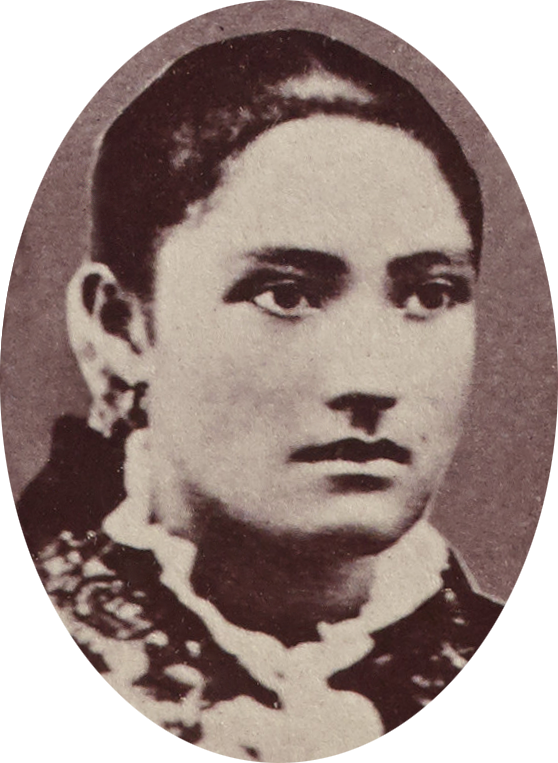
- Born: September 22, 1869; Papeete, Tahiti
- Died: December 4, 1918 (aged 49); Papeete, Tahiti, French Polynesia
- Burial: Pōmare Royal Cemetery, Papa'oa, Arue
- Spouse: Norman Brander (m. 1884)
- Issue: John Teri'irereiahurai Teri'inui Brander; Tamatoa Tepauari'i Brander; Norman Winifield Tamatoa Te-vahi-tua-i-Pa-tea Brander; Josephine Brander
- House: House of Pōmare
- Father: Tamatoa V
- Mother: Moe a Mai

Teriʻivaetua (September 22, 1869–December 4, 1918) was a member of the Pōmare Dynasty and the heiress apparent when the Kingdom of Tahiti was annexed by France in 1880. Her name Teri'i-vae-tua means Sovereign-distributing-the-ocean in Tahitian.

== Life ==
Born September 22, 1869, at Papeete, Princess Teriivaetua was the second daughter of Tamatoa V and Moe-a-Mai. Her father was the second surviving son of the reigning Queen Pōmare IV and had served as the king of the neighboring islands of Raiatea and Tahaa before being deposed by the natives because of his cruel rule. Her mother was the daughter Maheanuu a Mai and Teriitaumaiterai and thus related to the chiefly Mai family of Bora Bora and the Teva clan of southern Tahiti. Princess Teriivaetua had an older sister name Teriiourumaona, who had been given the name Pōmare VI by their grandmother in hope that she would one day be queen after their childless uncle Pōmare V. She also had a younger brother named Tamatoa that died young and three younger sisters: Teriimaevarua III, who would succeed their aunt on the throne of Bora Bora, Princess Teriʻinavahoroa, and Princess ʻAimata.

After her elder sister's death, Teriivaetua took her older sister Teriiourumaona's place in the succession directly after her uncle, the then Crown Prince Ari'iaue, and before her cousin Prince Hinoi, the only son of Queen Pōmare IV's youngest son Prince Joinvile. The line of succession was thus established in the year her grandmother died. Following the wishes of the dead queen, it was decided that she and her cousin would take precedence over any children born to her uncle, the newly crowned King Pōmare V and his part-English wife Queen Marau in order to secure a pure-Tahitian heir to the throne. The decision was ratified by the Legislative Assembly of Tahiti and the French Admiral Paul Serre. Because of her status as the future Queen of Tahiti, she was sent to the island of Moorea to be raised by the Protestant mission in the house of pastor Prosper Brun. These events became obsolete after the end of the Tahitian monarchy. On June 29, 1880, her uncle King Pōmare V gave Tahiti and its dependencies to France, whereupon he and the entire royal family were given pensions by the French government. The young princess Teriivaetua and her younger sister Princess Teriʻinavaroa both received an annual pension of twelve-thousand francs from the French government in the annexation treaty.

== Marriage and children ==
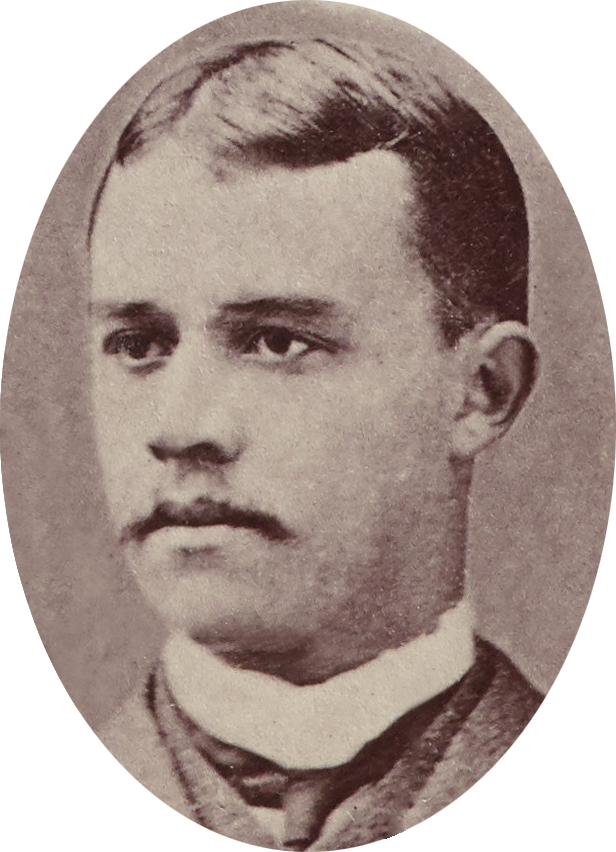
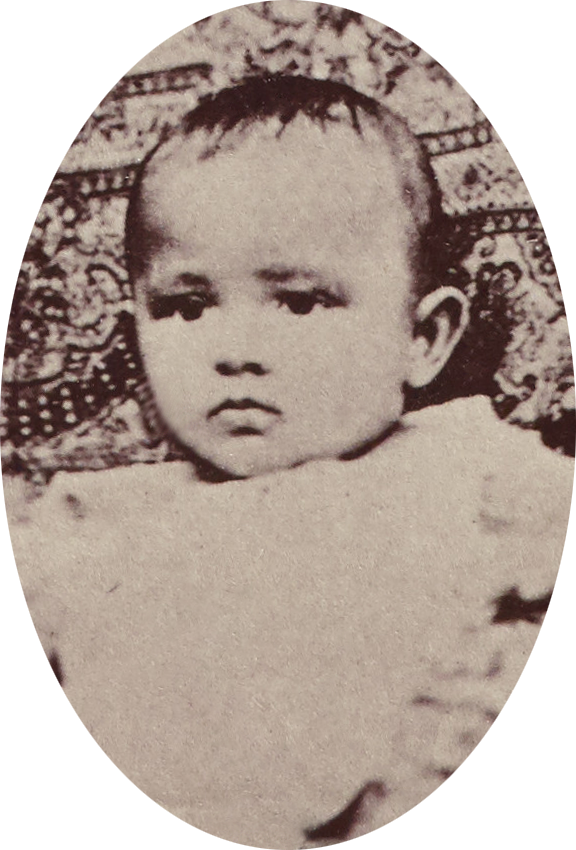
Norman Brander (1864–1930) and John Teri'irereiahurai Teri'inui Brander (1885–1918)

On April 29, 1884, Teriivaetua married Norman Brander (1864–1930), the part-Scottish nephew of Queen Marau at Papeete. The couple divorced on January 21, 1893, after Princess Teriivaetua discovered her husband was having an affair with his aunt Manihinihi "Pri" Salmon (1866–1918). The marriage produced four children:

- John Teri'irereiahurai Teri'inui Brander (July 7, 1885 – December 6, 1918), married Tetuari'i Topa Teura Brander and had issue.
- Tamatoa Tepauari'i Brander (December 26, 1887 – August 6, 1888), died young.
- Norman Winifield Tamatoa Te-vahi-tua-i-Pa-tea Brander (March 23, 1889 – November, 1966), married his cousin Teri’i Temaeva-rau and had issue.
- Josephine Brander, who probably married her cousin Ernest Salmon, the illegitimate son of Queen Marau and a French officer.

== Death ==
Princess Teriivaetua never remarried and died at Papeete on December 4, 1918, during the height of the influenza epidemic which had spread from Europe. She was laid to rest in the Pōmare Royal Cemetery in Arue.

== Ancestry ==
Ancestors of Teriivaetua

8. Ariʻipeu-a-Hiro
4. Ariʻifaʻaite
18. Tamatoa IV (= 22)
9. Teihotu Taʻavea
19. Tu-ra’i-ariʻi E-he-vahine (= 23)
2. Tamatoa V
20. Pomare I
10. Pōmare II
21. Tetua-nui-reia-i-te-raʻi-atea
5. Pōmare IV
22. Tamatoa IV (= 18)
11. Teri’to’-o-terai Tere-moe-moe
23. Tu-ra’i-ariʻi E-he-vahine (= 19)
1. Teriʻivaetua
6. Tehepapai Maheanu’u-a-Mai
3. Moe Maheanu’u-a-Mai

== Bibliography ==
- Gardey, P. (1897). Anglophilie gouvernementale, manoeuvres des protestants à Tahiti et à Madagascar (in French). Paris: Chamuel.
- Gordon-Cumming, Constance (1882). A Lady's Cruise in a French Man-of-War. William Blackwood and Sons.
- Henry, Teuira; Orsmond, John Muggridge (1928). Ancient Tahiti. Vol. 48. Bernice Pauahi Bishop Museum.
- France (1881). "Deuxième déclaration du commissaire de la République, donnée à Papeete, le 29 juin 1880". In Clercq, Jules de; Clercq, Jehan Henry (eds.). Recueil des traités de la France. Vol. 12. pp. 572–573.
