= List of monarchs of Tahiti =

Flag of the Kingdom of Tahiti

Map of the Kingdom of Tahiti

This is a list of monarchs of Tahiti. They ruled over the Kingdom of Tahiti, and all of them belonged to the Pōmare dynasty. They carried the title Ari'i rahi.

== Monarchs of Tahiti ==
Name	Lifespan	Reign start	Reign end	Notes	Family	Image
Pōmare I: Vai raʻa toa Taina Pōmare I	c. 1753 – 3 September 1803 (aged c. 49–50)	1788	3 September 1803	De facto paramount ruler from 1768, first as ariʻi, then as regent for Pōmare II from his birth.	Pōmare	Pōmare I of Tahiti
Pōmare II: Tū Tū-nui-ʻēʻa-i-te-atua Pōmare II	c. 1782 – 7 December 1821 (aged c. 38–39)	3 September 1803	7 December 1821	Son of Pōmare I. Succeeded Pōmare I at birth as ari'i. Exiled to Mo'orea on 22 December 1808. Reclaimed throne on 15 November 1815 after the Battle of Te Feipī.	Pōmare	Pōmare II of Tahiti
Pōmare III: Teriʻi tariʻa Pōmare III	25 June 1820 – 8 January 1827 (aged 6)	7 December 1821	8 January 1827	Son of Pōmare II.	Pōmare	Pōmare III of Tahiti
Council of Regency		7 December 1821	8 January 1827	Regents for Pōmare III (per Pōmare II's request): Queen Teriʻitoʻoterai Tere-moe-moe; Queen Teriʻitaria Ariʻipaea Vahine; Five of the principal chiefs of Tahiti		Council of Regency of Tahiti
Pōmare IV: ʻAimata Pōmare IV Vahine	28 February 1813 – 17 September 1877 (aged 64)	11 January 1827	17 September 1877	Daughter of Pōmare II. Longest reigning ruler of Tahiti, ruled under French protectorate from 9 September 1842.	Pōmare	Pōmare IV of Tahiti
Pōmare V: Ariʻi aue Pōmare V	3 November 1839 – 12 June 1891 (aged 51)	17 September 1877	30 December 1880	Son of Pōmare IV. Last King of Tahiti, France annexed Tahiti and its dependencies on 29 June 1880.	Pōmare	Pōmare V of Tahiti

== Family tree ==
Pōmare family tree

Ta'aroa Manahune	Tetuaehuri i Taiarapu
Teu; Ariʻi of Pare-Arue; Ariʻi of the Porionuʻu	Tetupaia i Hauiri of the Tamatoa; Dynasty of Raiatea
Teihotu i Ahurai; Ari'i of Moʻorea, Brother of Purea
Terereatua (Auo)	Metua'aro (Mahau); Ariʻi of Mo'orea and Vaiari	Itia	Pōmare I King of Tahiti and Moʻorea	Paiti; Ariʻi of Hapaiano
Tetuanui Tarovahine; Wife of Pōmare II	Teri'itaria Ari'ipaea; Queen of Huahine and Maʻiao	Pōmare II; King of Tahiti and Moʻorea	Teri'ito'oterai Teremoemoe	Teri'inavahoroa Vahine	Teri'inavahoroa Tane, Vehiatua; Ariʻi of Taiarapu	Terano Vahine
Pōmare III; King of Tahiti and Moʻorea	Teinaiti	Ari'ifa'aite	Pōmare IV; Queen of Tahiti and Moʻorea	Tapoa II; King of Bora Bora of the Tapoa; Dynasty of Bora Bora
Teuhe; Queen of Huahine of the Teurura'i; Dynasty of Huahine	Pōmare V King of Tahiti and Moʻorea	Marau	Ari'iaue	Teri'itua Tuavira "Prince Joinville"; Ariʻi of Hitiaʻa	Isabelle Vahinetua Shaw	Tamatoa V King of Raiatea and Tahaʻa	Moe a Mai	Teri'imaevarua II; Queen of Bora Bora	Temauiari'i a Mai	Teri'itapunui Punuari'i; Ariʻi of Mahina	Teri'inavahoroa a Mai
Teriʻihinoiatua Pōmare; Ariʻi of Hitiaʻa	Teri'imaevarua III; Queen of Bora Bora

Notes:

Descending dotted lines denote adoptions.

References

- Henry, Teuira; Orsmond, John Muggridge (1928). Ancient Tahiti. Vol. 48. Honolulu: Bernice Pauahi Bishop Museum. pp. 247–272. OCLC 3049679.
- Newbury, Colin W.; Darling, Adam J. (December 1967). "Te Hau Pahu Rahi: Pomare II and the Concept of Interisland Government in Eastern Polynesia". The Journal of the Polynesian Society. 76 (4). Wellington: The Polynesian Society: 477–514. JSTOR 20704508. OCLC 6015244633.
- Orsmond, John Muggridge; Smith, S. Percy (March 1893). "The Genealogy of the Pomare Family of Tahiti, from the Papers of the Rev. J. M. Orsmond. With Notes Thereon by S. Percy Smith". The Journal of the Polynesian Society. 2 (1). Wellington: The Polynesian Society: 25–43. JSTOR 20701269. OCLC 5544732839.
- Pomare, Tamatoa Brander; Pomare, Pomateao Salmon (15 August 1938). "The Pomares of Tahiti – Letter to the Editor". Pacific Islands Monthly. Vol. IX, no. 1. Sydney: Pacific Publications. p. 34. OCLC 780465500.
- Teissier, Raoul (1978). "Chefs et notables des Établissements Français de l'Océanie au temps du protectorat: 1842–1850". Bulletin de la Société des Études Océaniennes, Issue 202. Papeete: Société des Études Océaniennes. OCLC 9510786.

== Current status ==
In 2006, Tauatomo Mairau claimed to be the heir to the Tahitian throne, and attempted to re-assert the status of the monarchy in court. His claims were not recognized by France. On 28 May 2009, Joinville Pōmare, an adopted member of the Pōmare family, declared himself King Pōmare XI, during a ceremony attended by descendants of leading chiefs but spurned by members of his own family. Other members of the family recognised his uncle, Léopold Pōmare, as heir to the throne.

He attempted to have royal trust lands returned to him and his family. The French government mortgaged the land after World War II, and in doing so violated the terms of the agreement signed with Pōmare V in 1880 which reserved control of the trust lands for the royal family of Tahiti. The banks may be in the process of freezing the assets, and Mairau sued to prevent native Tahitians from being evicted from his trust lands, and wished for them to retain their usage rights over the land.

== See also ==
- Kingdom of Tahiti
- List of royal consorts of Tahiti
- List of monarchs of Huahine
- List of monarchs of Raiatea
- List of monarchs of Bora Bora
- List of colonial and departmental heads of French Polynesia
- President of French Polynesia
