= List of royal consorts of Tahiti =

A royal consort is a spouse of a monarch. The Kingdom of Tahiti was founded by Pōmare I (known as Tu) between 1788 and 1791. His dynasty lasted until his great-grandson Pōmare V abdicated in 1880 and the French annexed Tahiti and its dependencies to form French Polynesia.

== Pōmare Dynasty ==
Portrait	Name	Birth	Death	Consort to
	Tetuanuireiaiteraʻiatea (Itia)	1764	16 January 1814	Pōmare I (r. 1788–1791, de jure) (r. 1788–1803, de facto)
	Tetuanui Tarovahine (Tetua)	1782	21 July 1806	Pōmare II (r. 1791–1821)
	Teriʻitaria II	1790	1858	Pōmare II (r. 1791–1821)
	Teriʻitoʻoterai Teremoemoe	1793	After 1867	Pōmare II (r. 1791–1821)
	Tapoa II	1806	March 1860	Pōmare IV (r. 1827–1877)
	Tenaniʻa Ariʻifaʻaite	10 January 1820	6 August 1873	Pōmare IV (r. 1827–1877)
	Johanna Marau Taʻaroa	24 April 1860	4 February 1935	Pōmare V (r. 1877–1880)

== Bibliography ==
- Henry, Teuira; Orsmond, John Muggridge (1928). Ancient Tahiti. Vol. 48. Honolulu: Bernice Pauahi Bishop Museum. OCLC 3049679.
- Newbury, Colin Walter (1980). Tahiti Nui: Change and Survival in French Polynesia, 1767–1945 (PDF). Honolulu: University Press of Hawaii. hdl:10125/62908. ISBN 978-0-8248-8032-3. OCLC 1053883377.
- Teissier, Raoul (1978). "Chefs et notables des Établissements Français de l'Océanie au temps du protectorat: 1842–1850". Bulletin de la Société des Études Océaniennes (202). Papeete: Société des Études Océaniennes. OCLC 9510786.
