= Pomar =

Pomar may refer to:

- Pomar (surname), a surname

== Places ==
- Medina de Pomar, a municipality in Burgos, Castile and León, Spain
- Picó Pomar Residence, an 1840 Spanish Neoclassical building
- Pomar de Valdivia, a municipality in Palencia, Castile and León, Spain

== Others ==
- Bodegas Pomar, C.A., a Venezuela wine maker
- El Pomar Foundation, Colorado, U.S.
- UD Pomar, a football team based in Pomar de Cinca, Aragón, Spain

== See also ==
- Pomara (disambiguation)
- Pomare (disambiguation)
