= Pomar (surname) =

Pomar is a surname. Notable people with the surname include:

- Arturo Pomar (1931–2016), Spanish chess Grandmaster
- Bernat Pomar (1932–2011), Mallorcan composer and violinist
- Emília Pomar de Sousa Machado (1857–1944), Portuguese writer and poet
- Júlio Pomar (born 1926), Portuguese painter
- Juan Bautista Pomar (1535–1590), historian and writer on pre-Columbian Aztec history
- María Teresa Pomar (1919–2010), Mexican art historian
- Mario Pomar (1920–1987), Argentine singer
- Wladimir Pomar (1936–2023), Brazilian writer

== See also ==
- Pomar (disambiguation)
