= Pōmare dynasty =

Tahitian royal house

Pōmare
- Parent house: Tamatoa dynasty
- Country: Tahiti, Raiatea, Bora Bora
- Founded: 1788
- Founder: Pōmare I
- Current head: disputed
- Final ruler: Teriimaevarua III
- Titles: King of Tahiti and Mo'orea; King of Bora Bora; King of Raiatea and Taha'a; Ari'i Rahi of Hitia'a; Ari'i Rahi of Afa'ahiti; Ari'i Rahi of Porionu'u
- Dissolution: 1880

The Pōmare dynasty was the reigning family of the Kingdom of Tahiti between the unification of the islands by Pōmare I in 1788 and Pōmare V's cession of the kingdom to France in 1880. Their influence once spanned most of the Society Islands, the Austral Islands and the Tuamotu Archipelago.

The scientific name Pomarea of the Polynesian monarch flycatchers was established in honour of this dynasty. It was first used for the species from Tahiti by René Lesson and Prosper Garnot, and subsequently for the entire genus.

== History ==
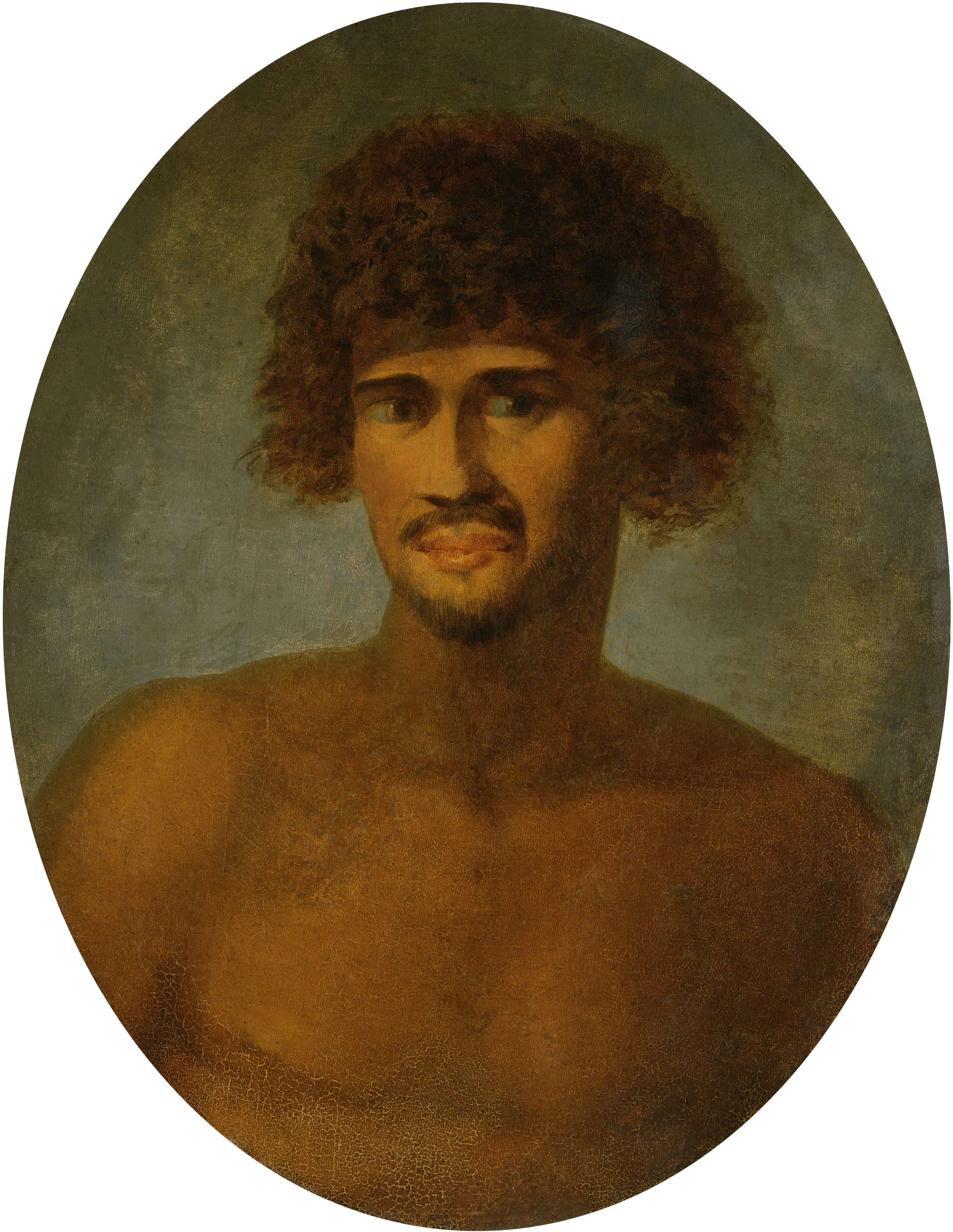
Pōmare I established his dynasty upon unifying the districts of Tahiti to become the Kingdom of Tahiti.

The ancestors of the family ultimately descended from an individual named Tu from the island of Fakarava in the Tuamotus who was adopted as heir by Mauaihiti, Ari'i of Pare. Settling in Tahiti, the dynasty became the district chieftains or ari'i rahi of Porionuʻu (including the smaller districts of Pare and Arue) and intermarried with the Tamatoa family from the island of Raiatea. With foreign weapons, chief Tu gradually took over control of the other parts of the island of Tahiti, and then brought the islands of Moorea, Mehetia, and Tetiaroa into a single entity.

Chief Tu later adopted the name Pōmare. Pō-mare means 'night cougher', a nickname he took, as was common in that time, in honor of his daughter Teriinavahoroa who died from tuberculosis in 1792.

Through subsequent inheritance, adoptions, and marriage alliances, the dynasty at its peak included all the Society Islands with a member of the family ruling in Tahiti, Raiatea and Bora Bora. Tahiti also controlled some of the outlying islands of the Austral Islands and the Tuamotu Archipelago.

Tahiti and its dependencies were made a French protectorate in 1842, and largely annexed as a colony of France in 1880. The monarchy was abolished by France and Tahiti annexed in 1880. The last reigning monarch of the dynasty was Teriimaevarua III, Queen of Bora Bora, who abdicated in 1895. There are still pretenders and many Tahitians still wish for a return of the monarchy, some of whom claim that the act of abolishing the monarchy was either outright illegal, or outside of certain jurisdictions.

== Pōmare Monarchs ==
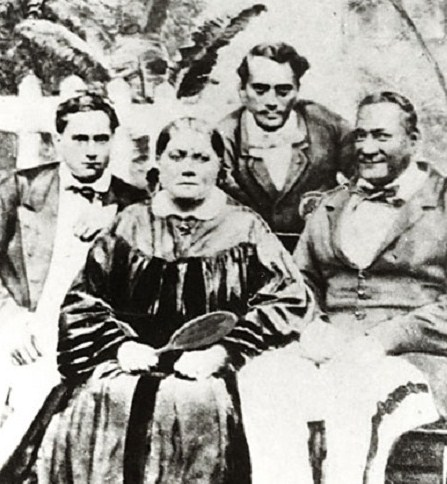
Royal Family of Tahiti, 1864.

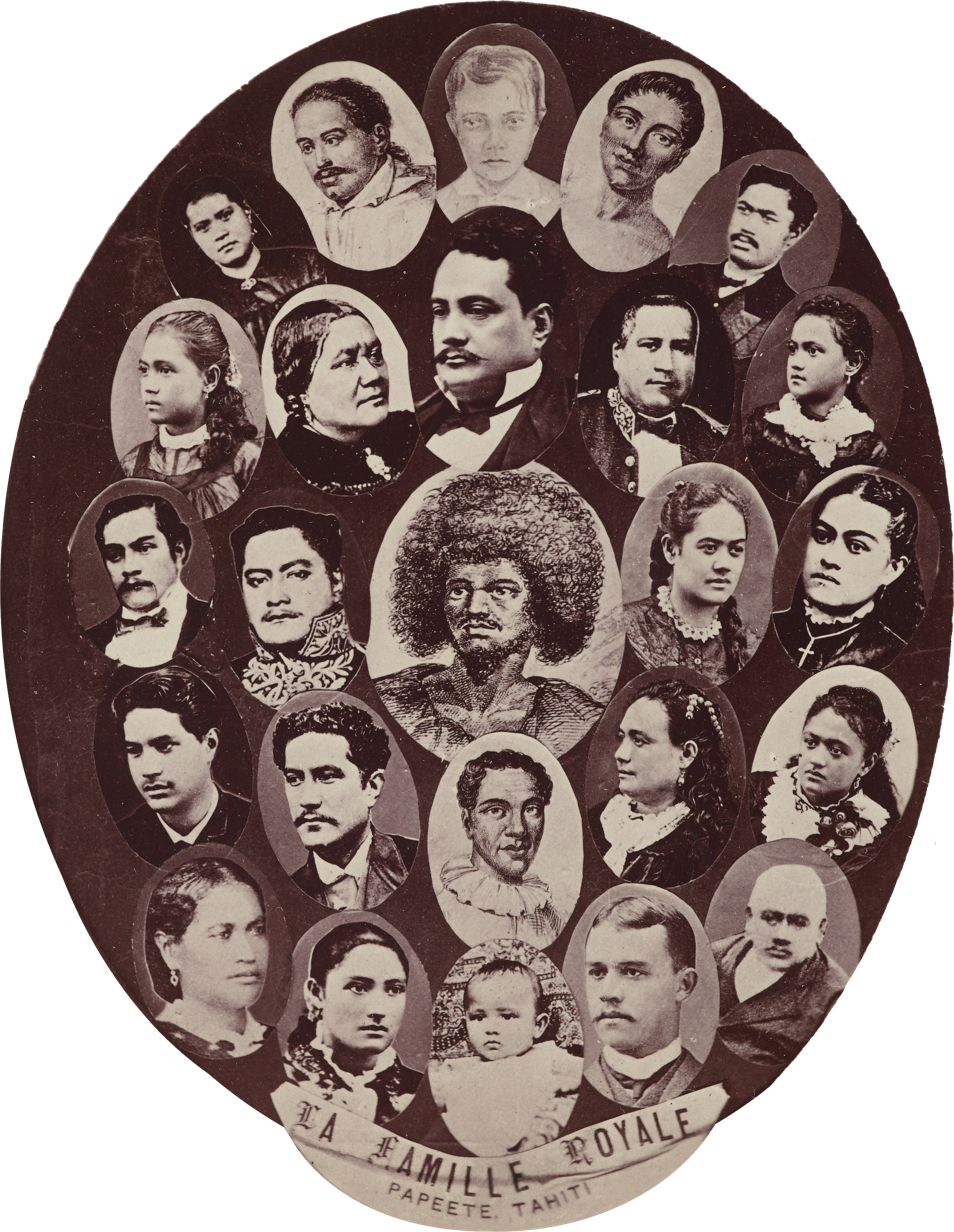
Royal Family of Tahiti

- Pōmare I, Tu Vairaʻatoa Taina (1791–1803)
- Pōmare II, Tu Tunuieaiteatua (1803–1815)
- Pōmare III, Teriʻitaria (1821–1827)
- Pōmare IV, ʻAimata (1827–1877)
- Pōmare V, Teriʻitaria Teratane (1877–1880)

== Current status ==
Until his death in 2013, Tauatomo Mairau claimed to be the heir to the Tahitian throne, and had attempted to re-assert the status of the monarchy in court. His claims were not recognised by France. On 28 May 2009, Joinville Pomare, an adopted member of the Pomare family, declared himself King Pomare XI, during a ceremony attended by descendants of leading chiefs but spurned by members of his own family. Other members of the family recognise his uncle, Léopold Pomare, as heir to the throne.

Another claimant, Athanase Teiri, claims descent from Pomare V and sovereignty over French Polynesian sea, land, and airspace. He and his associates had received some attention in politics in the Tuamotu beforehand. He and associates assembled 100 people for a declaration of an independent Moorea, and claim to have 50,000 signatures supporting Moorea's independence. (Although Moorea has only 16,000 people, the 50,000-signature figure is not necessarily untrue because it could imply that Hau Pakumotu received signatures from people both on Moorea and in other parts of French Polynesia.) He declared an independent Pakomotu Sovereign Republic State on 25 June 2010 and has called French Polynesia a "mistake". Athanase Teiri was arrested in early June 2010 for illegally issuing ID cards for his republic. He is currently being held at the Papeete police station for attempted murder of a policeman, armed rebellion, forming of a militia and illegal possession of a weapon. He had previously received a six-month jail sentence for intimidating and threatening senior officials.

Finally, on April 19, 2023, Joinville Pomare, an adopted descendant of the Pomare royal family of Tahiti, was installed as King Pomare XI in a ceremony in Papeete. The event comes two years after Joinville Pomare relaunched what he calls the Principality of Pomare in a ceremony at the tomb of King Pomare V. It will now be known as Teriʻihinoiatua Joinville Hinoiariki Pomare XI.

The ceremony was also attended by King Tuheitia Pōtatau Te Wherowhero.

France no longer recognizes a Tahitian royal family, although in 1880 Paris signed a treaty guaranteeing that Polynesian titles and customs would be maintained under its control.

== Family tree ==
Pōmare family tree

Ta'aroa Manahune	Tetuaehuri i Taiarapu
Teu; Ariʻi of Pare-Arue; Ariʻi of the Porionuʻu	Tetupaia i Hauiri of the Tamatoa; Dynasty of Raiatea
Teihotu i Ahurai; Ari'i of Moʻorea, Brother of Purea
Terereatua (Auo)	Metua'aro (Mahau); Ariʻi of Mo'orea and Vaiari	Itia	Pōmare I King of Tahiti and Moʻorea	Paiti; Ariʻi of Hapaiano
Tetuanui Tarovahine; Wife of Pōmare II	Teri'itaria Ari'ipaea; Queen of Huahine and Maʻiao	Pōmare II; King of Tahiti and Moʻorea	Teri'ito'oterai Teremoemoe	Teri'inavahoroa Vahine	Teri'inavahoroa Tane, Vehiatua; Ariʻi of Taiarapu	Terano Vahine
Pōmare III; King of Tahiti and Moʻorea	Teinaiti	Ari'ifa'aite	Pōmare IV; Queen of Tahiti and Moʻorea	Tapoa II; King of Bora Bora of the Tapoa; Dynasty of Bora Bora
Teuhe; Queen of Huahine of the Teurura'i; Dynasty of Huahine	Pōmare V King of Tahiti and Moʻorea	Marau	Ari'iaue	Teri'itua Tuavira "Prince Joinville"; Ariʻi of Hitiaʻa	Isabelle Vahinetua Shaw	Tamatoa V King of Raiatea and Tahaʻa	Moe a Mai	Teri'imaevarua II; Queen of Bora Bora	Temauiari'i a Mai	Teri'itapunui Punuari'i; Ariʻi of Mahina	Teri'inavahoroa a Mai
Teriʻihinoiatua Pōmare; Ariʻi of Hitiaʻa	Teri'imaevarua III; Queen of Bora Bora

Notes:

Descending dotted lines denote adoptions.

References

- Henry, Teuira; Orsmond, John Muggridge (1928). Ancient Tahiti. Vol. 48. Honolulu: Bernice Pauahi Bishop Museum. pp. 247–272. OCLC 3049679.
- Newbury, Colin W.; Darling, Adam J. (December 1967). "Te Hau Pahu Rahi: Pomare II and the Concept of Interisland Government in Eastern Polynesia". The Journal of the Polynesian Society. 76 (4). Wellington: The Polynesian Society: 477–514. JSTOR 20704508. OCLC 6015244633.
- Orsmond, John Muggridge; Smith, S. Percy (March 1893). "The Genealogy of the Pomare Family of Tahiti, from the Papers of the Rev. J. M. Orsmond. With Notes Thereon by S. Percy Smith". The Journal of the Polynesian Society. 2 (1). Wellington: The Polynesian Society: 25–43. JSTOR 20701269. OCLC 5544732839.
- Pomare, Tamatoa Brander; Pomare, Pomateao Salmon (15 August 1938). "The Pomares of Tahiti – Letter to the Editor". Pacific Islands Monthly. Vol. IX, no. 1. Sydney: Pacific Publications. p. 34. OCLC 780465500.
- Teissier, Raoul (1978). "Chefs et notables des Établissements Français de l'Océanie au temps du protectorat: 1842–1850". Bulletin de la Société des Études Océaniennes, Issue 202. Papeete: Société des Études Océaniennes. OCLC 9510786.

== See also ==
- Kingdom of Tahiti
- List of monarchs of Tahiti
- List of consorts of Tahiti
- Hawaii–Tahiti relations
