= Tauatomo Mairau =

Tautatomo Mairau
- Born: Rurutu, French Polynesia (French overseas territory)
- Died: May 17, 2013; Papeete, Tahiti, French Polynesia (French overseas territory)

Tauatomo Mairau (died May 17, 2013) was a member of the royal Tahitian family of Mairau, a descendant of Tahiti's Queen Pōmare IV. He was born on the island of Rurutu. As of February 2009, Tauatomo Mairau claimed to be the heir to the Tahitian throne, and attempted to re-assert the status of the monarchy in court. His claims were not recognised by France.

In 2010, he claimed he was recognized as the heir to the throne and bear the title Prince Marau of Tahiti. He was working to have royal trust lands returned to him and his family. The French government mortgaged the land after World War II, and in doing so violated the terms of the agreement signed with King Pōmare V in 1880 which reserved control of the trust lands for the royal family of Tahiti. The banks are reportedly in the process of freezing the assets, and Mairau was suing to prevent native Tahitians from being evicted from his trust lands, and wished for them to retain their usage rights over the land.

On May 17, 2013, he died in Papeete.
