= Pōmare III =

King of Tahiti from 1821 to 1827

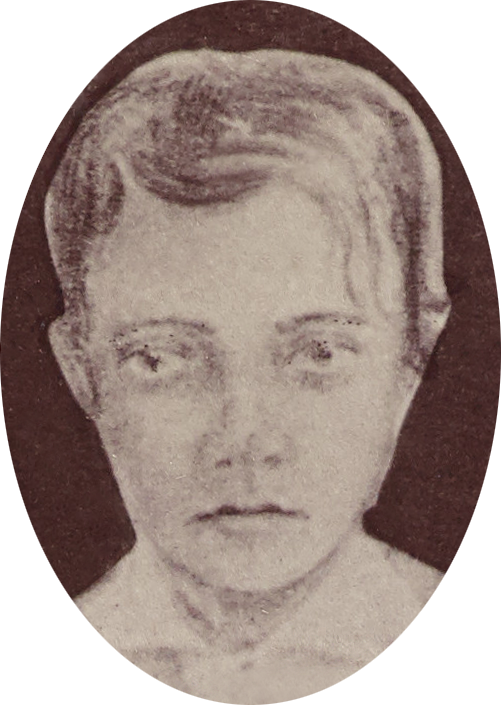
- Pōmare III, drawing from montage by Madame Sophia Hoare, 1885.

King of Tahiti
- Reign: 7 December 1821 – 11 January 1827
- Coronation: 21 April 1824
- Predecessor: Pōmare II
- Successor: Pōmare IV
- Regent: Teriʻitoʻoterai Tere-moe-moe; Teriʻitariʻa Ariʻipaea Vahine five principal chiefs of Tahiti
- Born: 25 June 1820; Military Hospital, Papofai
- Died: 11 January 1827 (aged 6); Papetoai, Moʻorea
- Burial: Pōmare Royal Cemetery, Papaʻoa, ʻArue
Names
- Teriʻitariʻa Pōmare III
- House: House of Pōmare
- Father: Pōmare II
- Mother: Teriʻitoʻoterai Tere-moe-moe
- Religion: Reformed

Pōmare III (1820–1827), born Teriʻitariʻa, was the king of Tahiti between 1821 and 1827. He was the second son of King Pōmare II and his second wife, Queen Teriʻitoʻoterai Tere-moe-moe. Sources differ on his relation to his sister with missionary sources citing them as half-siblings while later sources cited Tere-moe-moe as their mother.

== Biography ==
He was born at Papofai, on 25 June 1820, as Teriʻitariʻa, and was baptised 10 September 1820. He succeeded to the throne on the death of his father 7 December 1821. He was crowned at Papaʻoa, ʻArue, 21 April 1824.

The British missionaries decided that Pomare should have a coronation, although Tahitian tradition required investment with a sacred girdle and did not involve the use of a crown. The coronation was arranged by the British missionary Henry Nott and involved a procession of Tahitian judges and other dignitaries as well as British missionaries, accompanying the infant king, seated in a covered chair, to a specially-constructed stone platform. Here he sat behind a table carrying a crown, a bible and a book of Tahitian law. Mr. Davies, a senior missionary, spoke on his behalf, confirming that he agreed to reign with justice and mercy, according to the law and the word of God. Nott then placed the crown on his head.

While Pomare was king the missionaries advanced their own agenda in his name, for example by having him write to George IV to request British protection and the British flag.

He ruled under the regency of his mother Queen Teriʻitoʻoterai Teremoemoe, his aunt and stepmother Teriʻitariʻa Ariʻipaea vahine, and the five principal chiefs of Tahiti due to his minority.

Pōmare III's education took place at the South Sea Academy, Papetoai, Moʻorea. He died of dysentery on 11 January 1827 and was succeeded by his full sister, ʻAimata Pōmare IV Vahine o Punuateraʻiatua, who reigned 1827–1877.

== Ancestry ==
Ancestors of Pōmare III

8. Teu Tunuieaite Atua
4. Pōmare I
9. Tetupaia-i-Hauiri
2. Pōmare II
10. Teihotu-i-Ahura’i
5. Tetua-nui-reia-i-te-raʻi-atea
11. Vave’a Tetua-nui-rei-a-ite Ra’iatea
1. Pōmare III
12. Vetea-raʻi Uʻuru
6. Tamatoa IV
13. Opai-pai Te-roro
3. Teri’to'-o-terai Tere-moe-moe
14. Mato Teri’i Tepoara’i
7. Tu-ra’i-ariʻi E-he-vahine
15. Te-ha’apapa I

Regnal titles
Preceded by Pōmare II	King of Tahiti; 1821–1827	Succeeded by Pōmare IV
