= Pomara =

Pomara may refer to:

- Pomara, Bangladesh, village of Rangunia Upazila at Chittagong District in the Division of Chittagong, Bangladesh
- Pomara massacre, live burial of 13 unarmed Bengali Hindus of Pomara Union, in 1971 by the Pakistani Army

== People ==
- Pomara Fifth, Australian drag performer
- John Pomara, American abstract artist
- Hemi Pomara (born c. 1831-?), man of Māori chiefly descent

== See also ==
- Pomare (disambiguation)
- Pomare (disambiguation)
