= Purea =

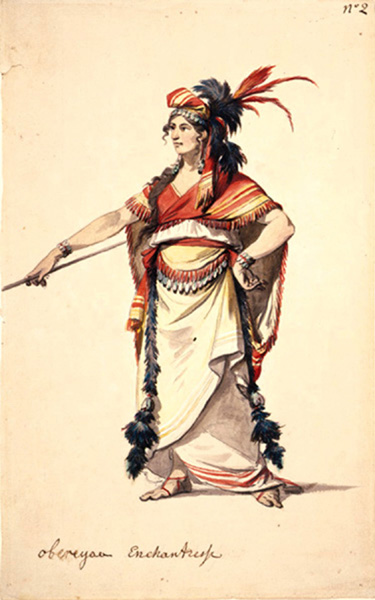
Costume design for the character of Purea, for the pantomime Omai by Philip James de Loutherbourg, 1785

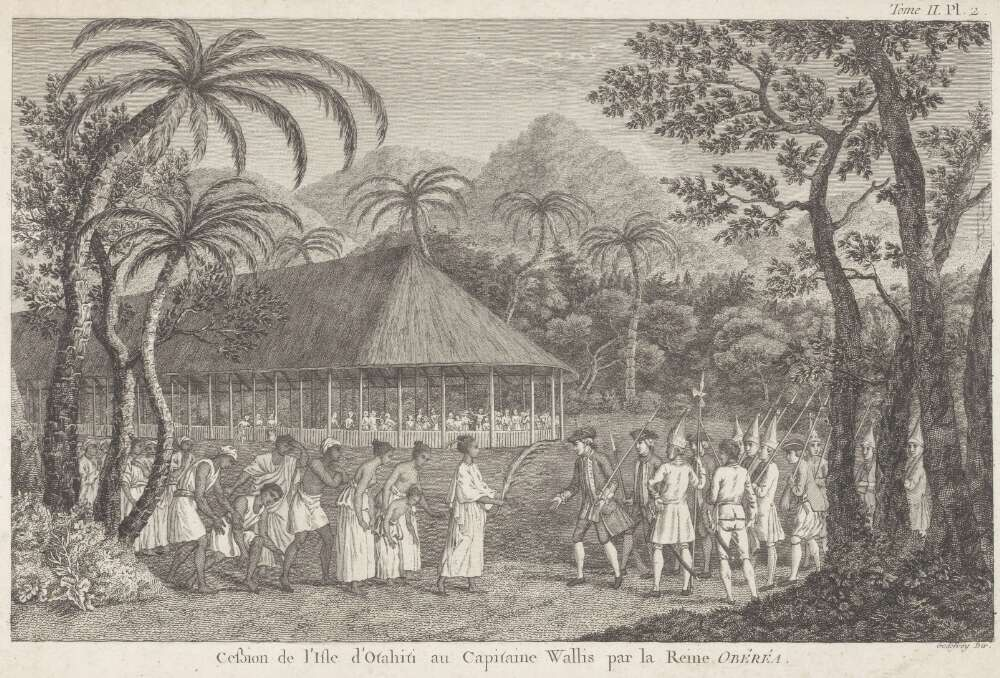
Captain Samuel Wallis of HMS Dolphin being received by Purea, July 1767

Purea, Tevahine-'ai-roro-atua-i-Ahurai, also called Oborea (floruit 1769), was a female chieftain of Faʻaʻā and the wife of Amo, the chief of Papara. Queen Purea is known from the first famous European expeditions to Tahiti. She ruled as chieftainess of her tribe area in 1767–1768, when she was encountered by the expedition of Samuel Wallis.

== Life ==
=== Early life ===
Purea inherited the chieftainship of Faʻaʻā from her father. Purea's mother was the high chieftainess of the Ahurai marae in Faʻaʻā. Purea married Amo, a member of the Teva clan and high chief of Papara. Their marriage ended with the birth of their son Teri'irere, and Tupaia became her lover.

=== Wallis expedition ===
The first European to have visited Tahiti according to existing records was lieutenant Samuel Wallis, who was circumnavigating the globe in HMS Dolphin, and landed on 17 June 1767 in Matavai Bay, situated on the territory of the chiefdom of Pare (Arue/Mahina), governed by the female chieftain "Oberea" (Purea). Wallis named the island King George Island. The first contacts were difficult, since on the 24 and the 26 June 1767, the canoes tried to take the ship and beach it, possibly because they were afraid the English had intentions of staying permanently, or possibly to take possession of the metallic objects from the ship. In retaliation, the English sailors opened fire on the canoes and on the crowds on the hills. In reaction to this powerful counter-attack, the inhabitants of the bay laid down offerings for the English, showing their wish for peace or to submit. Following this episode, Samuel Wallis was able to establish cordial relations with the female chieftain “Oberea “ (Purea) and remained on the island until 27 July 1767.

In 1767–68 Purea and her husband Amo built Mahaiatea, a place intended to be the ritual center of Tahiti.

=== Cook's expeditions ===
James Cook arrived in Tahiti on board HMS Endeavour in April 1769 and remained on the island until August. He set up camp at Matavai Bay along with Charles Green and Daniel Solander. Assisted by the botanist Joseph Banks, and by the artist Sydney Parkinson, Cook gathered valuable information on the fauna and flora, as well as the native society, language and customs. Cook estimated the population to be 200,000 including all the nearby islands in the chain. This estimate was later lowered to 35,000 by anthropologist Douglas L. Oliver, the foremost modern authority on Tahiti, at the time of first European contact in 1767. His crew moreover maintained friendly relations with the cheftainess "Oberea" (Purea), whom they mistakenly took to be the Queen of Tahiti. These exchanges created favorable conditions for the rise of the Pōmare dynasty.

Cook later returned to Tahiti between 15 August and 1 September 1773, and for the last time between 13 August and 8 December 1777. On these visits Cook made harbour at Tautira Bay, which is sometimes known as Cook's Anchorage. During his final stay he accompanied the chief Tū (nephew of the female chieftain "Oberea" (Purea)) on a warring expedition to Mo'orea ('Aimeo).

== Legacy ==
Purea entered the European imagination as something between a traditional monarch and a queen of the fairies.
