= Pōmare V =

King of Tahiti from 1877 to 1880

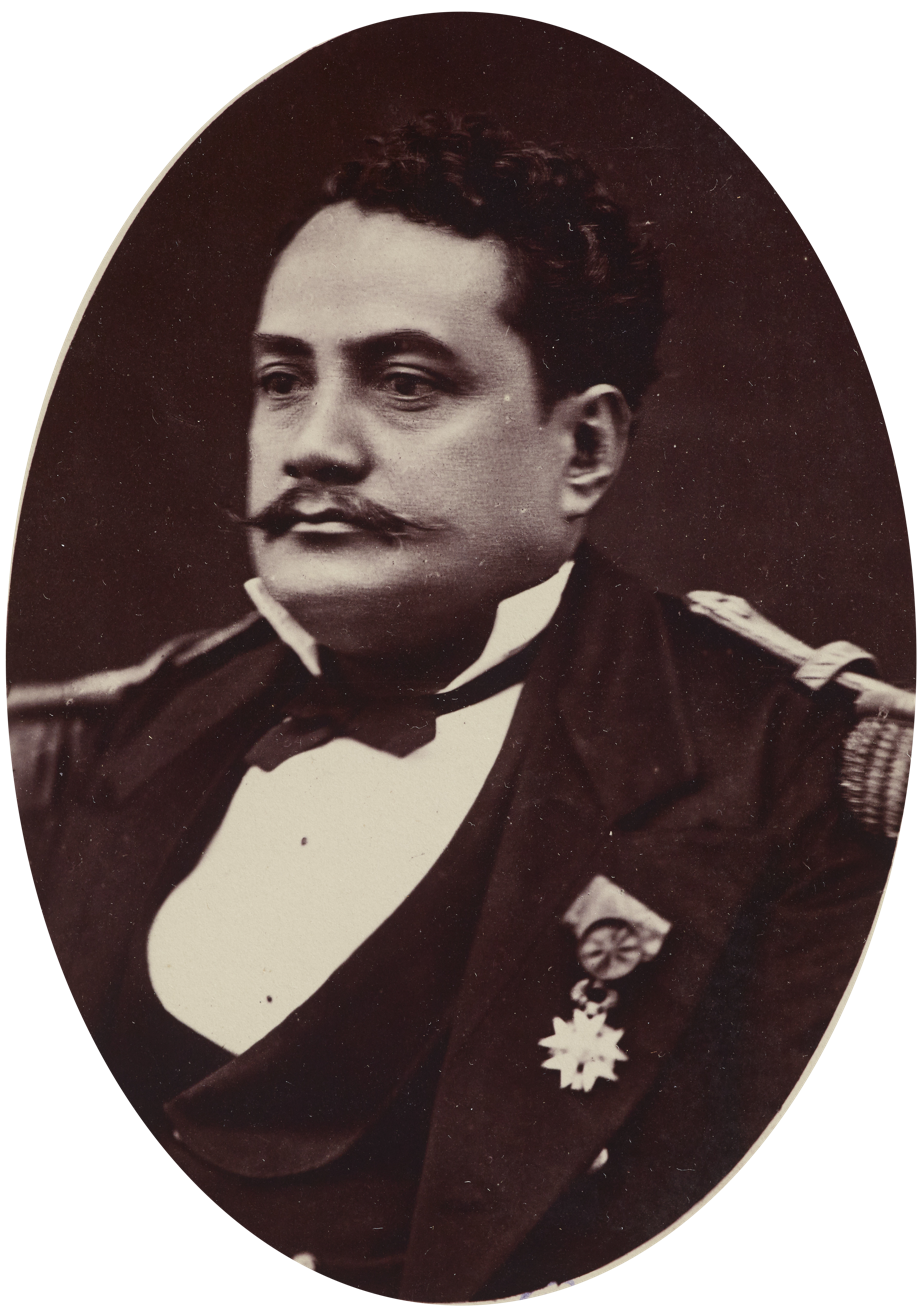

King of Tahiti
- Reign: 17 September 1877 – 29 June 1880
- Coronation: 24 September 1877
- Predecessor: Pōmare IV
- Successor: Position abolished
- Born: 3 November 1839; Afaʻahiti, Taravao
- Died: 12 June 1891 (aged 51); Royal Palace, Papeʻete, Tahiti
- Burial: Tomb of the King, Utuʻaiʻai in ʻArue
- Spouse: Teuhe (m. 1857; div. 1861) Marau Salmon (m. 1875; div. 1887)
- Issue: Teriʻi nui o Tahiti; Takau Pōmare-Vedel; Ernest Albert Salmon (disputed)
Names
- Teriʻitariʻa Terātane Pōmare
- House: House of Pōmare
- Father: Ariʻifaʻaite
- Mother: Pōmare IV
- Religion: Reformed

Pōmare V (3 November 1839 – 12 June 1891) was the last monarch of Tahiti, reigning from 1877 until his forced abdication in 1880. He was the son of Queen Pōmare IV.

== Biography ==
He was born as Teri'i Tari'a Te-rā-tane and became Heir Apparent and Crown Prince (Ari'i-aue) upon the death of his elder brother on 13 May 1855. He became king of Tahiti on the death of his mother on 17 September 1877. His coronation was on 24 September 1877 at Pape'ete.

He married twice, first on 11 November 1857 to Te-mā-ri'i-Ma'i-hara Te-uhe-a-Te-uru-ra'i, princess of Huahine. He divorced her on 5 August 1861. His second marriage was to Joanna Marau-Ta'aroa Te-pa'u Salmon (thereafter known as Her Majesty The Queen Marau of Tahiti), at Pape'ete on 28 January 1875. He divorced her on 27 July 1887.

Pōmare V had one son and two daughters.

On 29 June 1880, he gave Tahiti and its dependencies to France, whereupon he was given a pension by the French government and the titular position of Officer of the Orders of the Legion of Honour and Agricultural Merit of France.

He died at the Royal Palace, Pape'ete, and is buried at the Tomb of the King, Utu'ai'ai in 'Arue.

== Honours ==
=== French Honours ===
- Officer of the Order of the Legion of Honour (09/11/1880).
- Officer of the Order of Agricultural Merit (09/11/1880).

== Ancestry ==
Ancestors of Pōmare V

4. Ariʻipeu-a-Hiro
2. Ariʻifaʻaite
10. Tamatoa IV (= 14)
5. Teihotu Taʻavea
11. Tu-ra’i-ariʻi E-he-vahine (= 15)
1. Pōmare V
12. Pōmare I
6. Pōmare II
13. Tetua-nui-reia-i-te-raʻi-atea
3. Pōmare IV
14. Tamatoa IV (= 10)
7. Teri’to’-o-terai Tere-moe-moe
15. Tu-ra’i-ariʻi E-he-vahine (= 11)

== See also ==
Regnal titles
Preceded by Pōmare IV	King of Tahiti; 1877–1880	Monarchy abolished Sovereignty ceded to France
Titles in pretence
Loss of title Sovereignty ceded to France	— TITULAR — King of Tahiti; 1880–1891	Disputed
