= Pōmare II =

King of Tahiti from 1791 to 1821

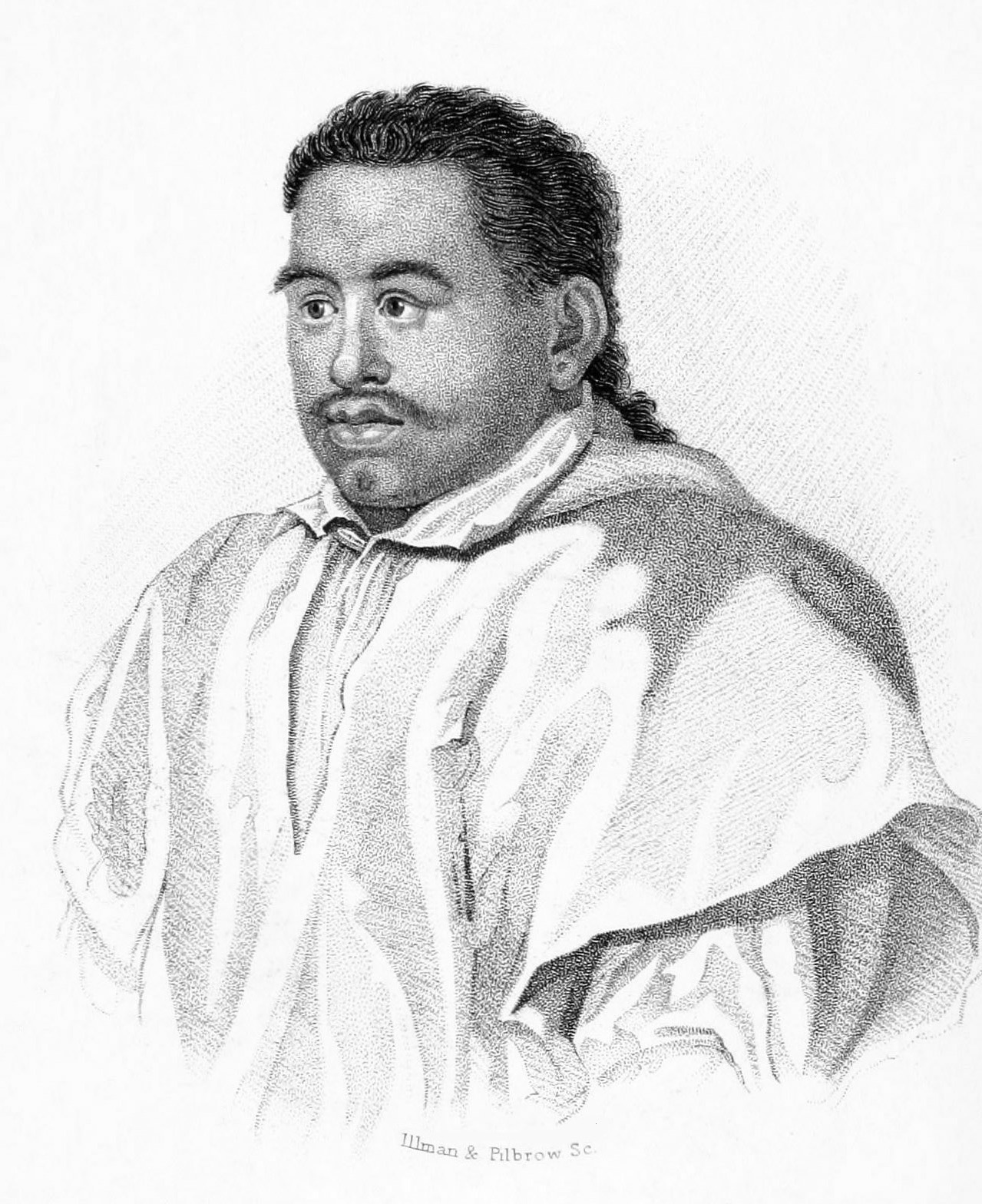

King of Tahiti
- Reign: 13 February 1791 – 7 December 1821
- Coronation: 13 February 1791
- Predecessor: Pōmare I
- Successor: Pōmare III
- Regent: Pōmare I
- Born: c. 1782
- Died: 7 December 1821; Motu Uta, Papeete, Tahiti
- Burial: Pōmare Royal Cemetery, Papaʻoa, ʻArue
- Spouse: Tetuanui Tarovahine; Teriʻitoʻoterai Teremoemoe; Teriʻitariʻa Ariʻipaea Vahine
- Issue: Pōmare IV; Teinaiti; Pōmare III
Names
- Tū Tūnuiʻēʻaiteatua Pōmare II
- House: House of Pōmare
- Father: Pōmare I
- Mother: Iti'a Tetuanuireiaitera'iatea
- Religion: Tahitian later Reformed

Pōmare II (c. 1782 – 7 December 1821) (fully Tu Tunuieaiteatua Pōmare II or in modern orthography Tū Tū-nui-ʻēʻa-i-te-atua Pōmare II; historically misspelled as Tu Tunuiea'aite-a-tua), was the second king of Tahiti between 1791 and 1821. He was installed by his father Pōmare I at Tarahoi, 13 February 1791. He ruled under regency from 1791 to 1803.

== Coronation ==
On 13 February 1791, James Morisson attended the ceremony in which the young king Pōmare II was invested with the Maro 'Ura, or Royal Sash. The event took place in the district of Pare, on the newly constructed marae. On that day, thirty human sacrifices were offered, some of whom had been killed nearly a month earlier. He ruled under regency from 1791 until his father's death on 3 September 1803.

== Titles ==
According to the writings of English missionary in 1799, Pōmare II's title was "Otoo.noo.ey te Ātoo'ā" (O Tu nui ai te Atua). He was revered as a divine figure. His celestial residence was known as "Yow Rye" ('A'o Ra'i, meaning "clouds of heaven"), and his double canoe was called "Ān'ooānooā" (Anuanua, or "rainbow"). His manner of riding on the shoulders of an attendant was known as Māh'owtā (Mahuta, meaning "flying". His torch, "Oowe'erā" (O Uira, or "lightning"), and the drum "Pāte'ere" (Patiri, or "thunder"), which was frequently played for his amusement, further emphasized his embodiment of elemental forces. According to their writings in 1806, Pōmare II had different names in various districts. In Pare, he was called "Tunu-e-ae-tɛ-tua" (Tu nui ai te atua); in Faaʻa, "Tʻ-Ɛree vaɛ.ɛ.tua" (Te ariʻi vae atua); in Atehuru, "Tɛ-vahe-atua" (Te vahi atua); in Taiarapu, "Tʻ-Ɛree-navahoroa" (Te ariʻi na vaho roa); and in Eimeo (Moʻorea), "Punua-tɛ-rae-ɛ-tua" (Punua te raʻi atua). These names, given to the king, signified his authority as one invested with the power that traditionally belonged to the various chiefs presiding over different districts and were used on special occasions.

== Life ==
Initially recognised as supreme sovereign and Ariʻi-maro-ʻura by the ruler of Huahine, he was subsequently forced from Tahiti and took refuge in Moʻorea on 22 December 1808 after being driven from Tahiti by a coalition of rival chiefs, but returned and defeated his enemies at the Battle of Te Feipī, on 11 November 1815. (Note: Te Feipī translates as "the Ripe Plantain" in Tahitian. The British missionaries recorded that the Battle of Te Feipī occurred on the Sabbath 12 November 1815. However, the local Tahitian calendar was one day ahead of the rest of the world and was not corrected until 1848.) He was thereafter recognised as undisputed king (Te Ariʻi-nui-o-Tahiti) of Tahiti, Moʻorea and its dependencies.

On 15 November 1815, he proclaimed himself King of Tahiti and Moʻorea in the name of the Christian God.

Pōmare II extended his realm to land outside of the Society Islands. He inherited his father's dominion over the Tuamotus and settled many conflicts between the disparate local chieftains in 1817 and 1821. However, his family's rule only extended to the eastern and central portions of the Tuamotus archipelago. In 1819, the king took nominal possession of Raivavae and Tubuai in the Austral Islands, although control was relegated to the local chiefs.

== Conversion to Christianity ==
Pomare II believed that he lost favour with the god 'Oro, and, aided by the missionary Henry Nott, he began paying more attention to the God of the Christians.

He was baptised on 16 May 1819 at the Royal Chapel, Papeʻete – Christianity and the support of English missionaries aided the centralisation of monarchic power.

Three London Missionary Society missionaries, Henry Bicknell, William Henry, and Charles Wilson preached at the baptism of King Pōmare II. Afterwards, "Henry Bicknell stood on the steps of the pulpit, took water from a basin held by William Henry, and poured it" on King Pōmare's head.

Today a majority of 54% of the French Polynesian population belongs to various Protestant churches, especially the Maohi Protestant Church which is the largest and accounts for more than 50% of the population. It traces its origins to Pomare II, the king of Tahiti, who converted from traditional beliefs to the Reformed tradition brought to the islands by the London Missionary Society.

== Family ==
Pōmare II was married first before March 1797 (betrothed January 1792) to his double first cousin Tetua-nui Taro-vahine, Ariʻi of Vaiari (now Papeari), who died at ʻArue, on 21 July 1806. Around 1809, he married two sisters: Teriʻitoʻoterai Teremoemoe and Teriʻitariʻa who were daughters of Tamatoa III, Ariʻi Rahi of Raiatea.

With his second wife Teriʻitoʻoterai Teremoemoe, he had three children:

- ʻAimata (28 February 1813 – 17 September 1877), who ruled as Pōmare IV
- Teinaiti (21 November 1817 – 20 March 1818), who died young
- Teriʻitariʻa (25 June 1820 – 8 January 1827), who ruled as Pōmare III

== Death ==
Pōmare died of alcohol-related causes at Motu Uta, Papeete, Tahiti on 7 December 1821.

He was succeeded by his son Pōmare III, who reigned 1821–1827.

== Ancestry ==
Ancestors of Pōmare II

8. Tu-moe-hania
4. Teu Tunuieaite Atua
9. Tetua-huria
2. Pōmare I
10. Tamatoa III
5. Tetupaia-i-Hauiri
11. Mai-he’a
1. Pōmare II
12. Teri’i-Vaetua-i-Ahura’i
6. Teihotu-i-Ahura’i
13. Airoro-ana’a-i-Farepu’a
3. Tetua-nui-reia-i-te-raʻi-atea
14. Punua Teraitua-i-Nu’urua
7. Vave’a Tetua-nui-rei-a-ite Ra’iatea
15. Fetefete-te-ui

== See also ==
- Pōmare Dynasty
- Kingdom of Tahiti
- List of monarchs of Tahiti
- List of deaths through alcohol
- First missionaries in Polynesia

== Bibliography ==
- Adams, Henry (1901). Tahiti: Memoirs of Arii Taimai. Ridgewood, NJ: The Gregg Press. OCLC 21482.
- Adams, Henry, ed. (1964). Mémoires d'Arii Taimai (in French). Translated by Lebois, Suzanne; Lebois, André. Paris: Société des Océanistes. doi:10.4000/books.sdo.117. ISBN 978-2-85430-090-1. OCLC 929726896.
- Banks, Joseph (1896). Hooker, Joseph D. (ed.). Journal of the Right Hon. Sir Joseph Banks... during Captain Cook's first voyage in H.M.S. Endeavour in 1768-71 to Terra del Fuego, Otahite, New Zealand, Australia, the Dutch East Indies, etc. London; New York: Macmillan & Co., Ltd. OCLC 729691819.
- Baré, Jean-François (1987). Tahiti, les temps et les pouvoirs: pour une anthropologie historique du Tahiti post-européen (PDF) (in French). Paris: ORSTOM, Institut français de recherche scientifique pour le développement en coopération. ISBN 978-2-7099-0847-4. OCLC 16654716.
- Bligh, William (1792). Nicol, George (ed.). A voyage to the South sea, undertaken by command of His Majesty, for the purpose of conveying the bread-fruit tree to the West Indies, in His Majesty's ship the Bounty. London: G. Nicol. pp. 55–144. OCLC 1158276855.
- Bligh, William (1920). Lee, Ida (ed.). Captain Bligh's second voyage to the South Sea. London, New York [etc.]: Longmans, Green. OCLC 1041588401.
- Bovis, Edmond de (1892) [1855]. "Chapitre : Notices historiques : État de la société tahitienne à l'arrivée des Européens : par M. de Bovis, lieutenant de vaisseau. (Revue coloniale, année 1855)". In Imp. du gouvernement (ed.). Annuaire des établissements français de l'Océanie pour 1892. Papeete: Imp. du gouvernement. pp. 41–96. OCLC 894107561.
- Brander, Winnifred (1978). Emory, Kenneth P. (ed.). Genealogies of maraes Taputapuatea, Vaiotaha, Nuurua, Farefoi and of the Tevas. Society Islands Genealogies. FamilySearch International. OCLC 866045493.
- Brown, William; Clarke, Adam (1816). The History of missions : or, of the propagation of Christianity among the heathen, since the Reformation. Vol. 2. Philadelphia: B. Coles. OCLC 425989873.
- Cadousteau, Geneviève (Mai-Arii) (1987). "Généalogies des Arii des Iles de la Société". Bulletin de la Société des Études Océaniennes (in French) (239–240) (1st ed.). Papeete: Société des Études Océaniennes: 1–131.
- Cook, James (1893). Wharton, William James Lloyd (ed.). Captain Cook's Journal During His First Voyage Round the World Made in H.M. Bark "Endeavour" 1768–1771. London: Elliot Stock. OCLC 1042058262.
- Cook, James (1777a). A voyage towards the South Pole, and round the world : performed in His Majesty's ships the Resolution and Adventure, in the years 1772, 1773, 1774, and 1775. [...] In two volumes. Vol. I. London: W. Strahan and T. Caddel. OCLC 973593160.
- Cook, James (1777b). A voyage towards the South Pole, and round the world : performed in His Majesty's ships the Resolution and Adventure, in the years 1772, 1773, 1774, and 1775. [...] In two volumes. Vol. II. London: W. Strahan and T. Caddel. OCLC 973593160.
- Cook, James (1784). A voyage to the Pacific ocean. Undertaken, by the command of His Majesty, for making discoveries in the Northern hemisphere [...] in His Majesty's ships the Resolution and Discovery, in the years 1776, 1777, 1778, 1779, and 1780. In three volumes. Vol. II. London: G. Nicol and T. Caddel. OCLC 1158281685.
- Corney, Bolton Glanville (1913). The Quest and Occupation of Tahiti by Emissaries of Spain During the Years 1772-1776...Volume I Second series no. 32. London: The Hakluyt Society. OCLC 25380033.
- Corney, Bolton Glanville (1914). The Quest and Occupation of Tahiti by Emissaries of Spain During the Years 1772-1776...Volume II Second series no. 36. London: The Hakluyt Society. OCLC 1070912781.
- Corney, Bolton Glanville (1919). The Quest and Occupation of Tahiti by Emissaries of Spain During the Years 1772-1776...Volume III containing the diary of Maximo Rodrigez. Second series no. 43. London: The Hakluyt Society. pp. 1–218. OCLC 1239788290.
- Davies, John (1808). "Journal of John Davies, Tahiti. 21 August 1807 – 22 November 1808". Records of the London Missionary Society (as filmed by the AJCP) [microform] : [M1-M116, M608-M670] 1795-1825 [i.e. 1795-1925]/Series. South Seas journals/File 31 (Box 3)/John Davies, Tahiti. Canberra: National Library of Australia.
- Davies, John (1810). "Journal of John Davies, Tahiti, Fidji. 01 May 1808 – 24 February 1810". Records of the London Missionary Society (as filmed by the AJCP) [microform] : [M1-M116, M608-M670] 1795-1825 [i.e. 1795-1925]/Series. South Seas journals/File 33 (Box 3)/John Davies, Tahiti, Fiji. Canberra: National Library of Australia.
- Davies, John (1814). "Journal of John Davies. 15 February 1813 – 26 April 1814". South Seas Journals/File 35 (Box 3)/John Davies, Eimeo (Mo'orea). Canberra: National Library of Australia.
- Davies, John (1830). "The history of the Tahitian Mission". Records of the London Missionary Society (as filmed by the AJCP) [microform] : [M1-M116, M608-M670] 1795-1825 [i.e. 1795-1925]/Series. Papua reports/File. John Davies. 'The history of the Tahitian Mission'. Canberra: National Library of Australia.
- Davies, John; Herbert, John (1851). A Tahitian and English dictionary. Tahiti: London missionary society's press. OCLC 1085665962.
- Davies, John; Youl, John; al. (1806). "Journal of John Davies, John Youl and others, Tahiti. 03 March 1806 – 11 August 1806". Records of the London Missionary Society (as filmed by the AJCP) [microform] : [M1-M116, M608-M670] 1795-1825 [i.e. 1795-1925]/Series. South Seas journals/File 27 (Box 2)/John Davies, John Youl and others, Tahiti. Canberra: National Library of Australia.
- Davies, John (2017) [1961]. Newbury, Colin W. (ed.). The History of the Tahitian Mission, 1799–1830, Written by John Davies, Missionary to the South Sea Islands: With Supplementary Papers of the Missionaries. London: The Hakluyt Society. doi:10.4324/9781315557137. ISBN 978-1-317-02871-0. OCLC 992401577.
- Dening, Greg (April 1986). "Possessing Tahiti". Archaeology in Oceania. 21 (1). Sydney: Wiley for Oceania Publications, University of Sydney: 103–118. doi:10.1002/j.1834-4453.1986.tb00130.x. JSTOR 40386717. OCLC 5697479565.
- Dodd, Edward (1983). The Rape of Tahiti. New York: Dodd, Mead & Company. ISBN 978-0-396-08114-2. OCLC 8954158.
- Dumont d'Urville, Jules-Sébastien-César (1834). Voyage pittoresque autour du monde : résumé général des voyages de découvertes de Magellan, Tasman, Dampier, Anson, Byron... [etc.] (in French). Vol. 1. Paris: L. Tenre; Henri Dupuis. pp. 476–574. OCLC 432994363.
- Dumont d'Urville, Jules-Sébastien-César (1835). Voyage pittoresque autour du monde : résumé général des voyages de découvertes de Magellan, Tasman, Dampier, Anson, Byron... [etc.] (in French). Vol. 2. Paris: L. Tenre; Henri Dupuis. pp. 1–5. OCLC 311370727.
- Edwards, Edward; Hamilton, George (1915). Voyage of H. M. S. "Pandora" Despatched to Arrest the Mutineers of the "Bounty" in the South Seas, 1790-91. London: Francis Edwards.
- Ellis, William (1829a). Polynesian researches, during a residence of nearly six years in the South Sea Islands, including descriptions of the natural history and scenery of the Islands, with remarks on the history, mythology, traditions, government, arts, manners, and customs of the inhabitants. Vol. I (1st ed.). London: Fisher, Son, & Jackson. OCLC 17879297.
- Ellis, William (1829b). Polynesian researches, during a residence of nearly six years in the South Sea Islands, including descriptions of the natural history and scenery of the Islands, with remarks on the history, mythology, traditions, government, arts, manners, and customs of the inhabitants. Vol. II (1st ed.). London: Fisher, Son, & Jackson. OCLC 17879297.
- Ellis, William (1831a). Polynesian Researches, During a Residence of Nearly Eight Years in the Society and Sandwich Islands. Vol. I (2nd ed.). London: Fisher, Son, & Jackson. OCLC 1157055165.
- Ellis, William (1831b). Polynesian Researches, During a Residence of Nearly Eight Years in the Society and Sandwich Islands. Vol. II (2nd ed.). London: Fisher, Son, & Jackson. OCLC 1157058552.
- Ellis, William (1831c). Polynesian Researches, During a Residence of Nearly Eight Years in The Society and Sandwich Islands. Vol. III (2nd ed.). London: Fisher, Son & Jackson. OCLC 1157060556.
- Ellis, William (1831d). A Vindication of the South Sea Missions from the Misrepresentations of Otto Von Kotzebue, Captain in the Russian Navy: With an Appendix. London: F. Westley and A.H. Davis. OCLC 14184834.
- Emory, Kenneth P. (1971). Stone remains in the Society Islands. New York: Kraus Reprint. OCLC 1200553047.
- Emory, Kenneth P. (1978). Traditional history of maraes in the Society Islands. FamilySearch International. OCLC 226381225.
- Evangelical Magazine and Missionary Chronicle (October 1816). "South Sea Mission". The Evangelical Magazine and Missionary Chronicle. London: Williams and Son. pp. 405–409. OCLC 682032291.
- Garrett, John (1982). To Live Among the Stars: Christian Origins in Oceania. Suva, Fiji: Institute of Pacific Studies, University of the South Pacific. ISBN 978-2-8254-0692-2. OCLC 17485209.
- Gonschor, Lorenz Rudolf (August 2008). Law as a Tool of Oppression and Liberation: Institutional Histories and Perspectives on Political Independence in Hawaiʻi, Tahiti Nui/French Polynesia and Rapa Nui (PDF) (MA thesis). Honolulu: University of Hawaii at Manoa. hdl:10125/20375. OCLC 798846333.
- Greatheed, Samuel (1799). "Preliminary discourse : containing a geographical and historical account of the islands where missionaries have settled, and of others with which they are connected". In Wilson, James (ed.). A missionary voyage to the southern Pacific ocean, performed in the years 1796, 1797, 1798, in the ship Duff, commanded by Captain James Wilson. London: T. Chapman. pp. i–Ixxxvi. OCLC 1049640919.
- Gregory, William (1800). A visible display of divine providence; or, the journal of a captured missionary, designated to the southern Pacific Ocean, in the second voyage of the ship Duff, ... captured by Le Grand Buonaparte, ... including every remarkable occurrence which took place ... in the years 1798 and 1799. By William Gregory, ... With extracts compiled from the journals of Messrs. Rev. Peter Levesque, Rev. John Hill, James Jones, John Levesque, and other missionaries captured in the Duff. 1800. London: T. Gillet. OCLC 224629975.
- Gunson, Niel (June 1962). "An Account of the Mamaia or Visionary Heresy of Tahiti, 1826–1841". The Journal of the Polynesian Society. 71 (2). Wellington: The Polynesian Society: 209–243. JSTOR 20703998. OCLC 5544737364.
- Gunson, Niel (January 1966). "Journal of a Visit to Raivavae in October 1819: By Pomare II, King of Tahiti". The Journal of Pacific History. 1 (1). Canberra: Australian National University: 199–203. doi:10.1080/00223346608572091. JSTOR 25167875. OCLC 5543899233.
- Gunson, Niel (July 2016). "Manuscript XXX: The Letters of Pā". The Journal of Pacific History. 51 (3). Canberra: Australian National University: 330–342. doi:10.1080/00223344.2016.1230076. OCLC 6835510203. S2CID 163709722.
- Gunson, Niel (January 1969). "Pomare II of Tahiti and Polynesian Imperialism". The Journal of Pacific History. 4 (1). Canberra: Australian National University: 65–82. doi:10.1080/00223346908572146. JSTOR 25167978. OCLC 4655132074.
- Gunson, Niel (July 1987). "Sacred Women Chiefs and Female 'Headmen' in Polynesian History". The Journal of Pacific History. 22 (3). Canberra: Australian National University: 139–172. doi:10.1080/00223348708572563. JSTOR 25168930. OCLC 5543864601.
- Handy, Edward Smith Craighill (1927). Polynesian religion. Honolulu: Bernice P. Bishop Museum Bulletin 34. OCLC 635677716.
- Handy, Edward Smith Craighill (1930). History and culture in the Society Islands. Honolulu: Bernice P. Bishop Museum Bulletin 79. OCLC 468642095.
- Hargrove, William (1809). Some interesting particulars of the second voyage made by the missionary ship, the Duff, which was captured by the Buonaparte privateer in the year 1800 (Errata 1799). Knaresborough: Hargrove and Sons. OCLC 559307607.
- Hawkesworth, John (1773). An account of the voyages undertaken by the order of His present Majesty for making discoveries in the Southern Hemisphere [...] In three volumes. Vol. II. London: W. Strahan and T. Cadell. OCLC 1038779085.
- Henry, Teuira; Orsmond, John Muggridge (1928). Ancient Tahiti. Vol. 48. Honolulu: Bernice Pauahi Bishop Museum. OCLC 3049679.
- Jefferson, John (1799). "Journal of John Jefferson, Tahiti. 01 January 1799 – 31 December 1799". Records of the London Missionary Society (as filmed by the AJCP) [microform] : [M1-M116, M608-M670] 1795-1825 [i.e. 1795-1925]/Series. South Seas journals/File 6 (Box 1)/John Jefferson, Tahiti. Canberra: National Library of Australia.
- Kirk, Robert W. (2012). Paradise Past: The Transformation of the South Pacific, 1520–1920. Jefferson, NC: McFarland & Company, Inc., Publishers. ISBN 978-0-7864-9298-5. OCLC 1021200953.
- Layton, Monique (2015). The New Arcadia: Tahiti's Cursed Myth. Victoria, BC: FriesenPress. ISBN 978-1-4602-6860-5. OCLC 930600657.
- Lemaître, Yves (1995). Le lexique du tahitien contemporain : tahitien-français, français-tahitien (PDF). Paris: ORSTOM. ISBN 2-7099-1247-3. OCLC 1048786112.
- London Missionary Society (1818a). Narrative of the Mission at Otaheite, and other islands in the South Seas; commenced by the London Missionary Society in the year 1797, with a map, etc. London: London Missionary Society. OCLC 228695988.
- London Missionary Society (1804). Transactions of the Missionary Society, from its institution in the year 1795, to the end of the year 1802. Vol. I (1795-1802) (2nd ed.). London: T. Williams. OCLC 416654715.
- London Missionary Society (1806). Transactions of the Missionary Society, for the years 1803-4-5-6. Vol. II (1803-1806). London: T. Williams. OCLC 416654715.
- London Missionary Society (1813). Transactions of the Missionary Society, to the end of the year 1812. Vol. III (1807-1812). London: Williams and son. OCLC 416654715.
- London Missionary Society (1818b). Transactions of the Missionary Society to the year 1817. Vol. IV (1808-1817). London: Williams and Co.; and J. Nisbet. OCLC 416654715.
- London Missionary Society (1953a). South Seas journals content list, 1796 - 1899. Records of the London Missionary Society (as filmed by the AJCP) [microform] : [M1-M116, M608-M670] 1795-1825 [i.e. 1795-1925]/Series. Contents lists/File 1/South Seas journals. Canberra: National Library Australia.
- London Missionary Society (1953b). South Seas letters content list, 1796 - 1899. Records of the London Missionary Society (as filmed by the AJCP) [microform] : [M1-M116, M608-M670] 1795-1825 [i.e. 1795-1925]/Series. Contents lists/File 7/South Seas letters. Canberra: National Library Australia.
- Lovett, Richard (1899). The history of the London Missionary Society, 1795-1895. Vol. 1. London: H. Frowde. OCLC 690759506.
- Martin, Henry Byam (1981). The Polynesian Journal of Captain Henry Byam Martin, R. N. (PDF). Canberra: Australian National University Press. hdl:1885/114833. ISBN 978-0-7081-1609-8. OCLC 8329030.
- Matsuda, Matt K. (2005). "Society Islands: Tahitian Archives". Empire of Love: Histories of France and the Pacific. New York: Oxford University Press. pp. 91–112. ISBN 978-0-19-534747-0. OCLC 191036857.
- McCormick, Eric H. (2013) [1977]. Omai Pacific Envoy. Auckland: Auckland University Press. OCLC 865331287.
- Moerenhout, Jacques Antoine (1837a). Voyages aux îles du Grand Océan (in French). Vol. 1. Paris: Arthur Bertrand. OCLC 15105380.
- Moerenhout, Jacques Antoine (1837b). Voyages aux îles du Grand Océan (in French). Vol. 2. Paris: Arthur Bertrand. OCLC 15105380.
- Moerenhout, Jacques Antoine; Borden, Arthur R. (1993). Travels to the islands of the Pacific Ocean. Lanham, MD: University Press of America. ISBN 978-0-8191-8898-4. OCLC 26503299.
- Morisson, James; Gibbings, Robert; Rutter, Owen (1935). The journal of James Morrison, boatswain's mate of the Bounty : describing the mutiny & subsequent misfortunes of the mutineers : together with an account of the Island of Tahiti... Golden Cockerel Press. OCLC 562418811.
- Mortimer, Favell Lee (1838). The Night of Toil; or, A Familiar Account of the Labors of the First Missionaries in the South Sea Islands (1 ed.). London: J. Hatchard & Son. OCLC 752899081.
- Mortimer, George (1791). Observations and remarks made during a voyage to the islands of Teneriffe, Amsterdam, Maria's Islands ... Tinian, and from thence to Canton, in the brig Mercury, commanded by John Henry Cox, ... By Lieut. George Mortimer, ... 1791. London: T. Cadell; J. Robson; J. Sewell. pp. 22–50. OCLC 85890211.
- Newbury, Colin W. (1967a). "Aspects of Cultural Change in French Polynesia: The Decline of the Ari'i". The Journal of the Polynesian Society. 76 (1). Wellington: The Polynesian Society: 7–26. JSTOR 20704439. OCLC 6015277685.
- Newbury, Colin W.; Darling, Adam J. (1967b). "Te Hau Pahu Rahi: Pomare II and the Concept of Interisland Government in Eastern Polynesia". The Journal of the Polynesian Society. 76 (4). Wellington: The Polynesian Society: 477–514. JSTOR 20704508. OCLC 6015244633.
- Newbury, Colin W. (March 1973). "Resistance and Collaboration in French Polynesia: the Tahitian War: 1844–7". The Journal of the Polynesian Society. 82 (1). Wellington: The Polynesian Society: 5–27. JSTOR 20704899. OCLC 5544738080.
- Newbury, Colin W. (1980). Tahiti Nui: Change and Survival in French Polynesia, 1767–1945 (PDF). Honolulu: University Press of Hawaii. hdl:10125/62908. ISBN 978-0-8248-8032-3. OCLC 1053883377.
- Newbury, Colin W. (September 2009). "Pacts, Alliances and Patronage: Modes of Influence and Power in the Pacific". The Journal of Pacific History. 44 (2). Canberra: Australian National University: 141–162. doi:10.1080/00223340903142108. JSTOR 40346712. OCLC 4648099874. S2CID 142362747.
- Nicole, Jacques (2017) [1988]. Au pied de l'écriture. Histoire de la traduction de la bible en tahitien (in French). Papeete: Haere Pō. ISBN 979-10-90158-33-7. OCLC 1410863429.
- Oliver, Douglas L. (1974). Ancient Tahitian Society. Honolulu: University of Hawaii Press. doi:10.2307/j.ctvp2n5ds. hdl:1885/114907. ISBN 978-0-8248-8453-6. OCLC 1126284798. S2CID 165869849.
- O'Reilly, Patrick; Teissier, Raoul (1962). Tahitiens: répertoire bio-bibliographique de la Polynésie française (1st ed.). Paris: Musée de l'homme. OCLC 1001078211.
- Orsmond, John Muggridge; Smith, S. Percy (1893). "The Genealogy of the Pomare Family of Tahiti, from the Papers of the Rev. J. M. Orsmond. With Notes Thereon by S. Percy Smith". The Journal of the Polynesian Society. 2 (1). Wellington: The Polynesian Society: 25–43. ISSN 0032-4000. JSTOR 20701269. OCLC 9973508189.
- Perkins, Edward T. (1854). Na Motu, or, Reef-Rovings in the South Seas: a Narrative of Adventures at the Hawaiian, Georgian and Society Islands. New York: Pudney & Russell. ISBN 9785870949536. OCLC 947055236.
- Phillip, Arthur (1789). The Voyage of Governor Phillip to Botany Bay. London: John Stockdale. pp. 230–243. OCLC 758727395.
- Pichevin, Bernard (2010). "E parau no te tupuna o te mau arii no Raiatea". Bulletin de la Société des Études Océaniennes (in French) (318). Papeete: Société des Études Océaniennes.
- Pichevin, Bernard (2013). Généalogies et Histoire de Tahiti et des îles de la Société (in French). Pirae: Au vent des îles. ISBN 978-2-36734-008-1. OCLC 877916677.
- Pōmare II (July 1812). "Translation of a Letter from Pomarre, King of Otaheite, to the Rev. W. Henry, one of the Missionaries who had long resided on that Island, and who has, with several others, lately returned to it". The Evangelical Magazine and Missionary Chronicle. London: Williams and Son. pp. 281–282. OCLC 682032291.
- Pōmare II (1819). "Translation Of A Letter From Pomare, King of Otaheite, &c. To Mr. John Eyre, At Paramatta". The American Baptist Magazine, and Missionary Intelligencer. Vol. 2. Boston: James Loring, and Lincoln & Edmands. pp. 69–70. OCLC 1047669001.
- Pritchard, George (1983). The Aggressions of the French at Tahiti: And Other Islands in the Pacific. Oxford: Oxford University Press. ISBN 978-0-19-647994-1. OCLC 10470657.
- Pritchard, George (1878). Queen Pomare and Her Country. London: Elliot Stock. OCLC 663667911.
- Religious Tract Society (Great Britain) (1835). Missionary records. Tahiti and Society Islands (2nd ed.). London: The Religious Tract Society, instituted 1799. pp. 315–316. OCLC 428431716.
- Rey-Lescure, Philippe (1946). "La coutume du Tavau : le Tavau à Moorea et aux îles sous le vent". Bulletin de la Société des Études Océaniennes (in French) (76). Papeete: Société des Études Océaniennes: 196–205.
- Rey-Lescure, Philippe (1948a). "Documents pour servir à l'histoire de Tahiti : Séjour de Pomare II aux îles sous le vent du 3 septembre 1814 au 2 décembre 1814. Incident du navire Mathilda (document non daté ni signé)". Bulletin de la Société des Études Océaniennes (in French) (82). Papeete: Société des Études Océaniennes: 418–422.
- Rey-Lescure, Philippe (1948b). "Documents pour servir à l'histoire de Tahiti". Bulletin de la Société des Études Océaniennes (in French) (83). Le séjour forcé de 3 mois de Pomare II aux îles sous le vent jusqu'au retour à Mo'orea le 2 décembre 1814 (incident navire Matilda emporté par le vent le 3 septembre 1814). L'allégeance des îles sous le vent, puis de Raivavae à Pomare II. L'allégeance renouvelée des ISLV à Pomare IV en 1830. L'imposition d'une restriction sur le commerce du porc par Pomare II aux ISLV en 1821. Le conflit entre Tamatoa III poussé par les missionnaires et Pomare II à ce sujet en 1820. Le couronnement de Pomare III en 1824. Le conflit de Raiatea concernant l'île de Taha'a entre Tapoa II soutenu par Tefaaora II et Mai III, et Tamatoa III Tapa puis Tamatoa IV Moeore (26 mai 1831 - 3 avril 1832). Le pavillon de la reine Pomare IV source de conflits. Papeete: Société des Études Océaniennes: 461–462.
- Richards, Rhys (June 2005). "Manuscript XVII: Who Taught Pomare to Read? Unpublished Comments by a Missionary Surgeon on Tahiti in May 1807 to October 1810, and Journal Entries by an Able Seaman at Tahiti in 1811". The Journal of Pacific History. 40 (1). Canberra: Australian National University: 105–115. doi:10.1080/00223340500082467. JSTOR 25169732. OCLC 6015502414. S2CID 219625801.
- Robineau, Claude (1984). Tradition et modernité aux îles de la Société / Livre 1, Du coprah à l'atome (PDF) (in French). Paris: ORSTOM. ISBN 2-7099-0686-4. OCLC 715748479.
- Robineau, Claude (1985). Tradition et modernité aux îles de la Société/ Livre 2, Les racines (PDF) (in French). Paris: ORSTOM. ISBN 2-7099-0687-2. OCLC 30534343.
- Salmon, Alexandre (1964). Alexandre Salmon (1820-1866) et sa femme Ariitaimai (1821-1897) : deux figures de Tahiti à l'époque du Protectorat (in French). Paris: Société des Océanistes. doi:10.4000/books.sdo.777. ISBN 978-2-85430-089-5. OCLC 6014637505.
- Salmon, Marau Taaroa (1971). Mémoires de Marau Taaroa, dernière reine de Tahiti (in French). Translated by Pomare, Ariimanihinihi Takau. Paris: Société des Océanistes. doi:10.4000/books.sdo.227. ISBN 978-2-85430-098-7. OCLC 6014637035.
- Salmon, Tati (1904). The history of the island of Borabora and genealogy of our family from Marae Vaiotaha. FamilySearch International. OCLC 866022587.
- Salmon, Tati (1923). Society Island notes, historical and genealogical. "Tati Salmon's Notes". FamilySearch International. OCLC 866048204.
- Salmon, Tati (1951) [1904]. "L'histoire de Borabora et la généalogie de notre famille du marae Vaiotaha, par Tati Salmon". Bulletin de la Société des Études Océaniennes (in French) (97). Translated by De Robillard, H. Papeete: Société des Études Océaniennes: 315–330.
- Salmond, Anne (2009). Aphrodite's Island: The European Discovery of Tahiti. Berkeley: University of California Press. ISBN 978-0-520-26114-3. OCLC 317461764.
- Saura, Bruno; Millaud, Hiriata; Daubard, Patrick Matari'i (2000). Histoire et traditions de Huahine et Pora Pora. Cahiers du patrimoine (in French and Tahitian). Vol. 1. The author of the original manuscript in tahitian dated 1846, is unknown. Papeete: Ministère de la Culture de Polynésie française. OCLC 492654325.
- Saura, Bruno (2005). Huahine aux temps anciens. Cahiers du patrimoine (in French and Tahitian). Vol. 8. Papeete: Service de la Culture et du Patrimoine de la Polynésie française. ISBN 978-2-9124-0902-7. OCLC 493919438.
- Saura, Bruno; Millaud, Hiriata (2003). La lignée royale des Tama-toa de Ra'iātea (Îles-sous-le-Vent). Cahiers du patrimoine (in French and Tahitian). Vol. 5. The author of the original manuscript in tahitian written in circa 1878, is unknown. Papeete: Ministère de la Culture de Polynésie française. OCLC 492882499.
- Sissons, Jeffrey (November 2008). "Heroic History and Chiefly Chapels in 19th Century Tahiti". Oceania. 78 (3). Sydney: Wiley for Oceania Publications, University of Sydney: 320–331. doi:10.1002/j.1834-4461.2008.tb00044.x. JSTOR 40495590. OCLC 5154119332.
- Sissons, Jeffrey (November 2011). "History as Sacrifice: The Polynesian Iconoclasm". Oceania. 81 (3). Sydney: Wiley for Oceania Publications, University of Sydney: 302–315. doi:10.1002/j.1834-4461.2011.tb00110.x. JSTOR 23209537. OCLC 5156601630.
- Sissons, Jeffrey (2014). The Polynesian Iconoclasm: Religious Revolution and the Seasonality of Power. New York: Berghahn Books. ISBN 978-1-78238-414-4. JSTOR j.ctt9qcvw9. OCLC 885451227.
- Smith, Thomas (1825). The History and Origin of the Missionary Societies, Etc. (Appendix.). London. OCLC 1063996422.
- Smith, Vanessa; Thomas, Nicholas; Nuku, Maia (2013). Mutiny and aftermath : James Morrison's account of the mutiny on the Bounty and the island of Tahiti. Honolulu: University of Hawaii Press. ISBN 978-0-8248-3676-4. OCLC 10015903417.
- Stevenson, Karen; Rousseau, Cécile (1982). Artifacts of the Pomare Family. Honolulu: University of Hawaii Commons Gallery, Punaauia : Le musée de Tahiti et des îles, 1981. OCLC 490711845.
- Stevenson, Karen (June 2014). "ʻAimata, Queen Pomare IV: Thwarting Adversity in Early 19th Century Tahiti". The Journal of the Polynesian Society. 123 (2). Wellington: The Polynesian Society: 129–144. doi:10.15286/jps.123.2.129-144. JSTOR 43286236. OCLC 906004458.
- Stewart, Charles Samuel (1832). A Visit to the South Seas, in the U.S. Ship Vincennes, During the Years 1829 and 1830: With Notices of Brazil, Peru, Manilla, the Cape of Good Hope, and St. Helena. Vol. 1. London: Fisher, Son, & Jackson. OCLC 1021222101.
- Tefaaora III (1951). "Document du 4 octobre 1845 fourni par Tefaaora, prince de Borabora, sur le Gouvernement des Iles Sous-le-Vent". Bulletin de la Société des Études Océaniennes (in French) (97). Translated by Robillard, H. de. Papeete: Société des Études Océaniennes: 306–307.
- Teissier, Raoul (1978). "Chefs et notables des Établissements Français de l'Océanie au temps du protectorat: 1842–1850". Bulletin de la Société des Études Océaniennes (202). Papeete: Société des Études Océaniennes. OCLC 9510786.
- Temaeva, Auguste (1928). "Compte rendu de la troisième fête du folklore tahitien: discours de M. Temaeva". Bulletin de la Société des Études Océaniennes (in French) (27). Papeete: Société des Études Océaniennes: 121–123.
- The Evangelical Magazine (1805). "The Evangelical Magazine, 1805". London: T. Williams and Co. OCLC 503959677.
- The Evangelical Magazine (1811). "The Evangelical Magazine, 1811". London: T. Williams. OCLC 503959677.
- The Evangelical Magazine (1812). "The Evangelical Magazine, 1812". London: Williams and Son. OCLC 503959677.
- The Evangelical Magazine and Missionary Chronicle (October 1816). "South Sea Mission". The Evangelical Magazine and Missionary Chronicle. London: Williams and Son. pp. 405–409. OCLC 682032291.
- The Evangelical Magazine and Missionary Chronicle (1818). "The Evangelical Magazine and Missionary Chronicle 1818". Vol. 26. London: Francis Westley. OCLC 880586279.
- Thomson, Robert (1851). History of Tahiti, 1767-1815 (3 volumes), [incomplete]. Records of the London Missionary Society (as filmed by the AJCP) [microform] : [M1-M116, M608-M670] 1795-1825 [i.e. 1795-1925]/Series. Memoirs and histories. Canberra: National Library Australia.
- Turnbull, John (1813) [1805]. A voyage round the world, in the years 1800, 1801, 1802, 1803, and 1804 (Second ed.). London: W. McDowall for A. Maxwell. OCLC 1040204669.
- Tyerman, Daniel; Bennet, George (1832a). Journal of voyages and travels by the Rev. Daniel Tyerman and George Bennet, esq. [...] between the years 1821 and 1829 [...] From the 1st London ed., rev. by an American editor. Vol. 1. Boston: Crocker and Brewster. OCLC 847088.
- Tyerman, Daniel; Bennet, George (1832b). Journal of voyages and travels by the Rev. Daniel Tyerman and George Bennet, esq. [...] between the years 1821 and 1829 [...] From the 1st London ed., rev. by an American editor. Vol. 2. Boston & New York: Crocker and Brewster & Jonathan Leawitt. OCLC 847088.
- Vancouver, George (1798a). A voyage of discovery to the North Pacific ocean, and round the world [...] performed in the years 1790, 1791, 1792, 1793, 1794, and 1795, in the Discovery sloop of war, and armed tender Chatham, under the command of Captain George Vancouver. Vol. 1. London: Printed for G.G. and J. Robinson [etc.] OCLC 1102097044.
- Vancouver, George (1798b). A voyage of discovery to the North Pacific ocean, and round the world [...] performed in the years 1790, 1791, 1792, 1793, 1794, and 1795, in the Discovery sloop of war, and armed tender Chatham, under the command of Captain George Vancouver. Vol. 2. London: Printed for G.G. and J. Robinson [etc.] OCLC 1102097044.
- Vardy, J.L. (1799). "Copy of diary of J.L Vardy, Missionary on board the Duff on her second voyage with Missionaries for the South Seas, 1798. 19 December 1798 – 05 February 1799". Records of the London Missionary Society (as filmed by the AJCP) [microform] : [M1-M116, M608-M670] 1795-1825 [i.e. 1795-1925]/Series. South Seas journals/File 5A (Box 1)/J.L. Vardy, on board the Duff (typescript). Canberra: National Library of Australia.
- Wharton, Leonard C.; Im Thurn, Everard (1925). The journal of William Lockerby, sandalwood trader in the Fijian Islands during the years 1808-1809. London: The Hakluyt Society. OCLC 63370530.
- Williams, John (1837). A narrative of missionary enterprises in the South Sea Islands : with remarks upon the natural history of the islands, origin, languages, traditions, and usages of the inhabitants. (590 pages). London: J. Snow. OCLC 1391739742.
- Williams, John (1840). A narrative of missionary enterprises in the South Sea Islands : with remarks upon the natural history of the islands, origin, languages, traditions, and usages of the inhabitants. (154 pages). London: J. Snow. OCLC 1049888888.
- Wilson, James (1799). A missionary voyage to the southern Pacific ocean, performed in the years 1796, 1797, 1798, in the ship Duff, commanded by Captain James Wilson. London: T. Chapman. OCLC 1049640919.

Regnal titles
Preceded by Pōmare I	King of Tahiti; 1791–1821	Succeeded by Pōmare III
