= Pōmare I =

King of Tahiti from 1788 to 1791

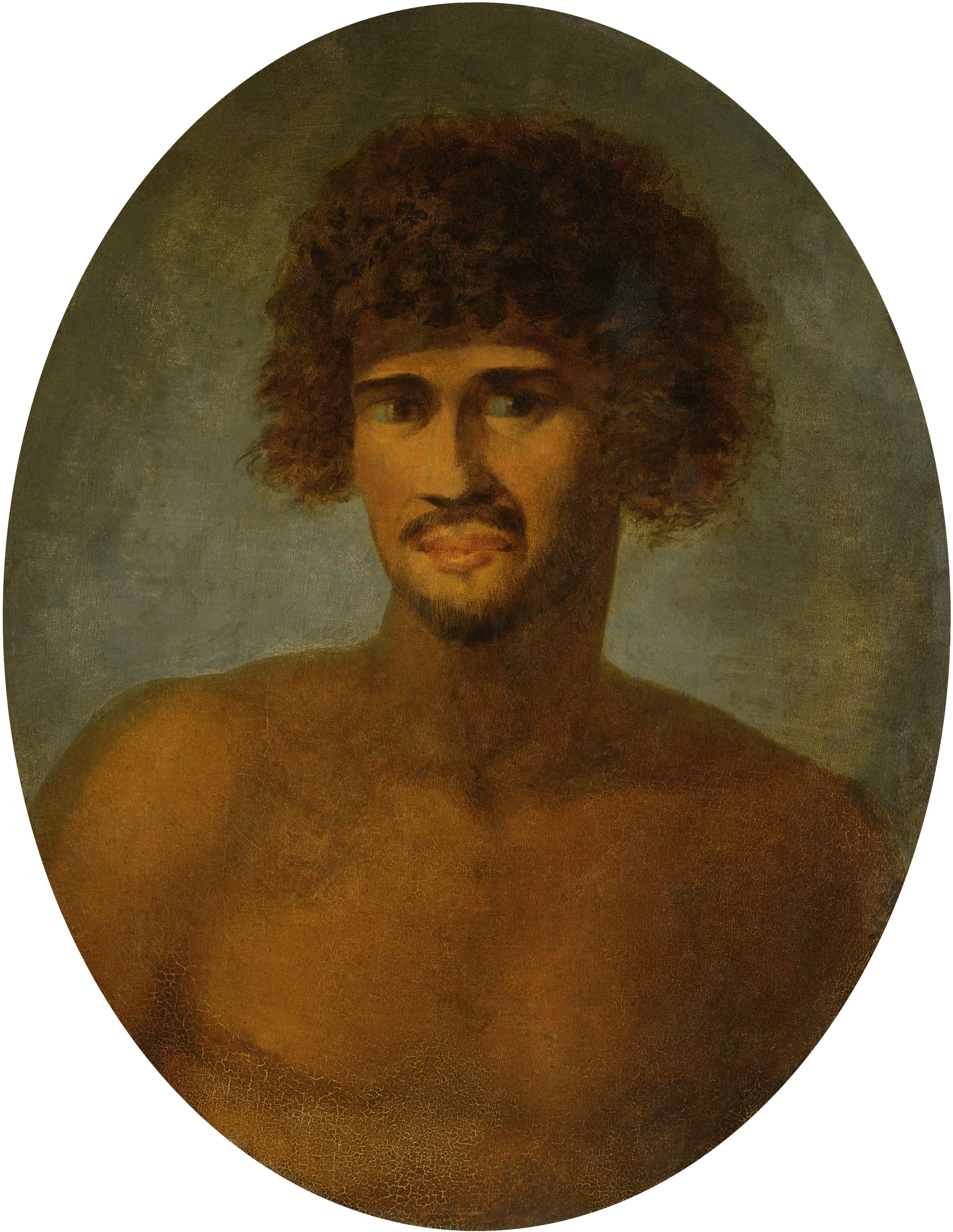
- Painting of Pōmare I by John Webber

King of Tahiti
- Reign: 1788 – 13 February 1791
- Predecessor: Inaugural
- Successor: Pōmare II
- Born: Tunuiea’aiteatua Vaira’atoa Taina c. 1753; Pare, Tahiti
- Died: September 3, 1803; Matavai, Tahiti
- Burial: Pōmare Royal Cemetery, Papaʻoa, ʻArue
- Spouse: Itia Tetuanuireia ite ra’i atea Vairiti Pateamai Teano; Pipiri (junior wife)
- Issue: Teri’inavahoroa v. Pōmare II; Teri’itapunui Vehiatua VIII; Teheimaitua v. Oroho
- House: House of Pōmare
- Father: Teu Tunuieaite Atua
- Mother: Tetupaia i Hauiri
- Religion: Tahitian

Pōmare I (c. 1753 – September 3, 1803) (fully in old orthography: Tu-nui-ea-i-te-atua-i-Tarahoi Vaira'atoa Taina Pōmare I; also known as Tu or Tinah or Outu, or more formally as Tu-nui-e-a'a-i-te-atua) was the unifier and first king of Tahiti and founder of the Pōmare dynasty and the Kingdom of Tahiti between 1788 and 1791. He abdicated in 1791 but remained in power as the guardian regent during the minority of his successor Pōmare II from 1791 until 1803. He is best known in the western world for being the ruler of Tahiti during the mutiny on the Bounty in 1789.

== Name ==
Outu is the phonetic English rendering of ʻO Tū, Tū being the name, ʻo the nominal predicate meaning that is. Older literature writes his family name as Tunuieaiteatua, which leaves incertainties about the proper pronunciation as Tahitian usually did (and does) not write macrons and glottals. Barring this incertainty, in the current proper orthography would be Tū-nui-ʻēʻa-i-te-atua meaning Great-Tū,-road-to-the-god. Tū (standing straight up) was a major Tahitian god.

Missionary John Jefferson reported on May 28, 1799 that his title was 'Otoo. noo. ey tԑ а̄to'oа̄' (O Tū nui te atua), meaning 'The great Tu, the god.

Ariʻitaimai claims that this Tū is a contraction of atua (god), but that is unlikely. The name Pōmare was adopted later. Pō-mare means "night cougher", a nickname he took, as was common in that time, in honor of his daughter Princess Teri’inavahoroa who died from tuberculosis in 1792. Because of a Polynesian tradition of not saying the monarch's name in vain, "pō" and "mare" were replaced by "ruʻi" and "hota" respectively. Currently "ruʻi" is only used in the Bible, "pō" having become the standard word again.

== Biography ==
Tu was the son of Teu, chief of Pare-'Arue, and his wife, Tetupaia-i-Hauiri (Tetupaia). Tetupaia was the granddaughter of Tamatoa II of Raiatea. Tu's great uncle was Tutaha, who acted as his regent.

Born at Pare, ca. 1753, he initially reigned under the regency of his father and succeeded on the death of his father as Ariʻi-rahi of Porionuʻu on November 23, 1802. Pōmare further succeeded in uniting the different chiefdoms of Tahiti into a single kingdom, composed of the islands of Tahiti itself, Moʻorea, Mehetiʻa, and the Tetiʻaroa group. He thus became the first king of unified Tahiti in 1788.

One year into his reign as Tahiti's king, Pōmare hosted the crew of HMS Bounty who had visited Tahiti to collect breadfruit plants for transportation to the West Indies. The subsequent mutiny on the Bounty caused the mutineers to return briefly to Tahiti, where they were under Pōmare's protection, until leaving the island and eventually relocating to Pitcairn. A small number of mutineers stayed behind and were later located by HMS Pandora, to which Pōmare accepted British authority and allowed the mutineers to be arrested and taken back to England for trial.

Pōmare's service as the first king of unified Tahiti ended when he abdicated in 1791. He was succeeded by Tū Tūnuiʻēʻaiteatua Pōmare II, who reigned from 1791 until 1821: however, though no longer monarch, Pomare remained regent of Tahiti during the minority of Pomare II, from 1791 until 1803. In 1792, HMS Providence visited Tahiti and Pōmare was reunited with William Bligh, the victim of mutiny four years earlier. Bligh interviewed Pōmare regarding the mutineers and subsequently wrote an account of where he suspected the mutineers may have escaped to following their departure from Tahiti.

Pōmare married 4 times and had three sons and three daughters. He died from thrombosis.

== Portrayals ==
Due to Pōmare's role as King of Tahiti during the Mutiny on the Bounty, he has subsequently been portrayed in various dramatic films about the Bounty:

- In Mutiny on the Bounty (1935), based on Charles Nordhoff and James Norman Hall's "Bounty Trilogy" of novels, Pōmare is known as "Chief Hitihiti" and is played by Tahitian actor Bill Bambridge.
- In Mutiny on the Bounty (1962), also based on the Bounty Trilogy, Pōmare (as "Hitihiti") is played by Matahiariʻi Tama.
- In The Bounty (1984), based on Richard Hough's non-fiction book Captain Bligh & Mr. Christian: The Men and the Mutiny, he is known as "King Tynah" and is portrayed by New Zealand actor Wi Kuki Kaa. Historically, Tynah may have been a different individual from Pōmare, as he is mentioned in the Bounty log as a "Paramount Chief", a title separate from monarch.

== Ancestry ==
Ancestors of Pōmare I

8. Teuruari’i
4. Tumoehania
9. Marurai
2. Teu Tu nui e ai te atua
10. Vehiatua i te mata’i
5. Tetuahuria
1. Pōmare I
12. Teri’ivetearai Rofa’i
6. Tamatoa II
13. Marama
3. Tetupaia i Hauiri
7. Maihe’a

Regnal titles
New title	King of Tahiti; 1788–1791	Succeeded by Pōmare II
