= List of dams and reservoirs in France =

This is a partial list of dams in France.

== Mainland ==
- Alrance Dam
- Lac d'Apremont
- Bissorte Dam
- Lac de la Cavayère
- Lac de Chambon
- Lac de Coiselet
- Donzère-Mondragon Dam
- Eguzon Dam
- Génissiat Dam
- Glanum Dam
- Grand'Maison Dam
- La Jourdanie Dam
- Bassin de Lampy
- Le Pouget Dam
- Le Truel Dam
- Malpasset Dam
- Marèges Dam
- Lac de Moron
- Pinet Dam
- Roselend Dam
- Bassin de Saint-Ferréol
- Étang de Saint-Quentin
- Lake Salagou
- Lac de Serre-Ponçon
- Sivens Dam
- Étang de Soulcem
- Tignes Dam
- Lac de Vassivière
- Lac du Verney
- Lac de Vouglans

== French Guiana ==
- Petit-Saut Dam

== French Polynesia ==
- Faatautia (Hita'a) Dam
- Tahinu Dam
- Tevaiohiro Dam
- Titaaviri Dam
- Vaihiria Dam
- Vaite Dam
- Vainavenave Dam
- Vaitapaa Dam
- Vaituoru Dam

== New Caledonia ==
- Néaoua Dam
- Tu Dam
- Yaté Dam
