= Hitiaʻa =

Hitiaʻa in Tahiti may be:

- Hitiaʻa O Te Ra
- Hitiaʻa (commune)
