= Taiarapu =

Taiarapu may refer to:

- Taiarapu, or Tahiti-Iti, the southeast portion of Tahiti, French Polynesia
- Taiarapu-Est, Tahiti, a commune
- Taiarapu-Ouest, Tahiti, a commune
