= Papenoo Hydroelectric Power Station =

- Country: France
- Location: Papenoo, Tahiti, French Polynesia
- Coordinates: 17°33′8.97″S 149°25′54.81″W
- Status: Operational
- Construction began: 1989
- Commission date: 1994
- Owner: Electricite de Tahiti SA

Power generation
- Units operational: 7 x 4 MW Pelton-type
- Nameplate capacity: 28 MW

The Papenoo Hydroelectric Power Station is located near the commune of Papenoo on the island Tahiti in the overseas country of France, French Polynesia. It has an installed capacity of 28 MW and was constructed between 1989 and 1994. The hydroelectric power station is owned by Electricite de Tahiti SA. It is the largest hydroelectric power station in Tahiti.

It uses water provided by five reservoirs high up in the Papenoo Valley, above the commune. Each reservoir is created on the Papenoo River or a tributary by an embankment dam. From highest in elevation to lowest; Vaitapaa Dam at 17°39′15.23″S 149°26′3.09″W, which lies at an elevation of 411 m (1,348 ft) above sea level, is 15 m (49 ft) tall. It withholds a reservoir of 8,000 m^{3} (6.5 acre⋅ft). Next, at an elevation of 400 m (1,300 ft), Tahinu Dam, at 17°39′9.26″S 149°27′4.23″W is 33 m (108 ft) high and withholds a larger reservoir of 1,500,000 m^{3} (1,200 acre⋅ft). It is the tallest dam in Tahiti. Moving down is Vainavenave Dam at 17°39′15.54″S 149°25′20.35″W which lies at 399 m (1,309 ft) above sea level, is 29 m (95 ft) tall, and withholds a reservoir of 150,000 m^{3} (120 acre⋅ft). Fourth down the valley is the Vaituoru Dam at an elevation of 200 m (660 ft) with a reservoir capacity of 100,000 m^{3} (81 acre⋅ft). It is located at 17°37′59.77″S 149°25′55.56″W. Finally is the Tevaiohiro Dam at 85 m (279 ft) above sea level with a reservoir volume of 150,000 m^{3} (120 acre⋅ft). It is located at 17°35′13.13″S 149°25′8.72″W.

Water from the reservoirs is sent to three separate power stations via 25.5 km (15.8 mi) of penstock. The power station highest in elevation, Papenoo 1 contains four 4 MW Pelton-turbine-generators and is located at 17°38′12.80″S 149°26′0.90″W. Next downstream is Papenoo 2 at 17°35′56.16″S 149°25′3.29″W which contains one 4 MW Pelton turbine-generators. Lastly, Papenoo 3 contains two 4 MW Pelton turbine-generators and is located at 17°33′9.02″S 149°25′54.90″W.

== See also ==
- Hitia'a Hydroelectric Power Station
