= Matavai =

Matavai may refer to:

- Matavai (Gagaʻifomauga), a village in Samoa
- Matavai Bay, Tahiti
- A.S. Matavai, a Tahitian football club
