= Hitia'a Hydroelectric Power Station =

- Country: France
- Location: Hitia'a, Tahiti, French Polynesia
- Coordinates: 17°37′29.38″S 149°18′20.52″W
- Status: Operational
- Construction began: 1983
- Commission date: 1988
- Owner: Electricite de Tahiti SA

Power generation
- Units operational: 1 x 300 kW, 1 x 140 kW, 1 x 100 kW, 1 x 1 MW, 2 x 3 MW Pelton-type
- Nameplate capacity: 7.54 MW

The Hitia'a Hydroelectric Power Station, also called Faatautia Hydroelectric Power Station, is located near the commune of Hitia'a on the island Tahiti in the overseas country of France, French Polynesia. It has an installed capacity of 7.54 MW and was constructed between 1983 and 1988. The hydroelectric power station is owned by Electricite de Tahiti SA.

It uses water provided by three reservoirs high up in the Faatautia Valley, above the commune. Each reservoir is created by an embankment dam. Hitia'a 2 Dam at 17°37′44.09″S 149°20′43.56″W, which lies at an elevation of 637 m (2,090 ft) above sea level, is 19 m (62 ft) tall. It withholds a reservoir of 110,000 m^{3} (89 acre⋅ft). Next, at an elevation of 530 m (1,740 ft), Hitia'a 3 Dam at 17°37′51.15″S 149°20′8.57″W is also 19 m (62 ft) high but withholds a larger reservoir of 600,000 m^{3} (490 acre⋅ft). Finally, Hitia'a 1 Dam at 17°37′36.18″S 149°20′11.74″W lies at 511 m (1,677 ft) above sea level, is 10 m (33 ft) tall, and withholds a reservoir of 11,000 m^{3} (8.9 acre⋅ft). Water from the reservoirs is sent to the power station via a 11.5 km (7.1 mi) long penstock. The power station contains an array of six Pelton turbine-generators which include a 300 kW, 140 kW, 100 kW, 1 MW and two 3 MW units.

== See also ==
- Papenoo Hydroelectric Power Station
