= Tepati =

- Village
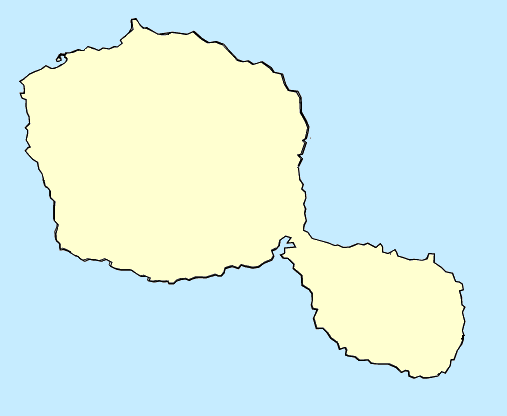
- Location in Tahiti
- Coordinates: 17°50′50″S 149°8′0″W
- Country: France; French Polynesia; Tahiti
- Commune: Taiarapu-Est
- District: Tautira
- Time zone: UTC-11 (French Polynesia Time)

Tepati is a beach village in Tautira District on the south coast of Tahiti.
