= Papenoʼo River =

Coordinates: 17.56°S 149.43°W

Location
- Country: French Polynesia

Physical characteristics
- Source
  - location: Center of Tahiti
  - elevation: 91 m (300 ft)
- Mouth
  - location: Northern Tahiti
  - elevation: 0.61 m (2 ft)
- Length: 20 mi (32 km)

The Papenoʼo (Papenoo) River is a river on the island of Tahiti in French Polynesia.

The river rises in the mountains of Tahiti east of the town center of Papeete and ends on the coast of Tahiti near Papenoo. It is about 32 km (20 mi) long and is about 3.0 m (10 ft) wide at the mouth. All the water ends in the Pacific Ocean. The river forms as a little trickle from the little snow melt of Mont Orohena in the center of Tahiti and flows northward toward Arue. As it flows north, it collects more and more snow melt. Eventually, it becomes a 3.0 m (10 ft) wide river 19 km (12 mi) south of the ocean. Once it reaches the Tahiti Freeway, it becomes a 6.1 m (20 ft) wide river. The river's highest elevation is 1,200 m (4,000 ft) in the mountains of Tahiti. The lowest elevation is 0.61 m (2 ft) once the Papenoo River meets the Pacific Ocean.

The river was previously called Vaituaru, "the stream that destroys everything in its path".

== See also ==
- List of rivers of Oceania
