= Tiarei =

Tiʻarei
- Associated commune of Hitia'a O Te Ra
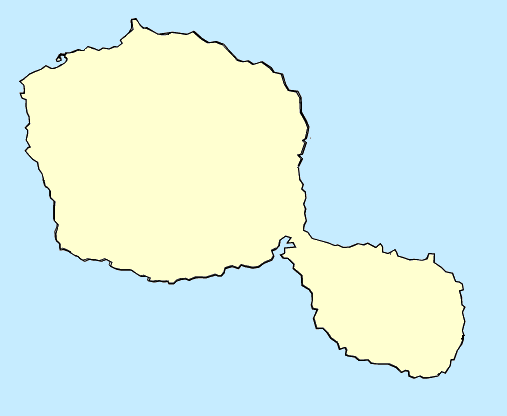
- Location within Tahiti
- Location of Tiʻarei
- Coordinates: 17°32′40″S 149°20′32″W
- Country: France
- Overseas collectivity: French Polynesia
- Commune: Hitia'a O Te Ra
- Population (2022): 2,975
- Time zone: UTC−10:00

Tiʻarei is an associated commune on the island of Tahiti, in French Polynesia. It is the administrative centre of the commune of Hitiaʻa O Te Ra.

Tiarei features:

Arahoho Blowhole (Le trou souffleur d'Arahoho)

Faʻarumaʻi Waterfalls (Cascades de Faarumai)
