= 1940 French Oceanian referendum =

An unofficial referendum on whether to support the Free French or the Vichy régime was held in the French Oceanian islands of Moʼorea and Tahiti on 24 August 1940. The referendum was held following a call from Charles de Gaulle to oppose the Vichy government on 18 June, and was organised by the underground Free France Committee.

Over 99% of voters supported backing Free France, with just 18 people voting in favour of the Vichy régime. Following the referendum, the pro-Vichy governor Frédéric Chastenet de Géry was forced to resign on 2 September. On the same day the Free French Committee formed the Provisional Council of Oceania to rule the island group, which was recognised by de Gaulle by a telegram sent from London. Peter Fraser, the Prime Minister of New Zealand also sent a telegram noting great satisfaction at the result. The new administration on the islands lifted the ban on British shipping, allowing imports of food. Only French citizens were eligible to vote in the referendum, meaning the overwhelming majority of the population on both islands was excluded from participation, including almost the entire native population.

== Results ==
Choice	Votes	%
Free French Forces	5,564	99.68
Against	18	0.32
Total	5,582	100.00
Source: Direct Democracy
