= Afatauri =

Village in Tahiti, French Polynesia

Coordinates: 17°47′15″S 149°7′50″W

Afatauri is a beach village on the south-east coast of Tahiti.

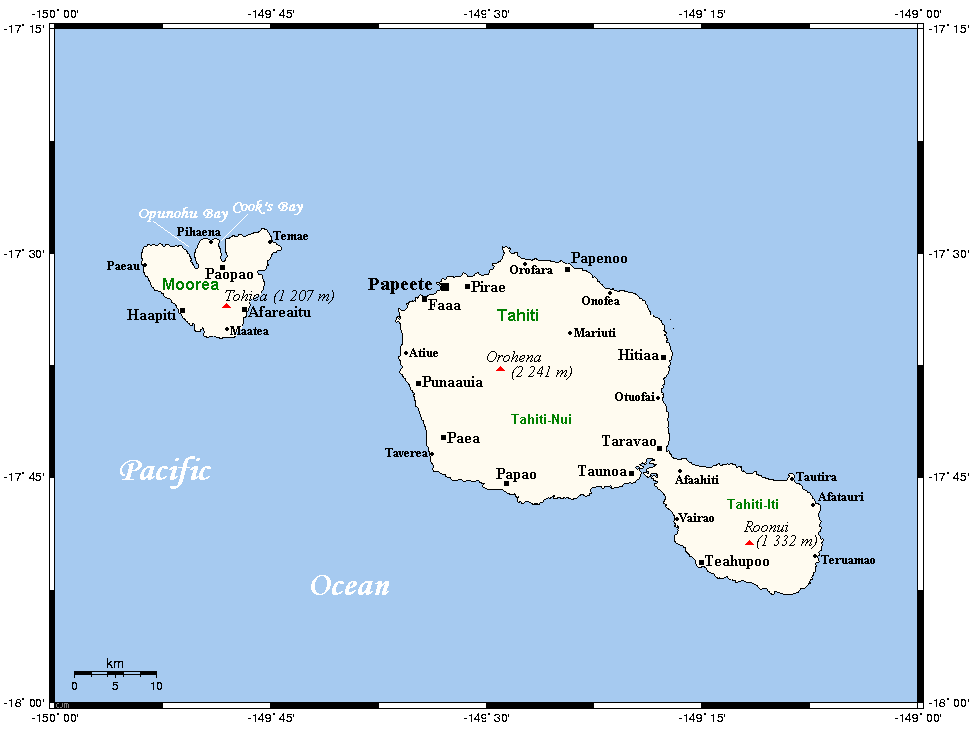
Afatauri beach is located on the south-east coast of Tahiti
