= Mount Ronui =

Shield volcano in French Polynesia

Highest point
- Elevation: 1,332 m (4,370 ft)
- Prominence: 1,319 m (4,327 ft)
- Listing: Ribu
- Coordinates: 17.822767°S 149.215352°W

Geography
- Location: Tahiti

Geology
- Last eruption: Unknown

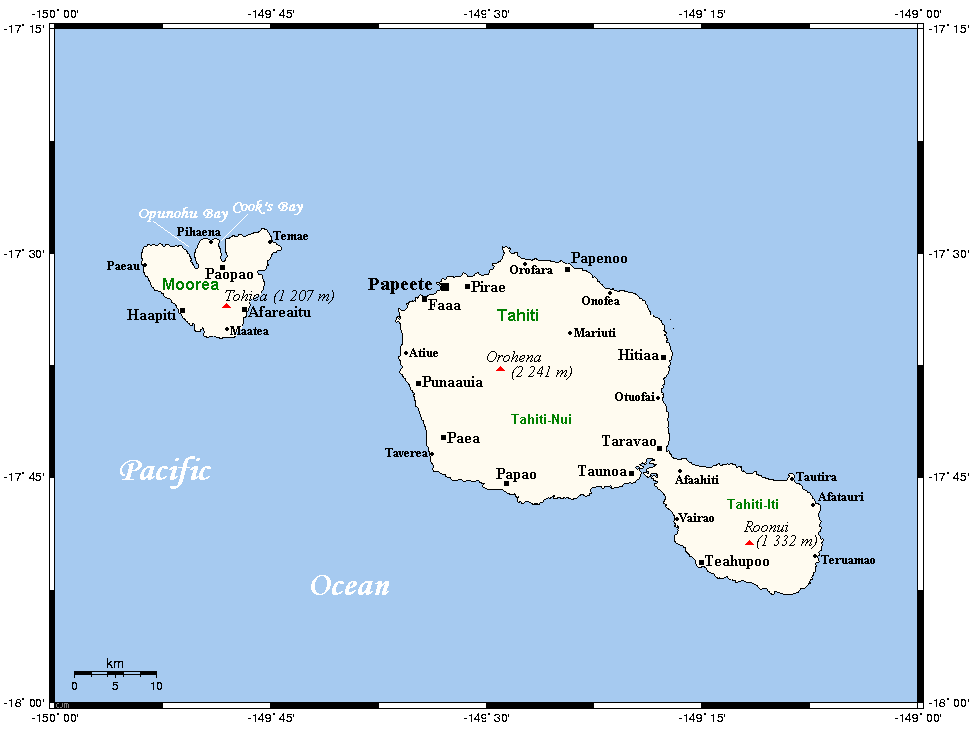
Mount Ronui (labeled Roonui) is located in southern Tahiti.

Mount Ronui (also Roniu, Roonui and Rooniu) is a shield volcano of 1332m (or 1321m) in Tahiti Iti, which is the south-eastern part of Tahiti in French Polynesia in the south Pacific. It is one of the principal peaks on the island and the highest in Tahiti Iti.

It is one of three volcanoes to which the formation of Tahiti is attributed.
