= Taiʻarapu-Est =

Commune in French Polynesia, France

- Commune
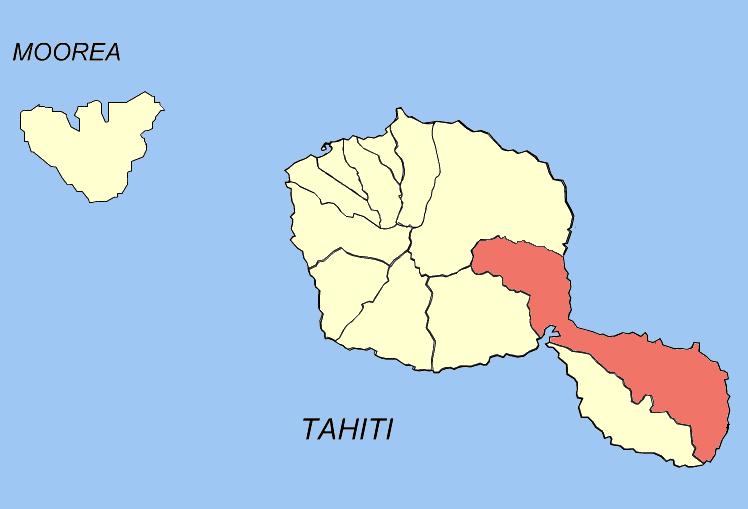
- Location of the commune (in red) within the Windward Islands. The island of Meheti'a lies outside of the map.
- Location of Taiʻarapu-Est
- Coordinates: 17°42′12″S 149°20′00″W
- Country: France
- Overseas collectivity: French Polynesia
- Subdivision: Windward Islands

Government
  - Mayor (2020–2026): Anthony Jamet
- Area^{1}: 218.3 km^{2} (84.3 sq mi)
- Highest elevation: 1,306 m (4,285 ft)
- Lowest elevation: 0 m (0 ft)
- Population (2022): 13,602
  - Density: 62.31/km^{2} (161.4/sq mi)
- Time zone: UTC−10:00
- INSEE/Postal code: 98747 /98719
- ^{1} French Land Register data, which excludes lakes, ponds, glaciers > 1 km^{2} (0.386 sq mi or 247 acres) and river estuaries.

Taiʻarapu-Est (literally "Tai'arapu East") is a commune of French Polynesia, an overseas territory of France in the Pacific Ocean. The commune of Taiʻarapu-Est is located on the island of Tahiti, in the administrative subdivision of the Windward Islands, themselves part of the Society Islands At the 2022 census it had a population of 13,602. The whole island of Mehetia is part of the commune.

== Population ==
Historical population
Year	Pop.	±%
2002	10,427	—
2007	11,549	+10.8%
2012	12,253	+6.1%
2017	12,701	+3.7%
2022	13,602	+7.1%

== Overview ==
The commune extends over a part of Tahiti Nui ("big Tahiti") and half of the peninsula of Tahiti Iti ("small Tahiti", aka Taiʻarapu). The commune also includes the uninhabited island of Mehetia (2.3 km^{2}/0.9 sq. miles), located 112 kilometres (70 mi) east of Tahiti Iti.

Taʻiarapu-Est consists of the following associated communes:

- Afaʻahiti
- Faʻaone
- Pueu
- Tautira

The administrative centre of the commune is the settlement of Afaʻahiti.

== Climate ==
Climate data for Taiarapu-Est (1991–2020 normals, extremes 1981–2010)
Month	Jan	Feb	Mar	Apr	May	Jun	Jul	Aug	Sep	Oct	Nov	Dec	Year
Mean daily maximum °C (°F)	29.9 (85.8)	30.2 (86.4)	30.4 (86.7)	29.9 (85.8)	29.0 (84.2)	28.0 (82.4)	27.5 (81.5)	27.5 (81.5)	27.6 (81.7)	28.1 (82.6)	29.0 (84.2)	29.6 (85.3)	28.9 (84.0)
Daily mean °C (°F)	27.0 (80.6)	27.2 (81.0)	27.3 (81.1)	27.0 (80.6)	26.3 (79.3)	25.4 (77.7)	25.0 (77.0)	24.8 (76.6)	25.0 (77.0)	25.4 (77.7)	26.3 (79.3)	26.7 (80.1)	26.1 (79.0)
Mean daily minimum °C (°F)	24.1 (75.4)	24.2 (75.6)	24.3 (75.7)	24.1 (75.4)	23.6 (74.5)	22.9 (73.2)	22.4 (72.3)	22.1 (71.8)	22.4 (72.3)	22.8 (73.0)	23.5 (74.3)	23.8 (74.8)	23.3 (73.9)
Average precipitation mm (inches)	367.0 (14.45)	294.2 (11.58)	304.2 (11.98)	269.9 (10.63)	307.1 (12.09)	219.4 (8.64)	177.0 (6.97)	121.2 (4.77)	184.3 (7.26)	263.4 (10.37)	306.1 (12.05)	420.9 (16.57)	3,234.7 (127.35)
Average precipitation days (≥ 1.0 mm)	23.0	20.0	20.3	17.6	15.9	15.6	15.0	12.7	14.8	16.7	18.9	21.7	212.1
Source: World Meteorological Organization

== See also ==
- Afatauri
- Tepati
