= Afaʻahiti =

ʻĀfaʻahiti
- Associated commune of Taiarapu-Est
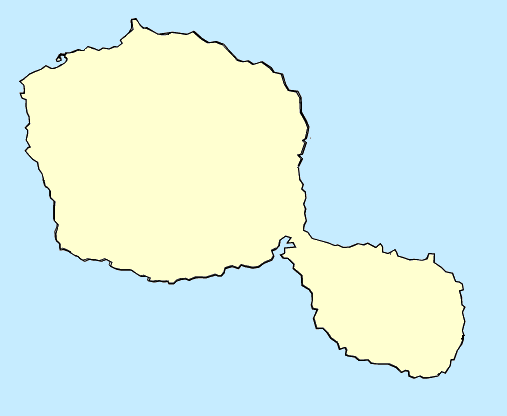
- Location within Tahiti
- Location of ʻĀfaʻahiti
- Location within France
- Coordinates: 17°44′10″S 149°18′30″W
- Country: France
- Overseas collectivity: French Polynesia
- Commune: Taiarapu-Est
- Population (2022): 6,829
- Time zone: UTC−10:00

ʻĀfaʻahiti is a village and associated commune in Tahiti. It is located on Tahiti Iti (little Tahiti) close to the Taravao isthmus, which connects Tahiti Nui (big Tahiti) to Tahiti Iti. The area is rural with many small villages. The official languages are French and Tahitian. The currency is the Pacific franc (XPF). Population as of 2022 was 6,829. Tahiti's west coast freeway runs nearby the commune. The Faaa International Airport is another way to transport in ʻĀfaʻahiti.

== Geography ==
=== Climate ===
ʻĀfaʻahiti has a tropical rainforest climate (Köppen climate classification Af). The average annual temperature in ʻĀfaʻahiti is 23.2 °C (73.8 °F). The average annual rainfall is 3,374.7 mm (132.86 in) with January as the wettest month. The temperatures are highest on average in March, at around 24.5 °C (76.1 °F), and lowest in August, at around 21.8 °C (71.2 °F). The highest temperature ever recorded in ʻĀfaʻahiti was 34.2 °C (93.6 °F) on 7 March 1979; the coldest temperature ever recorded was 12.0 °C (53.6 °F) on 2 July 1984.

Climate data for ʻĀfaʻahiti (1991–2020 normals, extremes 1968−present)
Month	Jan	Feb	Mar	Apr	May	Jun	Jul	Aug	Sep	Oct	Nov	Dec	Year
Record high °C (°F)	32.5 (90.5)	32.5 (90.5)	34.2 (93.6)	32.0 (89.6)	32.0 (89.6)	31.0 (87.8)	30.3 (86.5)	29.8 (85.6)	31.0 (87.8)	30.7 (87.3)	32.0 (89.6)	31.0 (87.8)	34.2 (93.6)
Mean daily maximum °C (°F)	27.3 (81.1)	27.6 (81.7)	27.9 (82.2)	27.6 (81.7)	26.8 (80.2)	25.9 (78.6)	25.5 (77.9)	25.3 (77.5)	25.4 (77.7)	26.0 (78.8)	26.6 (79.9)	26.8 (80.2)	26.6 (79.9)
Daily mean °C (°F)	24.1 (75.4)	24.3 (75.7)	24.5 (76.1)	24.2 (75.6)	23.4 (74.1)	22.5 (72.5)	22.0 (71.6)	21.8 (71.2)	22.1 (71.8)	22.5 (72.5)	23.3 (73.9)	23.7 (74.7)	23.2 (73.8)
Mean daily minimum °C (°F)	20.8 (69.4)	21.0 (69.8)	21.1 (70.0)	20.9 (69.6)	20.0 (68.0)	19.1 (66.4)	18.5 (65.3)	18.2 (64.8)	18.7 (65.7)	19.1 (66.4)	20.0 (68.0)	20.6 (69.1)	19.8 (67.6)
Record low °C (°F)	16.2 (61.2)	16.5 (61.7)	15.5 (59.9)	15.5 (59.9)	14.9 (58.8)	12.0 (53.6)	12.0 (53.6)	13.0 (55.4)	12.3 (54.1)	13.4 (56.1)	14.0 (57.2)	15.0 (59.0)	12.0 (53.6)
Average precipitation mm (inches)	468.8 (18.46)	374.8 (14.76)	339.6 (13.37)	297.7 (11.72)	235.0 (9.25)	186.4 (7.34)	154.5 (6.08)	139.0 (5.47)	178.4 (7.02)	247.5 (9.74)	288.8 (11.37)	464.2 (18.28)	3,374.7 (132.86)
Average precipitation days (≥ 1 mm)	23.5	21.6	21.3	18.7	16.7	15.7	15.7	13.7	16.6	17.7	18.9	23.8	223.9
Source: Météo-France
