= Faʻaone =

- Associated commune of Taiarapu-Est
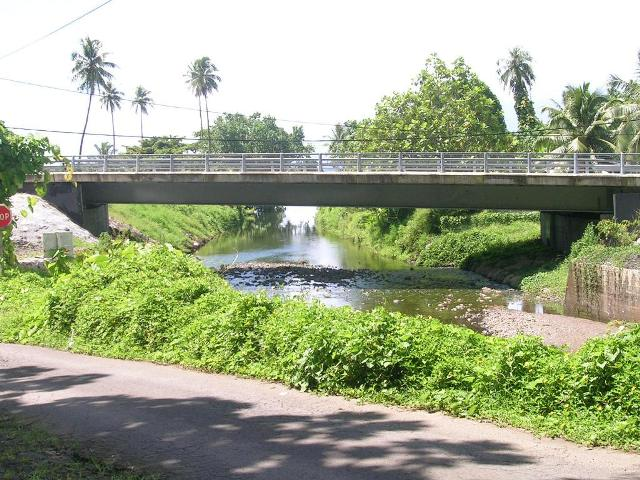
- The Outuofai bridge in Fa'aone

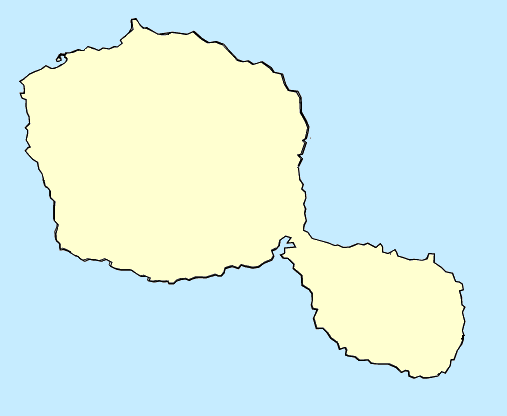
- Location within Tahiti
- Location of Faʻaone
- Coordinates: 17°40′35″S 149°18′27″W
- Country: France
- Overseas collectivity: French Polynesia
- Commune: Taiarapu-Est
- Population (2022): 2,170
- Time zone: UTC−10:00

Faʻaone is an associated commune located in the commune of Taiʻarapu-Est on the island of Tahiti, in French Polynesia.
