= Mahaʻena =

- Associated commune of Hitiaa O Te Ra
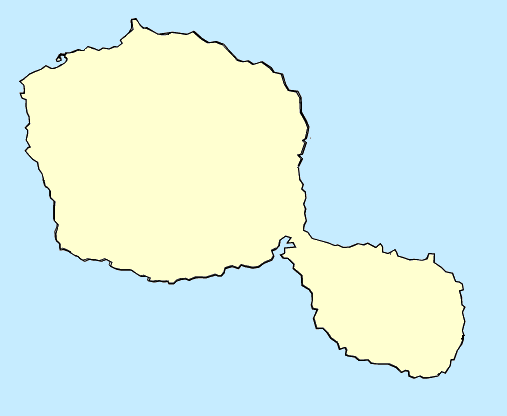
- Location within Tahiti
- Location of Mahaʻena
- Coordinates: 17°34′00″S 149°19′00″W
- Country: France
- Overseas collectivity: French Polynesia
- Commune: Hitiaa O Te Ra
- Population (2022): 1,219
- Time zone: UTC−10:00

Mahaʻena is an associated commune located in the commune of Hitiaʻa O Te Ra on the island of Tahiti, in French Polynesia.
