= Étang de Soulcem =

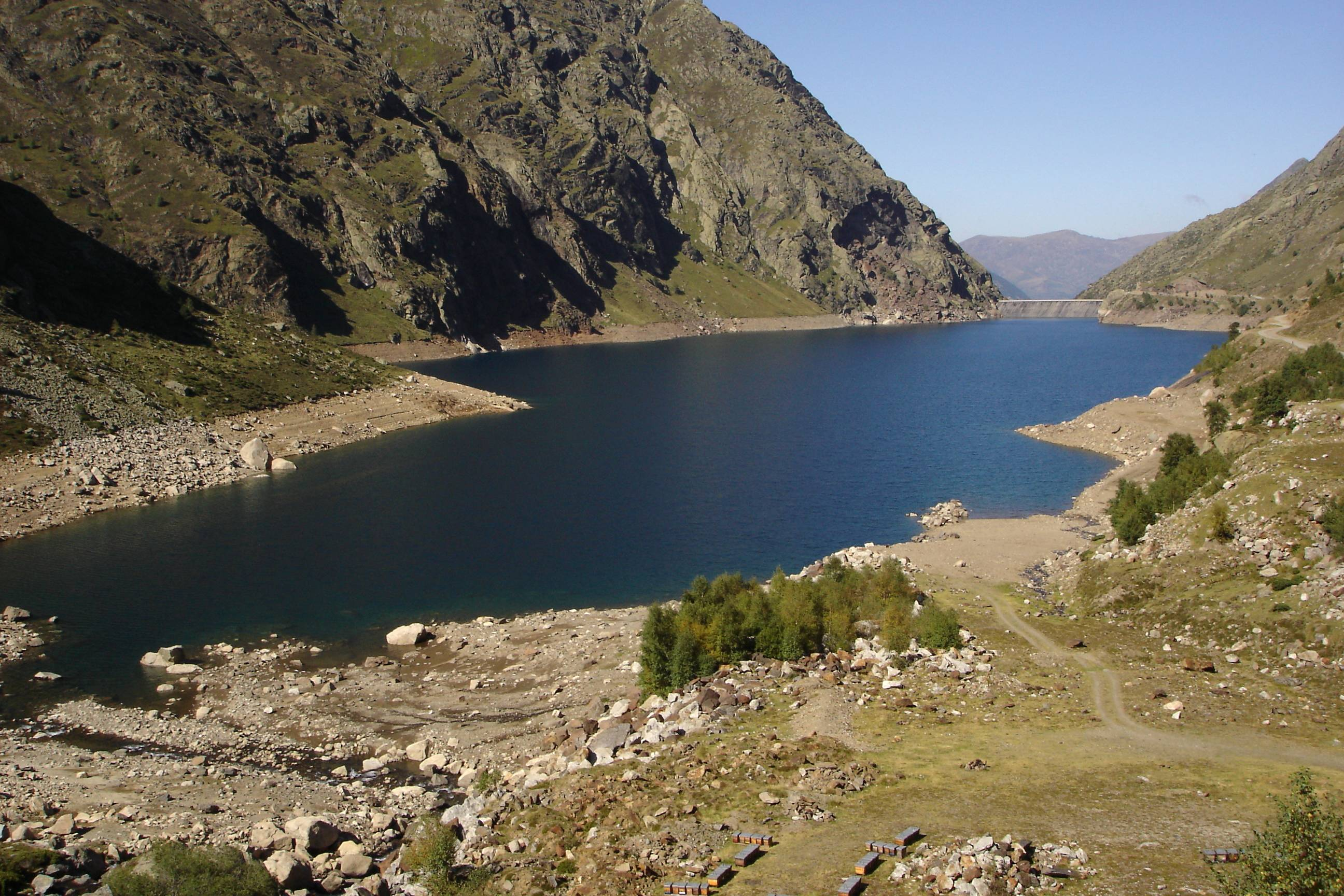
- Interactive map of Étang de Soulcem
- Location: Vicdessos valley, Ariège, France
- Coordinates: 42°40′05″N 01°26′48″E
- Construction began: 1980
- Opening date: 1983
- Operator: Électricité de France

Dam and spillways
- Impounds: Rousseau de Mounicou
- Height: 66.50 m (218.2 ft)
- Length: 275 m (902 ft)
- Width (base): 15 m (49 ft)

Reservoir
- Creates: Étang de Soulcem
- Total capacity: 29,300,000 m^{3} (1.03×10^{9} cu ft)
- Catchment area: 44.3 km^{2} (17.1 sq mi)
- Surface area: 0.91 km^{2} (0.35 sq mi)

Power Station
- Hydraulic head: 409 m (1,342 ft) (via chutes to the Soulcem hydro plant)
- Annual generation: 62 GWh/year
- Average flow 7 m^{3}/s Peak flow 85 m^{3}/s Evacuation flow134 m^{3}/s

Étang de Soulcem is a large artificial lake in the Pyrenees mountains in Ariège, France. It is at an elevation of 1570 m and is used for hydroelectricity, generating 62 GWh/year. The lake, which has a surface area of 0.91 km^{2}, was formed following the construction by Électricité de France of a dam across the northern end of the Vicdessos valley in 1980–1983.

The lake contains various fish including brown trout (S. trutta), Arctic char (S. alpinus), brook trout (S. fontinalis), and common minnow (P. phoxinus).
