= A.S. Matavai =

Tahitian football club

AS Matavai is a Tahitian football club that played in the Championnat d'Honneur, the top level of football in Tahiti, in 2001–02.
