= Mont Orohena =

Mountain on the island of Tahiti

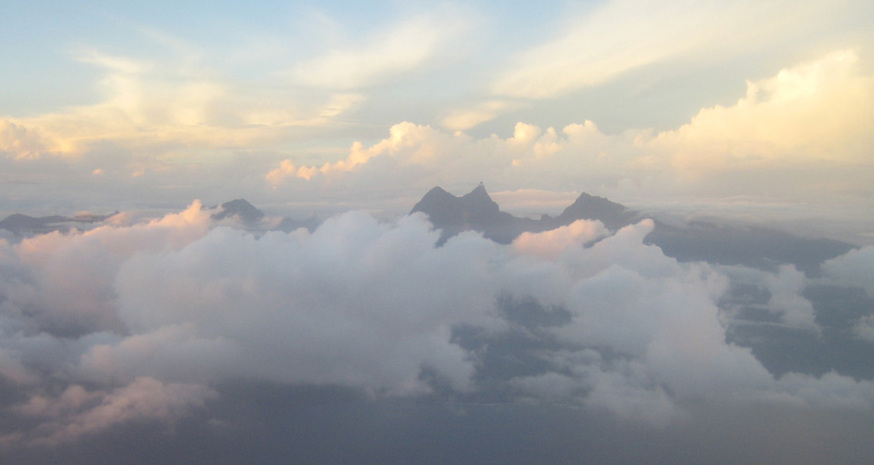

Highest point
- Elevation: 2,241 m (7,352 ft)
- Prominence: 2,241 m (7,352 ft)
- Listing: Ultra; Ribu; World's most isolated peaks 7th
- Coordinates: 17°37′23″S 149°28′37″W

Geography
- Location within Oceania
- Location: Tahiti, French Polynesia

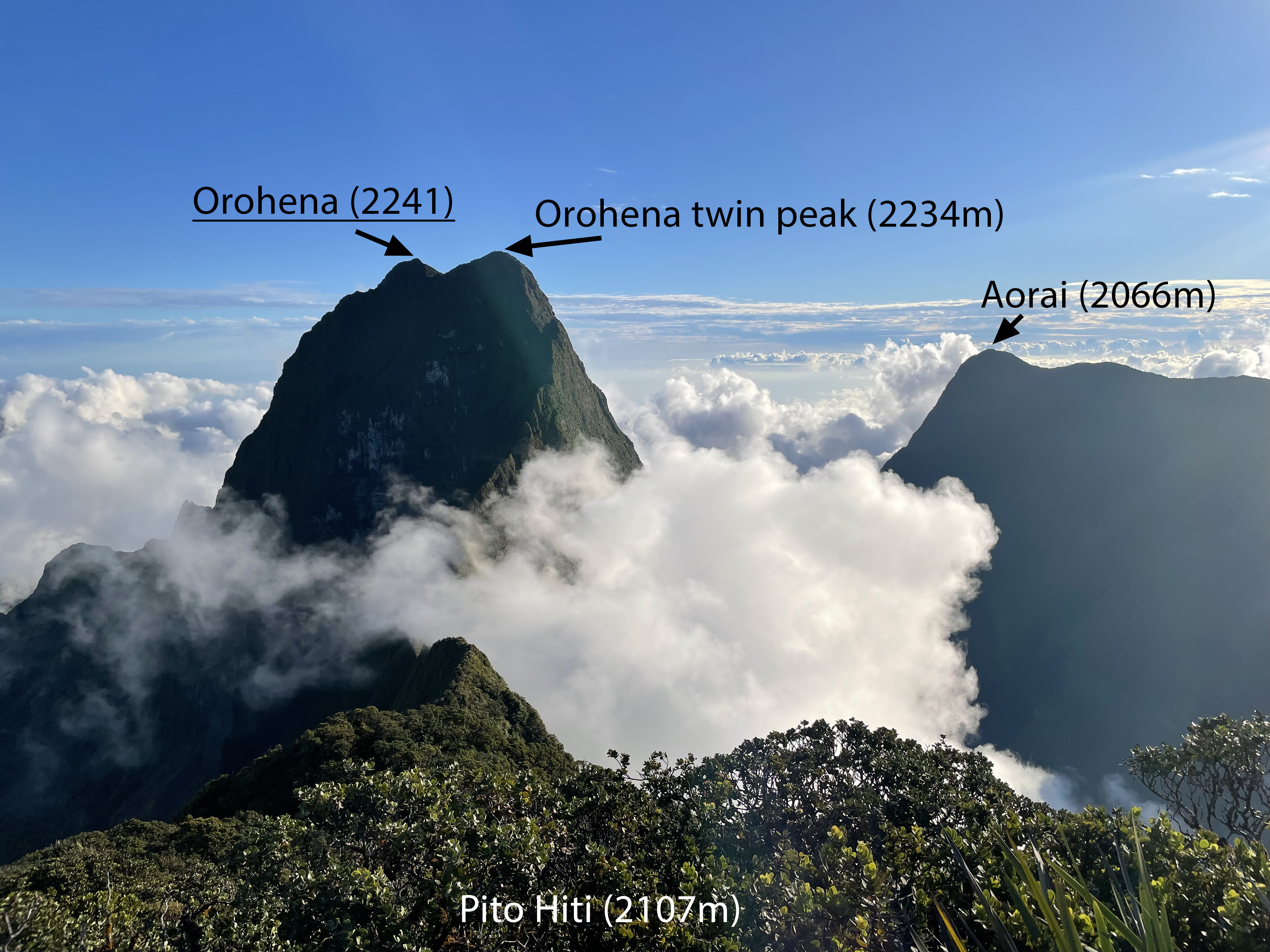
Mont Orohena, Orohena's slightly lower twin peak and Mont Aorai viewed from Mont Pito Hiti

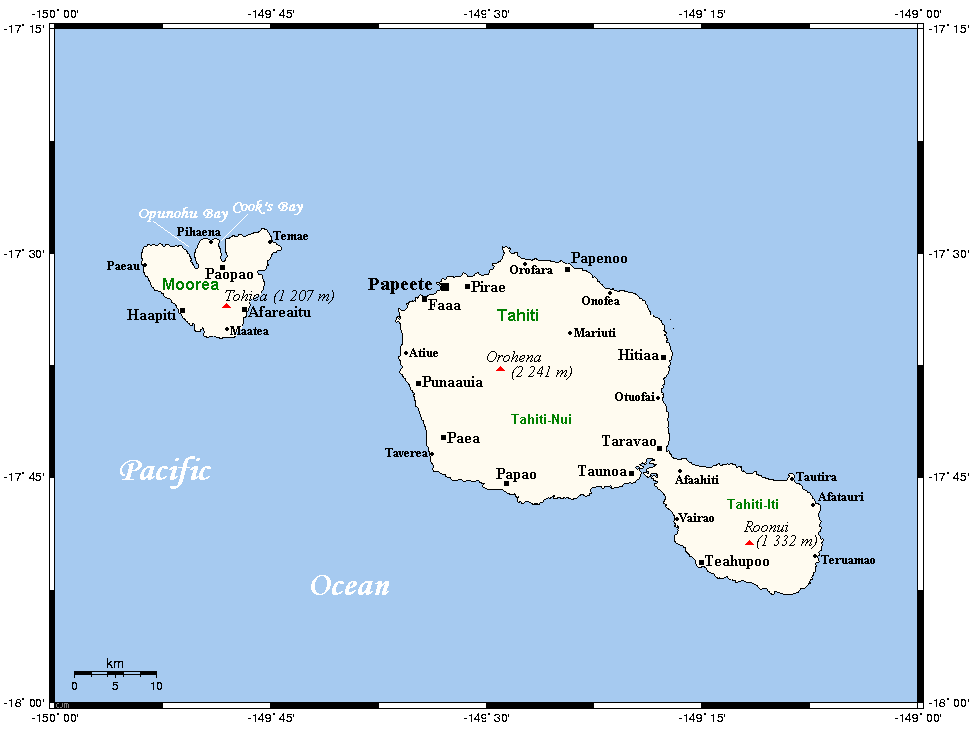
Mont Orohena is located in central Tahiti

Mont Orohena is a mountain located in the South Pacific, on the island of Tahiti. With an elevation of 2,241 metres (7,352 ft) above sea level, it is the highest point of French Polynesia and Tahiti. Mont Orohena is an extinct shield volcano and ranks 7th in the world for topographic isolation.

== See also ==
- List of ultras of Oceania
