= Hitiaʻa O Te Ra =

Commune in French Polynesia, France

- Commune
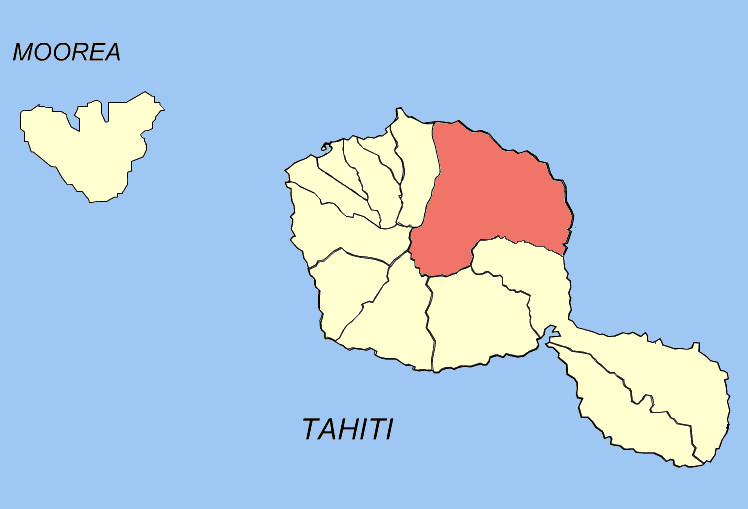
- Location of the commune (in red) within the Windward Islands
- Location of Hitiaʻa O Te Ra
- Coordinates: 17°37′S 149°19′W
- Country: France
- Overseas collectivity: French Polynesia
- Subdivision: Windward Islands

Government
  - Mayor (2020–2026): Henri Flohr
- Area^{1}: 218.2 km^{2} (84.2 sq mi)
- Highest elevation: 2,241 m (7,352 ft)
- Lowest elevation: 0 m (0 ft)
- Population (2022): 10,196
  - Density: 46.73/km^{2} (121.0/sq mi)
- Time zone: UTC−10:00
- INSEE/Postal code: 98722 /98705
- ^{1} French Land Register data, which excludes lakes, ponds, glaciers > 1 km^{2} (0.386 sq mi or 247 acres) and river estuaries.

Hitiaʻa O Te Ra is a commune of French Polynesia, an overseas territory of France in the Pacific Ocean. The commune of Hitiaʻa O Te Ra is located on the island of Tahiti, in the administrative subdivision of the Windward Islands, themselves part of the Society Islands. At the 2022 census it had a population of 10,196.

Hitiaʻa O Te Ra consists of the following associated communes:

- Hitiaa
- Mahaena
- Papenoo
- Tiarei

The administrative center of the commune is the settlement of Tiarei.
