= Hitiaʻa (commune) =

- Associated commune of Hitiaa O Te Ra
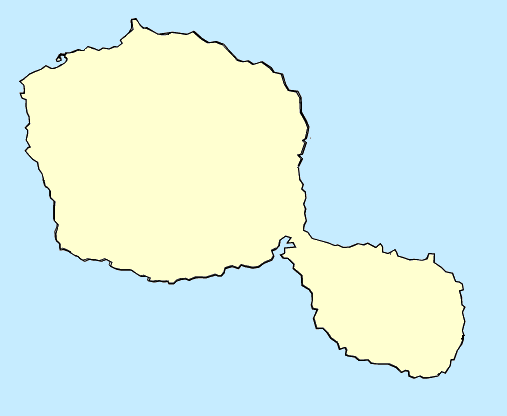
- Location within Tahiti
- Location of Hitiaʻa
- Coordinates: 17°36′30″S 149°18′34″W
- Country: France
- Overseas collectivity: French Polynesia
- Commune: Hitiaa O Te Ra
- Population (2022): 2,102
- Time zone: UTC−10:00

Hitiaʻa is an associated commune located in the commune of Hitiaʻa O Te Ra on the island of Tahiti, in French Polynesia.
