= Papenoʻo =

- Associated commune of Hitiaa O Te Ra
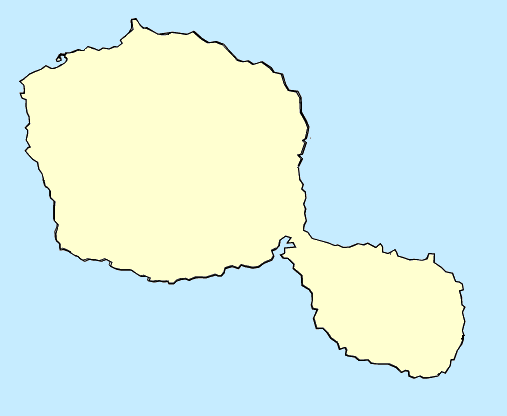
- Location within Tahiti
- Location of Papenoʻo
- Coordinates: 17°30′46″S 149°25′24″W
- Country: France
- Overseas collectivity: French Polynesia
- Commune: Hitiaa O Te Ra
- Area^{1}: 106.29 km^{2} (41.04 sq mi)
- Population (2022): 3,900
  - Density: 37/km^{2} (95/sq mi)
- Time zone: UTC−10:00
- ^{1} French Land Register data, which excludes lakes, ponds, glaciers > 1 km^{2} (0.386 sq mi or 247 acres) and river estuaries.

Papenoʻo is an associated commune located in the commune of Hitiaʻa O Te Ra on the island of Tahiti, in French Polynesia.
