= Tahiti =

Island in French Polynesia

- Flag

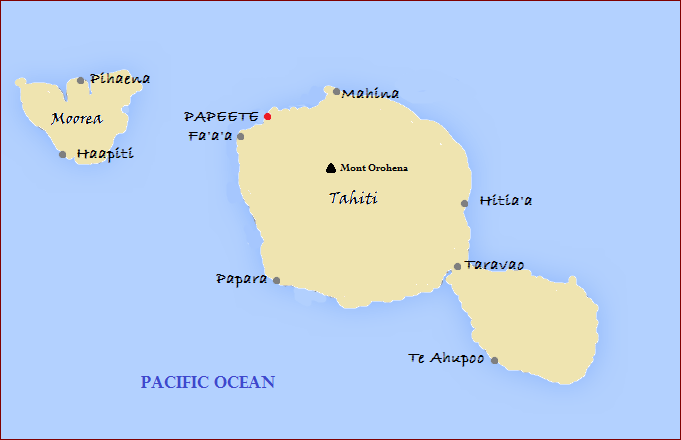
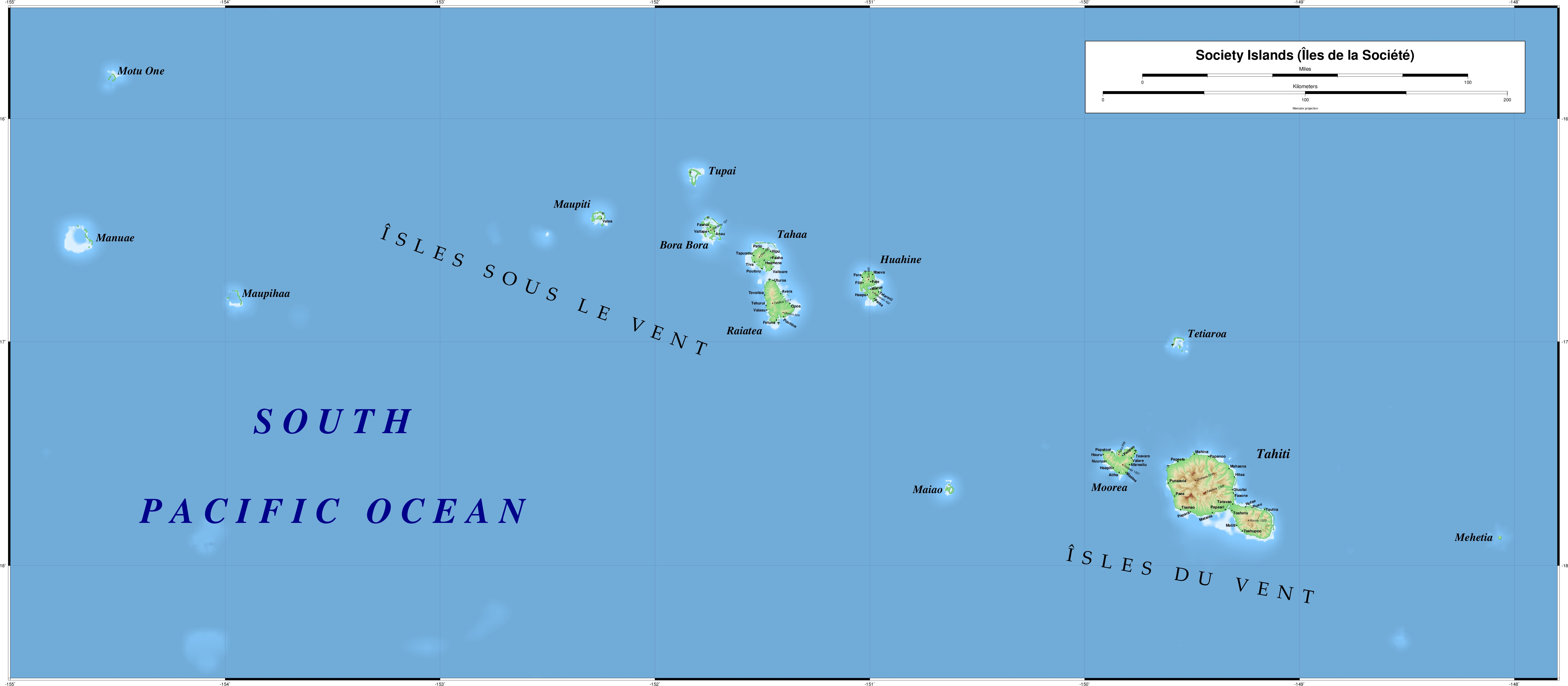
- Tahiti is the largest of the Society Islands

Geography
- Location: Pacific Ocean
- Coordinates: 17°40′S 149°25′W
- Archipelago: Society Islands
- Major islands: Tahiti
- Area: 1,044 km^{2} (403 sq mi)
- Highest elevation: 2,241 m (7352 ft)
- Highest point: Mont Orohena

Administration
- France
- Overseas collectivity: French Polynesia
- Capital city: Papeʻete
- Largest settlement: Papeʻete (pop. 136,777)

Demographics
- Population: 191,779 (2022 census)
- Pop. density: 181/km^{2} (469/sq mi)
- Languages: Tahitian, French
- Ethnic groups: Tahitians, Europeans, Chinese immigrants

Tahiti (English: /təˈhiːti/; Tahitian: [taˈhiti, ˈthaiti]; French: [ta.iti]) is the largest island of the Windward group of the Society Islands in French Polynesia, an overseas collectivity of France. It is a tropical island located in the central part of the Pacific Ocean. Tahiti is composed of two roughly circular land masses joined by an isthmus: Tahiti Nui and Tahiti Iti. Both are the eroded remnants of now-extinct shield volcanoes. The terrain of Tahiti is mostly high and mountainous, with the beaches and coral reefs that surround the island supporting tourism and fishing industries.

Tahiti's population was 189,517 in 2017, making it by far the most populous island in French Polynesia and accounting for 68.7% of the collectivity's total population; the 2022 Census recorded a population of 191,779. Tahiti is the economic, cultural, and political centre of French Polynesia. The capital of French Polynesia, Papeʻete, is located on the northwest coast of Tahiti. The only international airport in the region, Faʻaʻā International Airport, is on Tahiti near Papeʻete.

Tahiti was originally settled by Polynesians between 900 and 1100 CE. Those of Polynesian heritage still represent about 70% of the island's population, with the rest made up of people of European, Chinese, and mixed heritage. The island was part of the Kingdom of Tahiti until its annexation by France in 1880, when it was proclaimed a colony of France, and the inhabitants became French citizens. French is the sole official language, although the Tahitian language (Reo Tahiti) is also widely spoken.

== Nomenclature ==
Tahiti was called Otaheite in earlier European documents, which is a rendering of the Tahitian phrase ʻo Tahiti, and is typically pronounced [ʔotaˈhɛiti]. When early Europeans asked the name of the island, the reply was "'o Tahiti", meaning "it is Tahiti".

== Geography, climate and vegetation ==
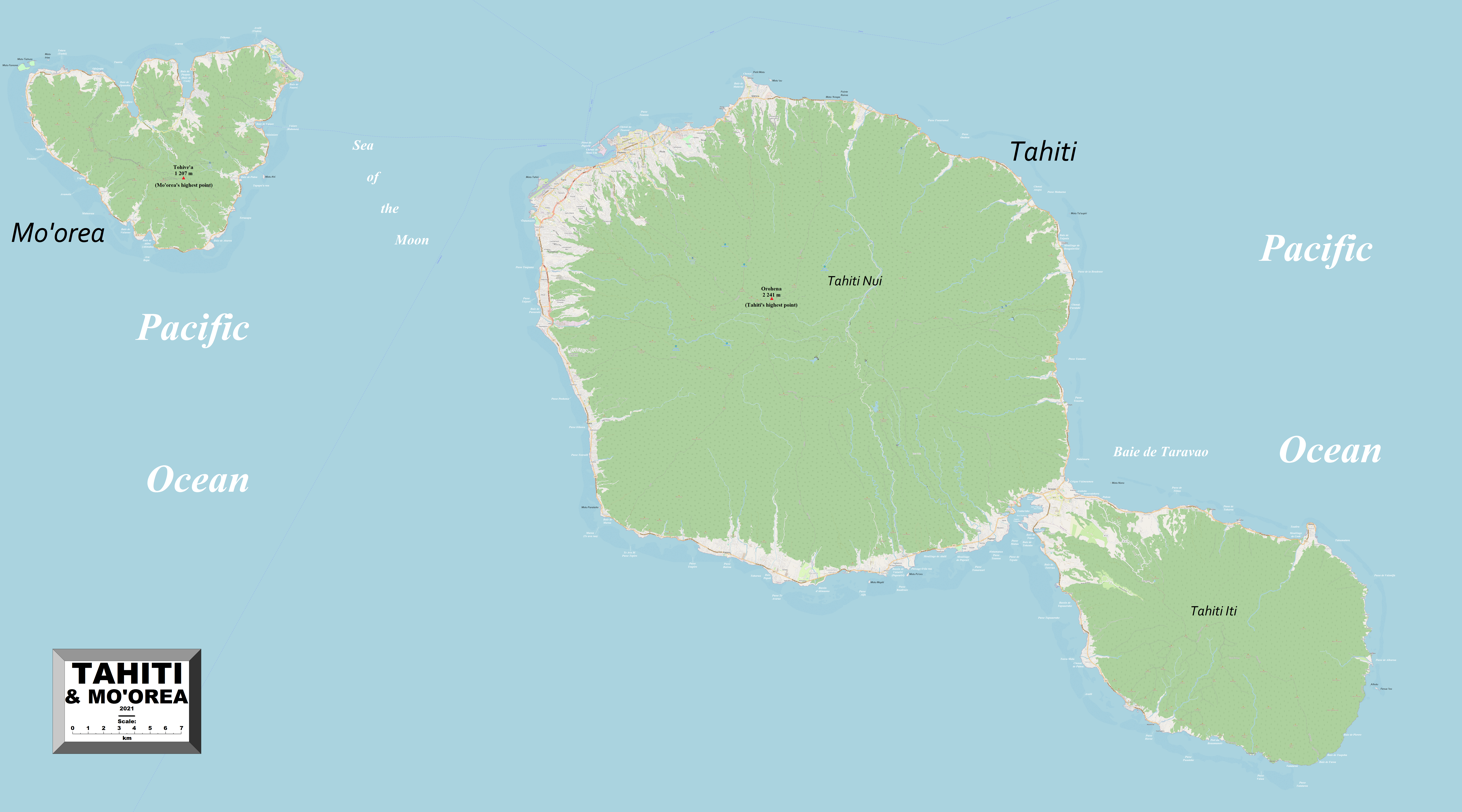
Tahiti-Moʻorea map

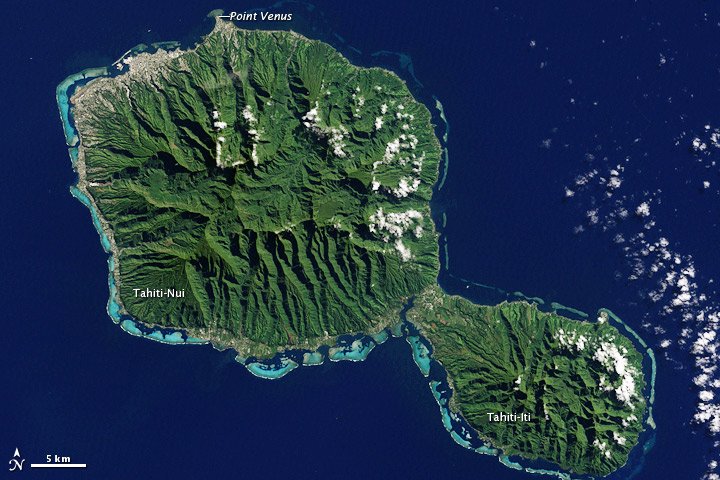
Tahiti from space

Tahiti is the highest and largest island in French Polynesia, and is close to Moʻorea island. It is located 4,400 kilometres (2,376 nautical miles) south of Hawaiʻi, 7,900 km (4,266 nmi) from Chile, 5,700 km (3,078 nmi) from Australia. The nearest major landmass is the North Island of New Zealand, approximately 3,800 kilometres (2,052 nautical miles) to the south-west.

The island is 45 km (28 mi) across at its widest point and covers an area of 1,045 km^{2} (403 sq mi). The highest peak is Mont Orohena (Mouʻa ʻOrohena) (2,241 m (7,352 ft)). Mount Roonui, or Mount Ronui (Mouʻa Rōnui), in the southeast rises to 1,332 m (4,370 ft). The island consists of two roughly round portions centered on volcanic mountains and connected by a short isthmus of Taravao.

The northwestern portion is known as Tahiti Nui ("big Tahiti"), while the much smaller southeastern portion is known as Tahiti Iti ("small Tahiti") or Taiʻarapū. Tahiti Nui is heavily populated along the coast, especially around the capital, Papeʻete.

The interior of Tahiti Nui is almost entirely uninhabited. Tahiti Iti has remained isolated, as its southeastern half (Te Pari) is accessible only to those traveling by boat or on foot. The rest of the island is encircled by a main road which cuts between the mountains and the sea. Tahiti's landscape features lush rainforests and many rivers and waterfalls, including the Papenoʻo on the north side and the Fautaua Falls near Papeʻete.

=== Geology ===
Tahiti consists of two overlapping, heavily eroded and now extinct shield volcanoes: Tahiti Nui (the bigger, northwestern part) and Tahiti Iti (the smaller, southeastern part). These volcanoes were active between 0.25 and 1.67 million years ago are associated with the same hotspot which is the source of the other Society Islands.

=== Climate ===
November to April is the wet season; the wettest month is January, with 340 millimetres (13 in) of rain in Papeʻete. August is the driest with 48 millimetres (1.9 in).

The average temperature ranges between 21 and 31 °C (70 and 88 °F), with little seasonal variation. The lowest and highest temperatures recorded in Papeʻete are 16 and 34 °C (61 and 93 °F), respectively.

Climate data for Tahiti, 1961–1990 normals
Month	Jan	Feb	Mar	Apr	May	Jun	Jul	Aug	Sep	Oct	Nov	Dec	Year
Mean daily maximum °C (°F)	30.3 (86.5)	30.5 (86.9)	30.8 (87.4)	30.6 (87.1)	29.9 (85.8)	28.9 (84.0)	28.3 (82.9)	28.2 (82.8)	28.6 (83.5)	29.1 (84.4)	29.5 (85.1)	29.8 (85.6)	29.5 (85.2)
Daily mean °C (°F)	26.8 (80.2)	27.0 (80.6)	27.2 (81.0)	26.9 (80.4)	26.2 (79.2)	25.1 (77.2)	24.4 (75.9)	24.3 (75.7)	24.8 (76.6)	25.5 (77.9)	26.1 (79.0)	26.4 (79.5)	25.9 (78.6)
Mean daily minimum °C (°F)	23.4 (74.1)	23.5 (74.3)	23.5 (74.3)	23.3 (73.9)	22.5 (72.5)	21.2 (70.2)	20.8 (69.4)	20.5 (68.9)	21.0 (69.8)	21.9 (71.4)	22.6 (72.7)	23.1 (73.6)	22.3 (72.1)
Average precipitation mm (inches)	315.2 (12.41)	233.0 (9.17)	195.3 (7.69)	140.8 (5.54)	92.0 (3.62)	60.2 (2.37)	60.5 (2.38)	48.0 (1.89)	46.3 (1.82)	90.8 (3.57)	162.1 (6.38)	317.0 (12.48)	1,761.2 (69.32)
Source: World Meteorological Organization

== History ==
=== Early settling of Tahiti ===
The first Tahitians arrived from Western Polynesia into the Society Islands sometime after 900 CE; some studies have proposed slightly later dates, ∼1025–1120 CE. Linguistic, biological and archaeological evidence supports a long migration from Southeast Asia via the Fijian, Samoan and Tongan Archipelagos using outrigger canoes that were up to twenty or thirty metres long and could transport families as well as domestic animals.

=== Civilization before the arrival of the Europeans ===
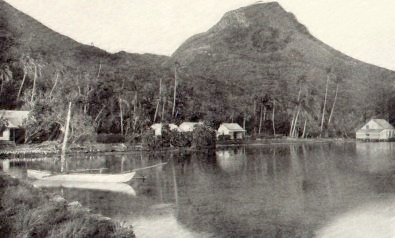
View of Raʻiātea Mountain. The mummies of Tahitian rulers were formerly deposited on this mountain, which is considered sacred (tapu).

Before the arrival of the Europeans, the island was divided into territories, each dominated by a single clan. The most important clans were the closely related Teva i Uta (Teva of the Interior) and the Teva i Tai (Teva of the Sea) whose combined territory extended from the peninsula in the south of Tahiti Nui.

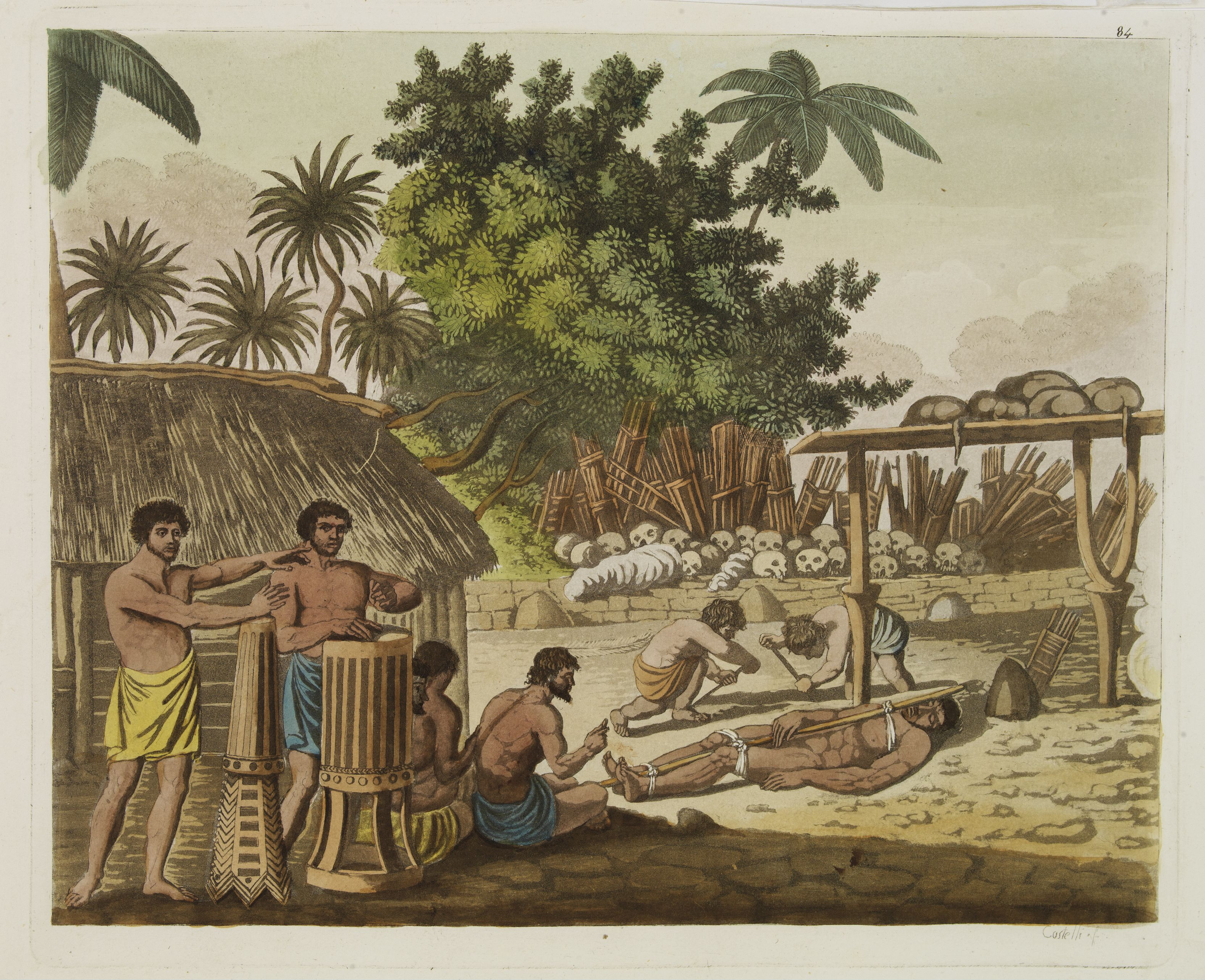
An 1827 representation of human sacrifice in Tahiti, based on the account of Captain Cook c. 1773.

Clan leadership consisted of a chief (ariʻi rahi), nobles (ariʻi), and under-chiefs (ʻĪatoʻai). The ariʻi were also the religious leaders, revered for the mana (spiritual power) they inherited as descendants of the gods. As symbols of their power, they wore belts of red feathers. Nonetheless, to exercise their political power, councils or general assemblies composed of the ariʻi and the ʻĪatoʻai had to be called, especially in case of war.

The chief's spiritual power was also limited; each clan's practice was organized around their marae (stone temple) and its priests.

=== First European visits ===
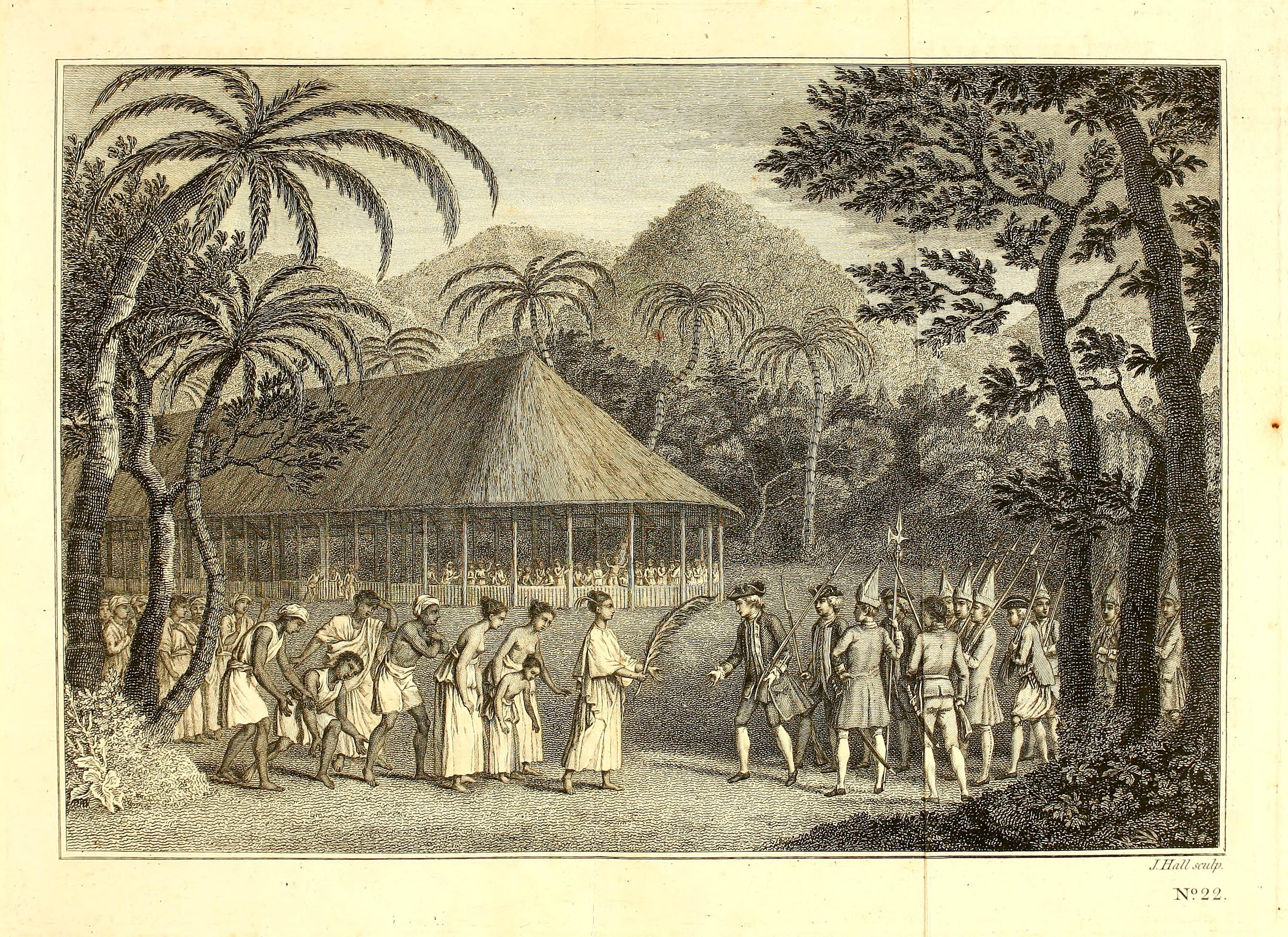
The meeting between Wallis and Oberea

The first European to arrive at Tahiti may have been the Spanish explorer Juan Fernández during his 1576–1577 expedition. Alternatively, Portuguese navigator Pedro Fernandes de Queirós, serving the Spanish Crown in an expedition to Terra Australis, was perhaps the first European to see Tahiti. He sighted an inhabited island on 10 February 1606. However, it has been suggested that he actually saw the island of Rekareka to the southeast of Tahiti. Hence, although the Spanish and Portuguese made contact with nearby islands, they may not have arrived at Tahiti.

The next stage of European visits to the region came during the period of intense Anglo-French rivalry that filled the twelve years between the Seven Years' War and the American Revolutionary War. The first of these visits, and perhaps the first European visit to Tahiti, was under the command of Captain Samuel Wallis. While circumnavigating the globe in HMS Dolphin, they sighted the island on 18 June 1767. Then they harbored in Matavai Bay between the chiefdom Pare-Arue (governed by Tu (Tu-nui-e-aʻa-i-te-Atua) and his regent Tutaha) and the chiefdom Haʻapape, governed by Amo and his wife "Oberea" (Purea). The initially friendly encounter turned tense as islanders grew suspicious and sought control of the Dolphin, leading to a week of skirmishes that culminated in violence, but to avert all-out war after a British show of force, Oberea laid down peace offerings leading to cordial relations.

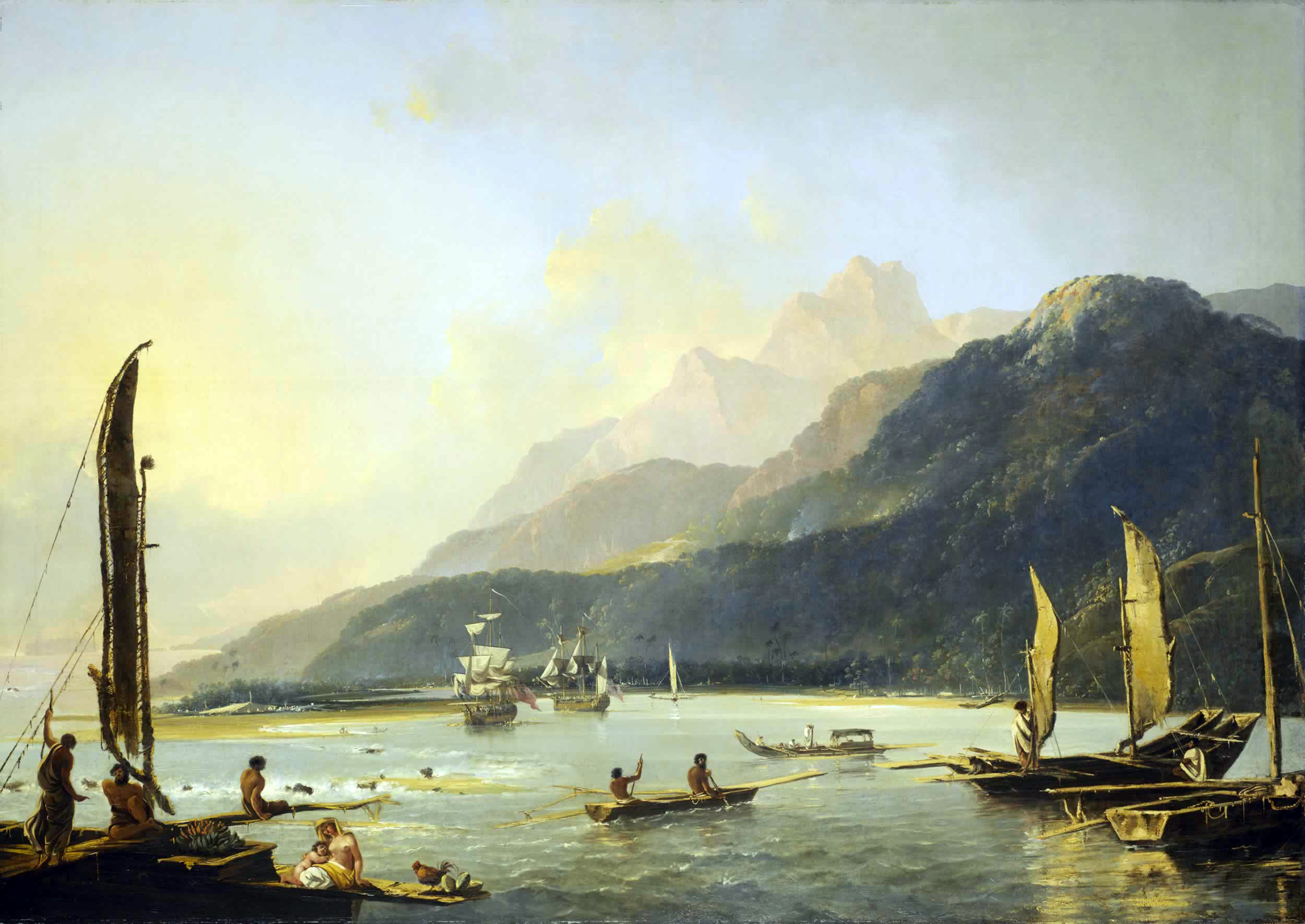
Matavai Bay, Tahiti, painted by William Hodges, member of an expedition led by Captain Cook

On 2 April 1768, the expedition of Louis-Antoine de Bougainville, aboard Boudeuse and Etoile on the first French circumnavigation, sighted Tahiti. On 5 April, they anchored off Hitiaʻa O Te Ra and were welcomed by its chief Reti. Tutaha also visited Bougainville. Bougainville stayed about ten days.

By 12 April 1769, Captain James Cook had arrived in Tahiti's Matavai Bay on a scientific mission with astronomy, botany, and artistic details. On 14 April Cook met Tutaha and Tepau and the next day he picked the site for a fortified camp at Point Venus for Charles Green's observatory. Botanist Joseph Banks and artist Sydney Parkinson, along with Cook, gathered valuable information on fauna and flora as well as on native society, language and customs, including the proper name of the island. Cook also met many island chiefs. Cook and Endeavour left Tahiti on 13 July 1769. Cook estimated the population to be 200,000, including all the nearby islands in the chain. This estimate was reduced to 35,000 by Cook's contemporary, anthropologist and Tahiti expert Douglas L. Oliver.

The Viceroy of Peru, Manuel de Amat y Juniet, under order of the Spanish Crown, organized an expedition to colonize the island in 1772. He would ultimately send three expeditions aboard the ship Aguila, the first two under the command of navigator Domingo de Bonechea. Four Tahitians, Pautu, Tipitipia, Heiao, and Tetuanui, accompanied Bonechea back to Peru in early 1773 after the first Aguila expedition.

Cook returned to Tahiti between 15 August and 1 September 1773. Greeted by the chiefs, Cook anchored in Vaitepiha Bay before returning to Point Venus. Cook left Tahiti on 14 May 1774.

Pautu and Tetuanui returned to Tahiti with Bonechea aboard Aguila on 14 November 1774; Tipitipia and Heiao had died. Bonechea died on 26 January 1775 in Tahiti and was buried near the mission he had established at Tautira Bay. Lt Tomas Gayangos took over command and set sail for Peru on 27 January, leaving the Fathers Geronimo Clota and Narciso Gonzalez and the sailors Maximo Rodriguez and Francisco Perez in charge of the mission. On the third Aguila expedition, under Don Cayetano de Langara, the mission on Tahiti was abandoned on 12 November 1775, when the Fathers successfully begged to be taken back to Lima.

During his final visit in 1777, Cook first moored in Vaitepiha Bay. From there, he reunited with many Tahitian clans and established a British presence on the remains of the Spanish mission. On 29 September 1777 Cook sailed for Papetoʻai Bay on Moʻorea.

=== British influence and the rise of the Pōmare ===
==== Mutineers of the Bounty ====
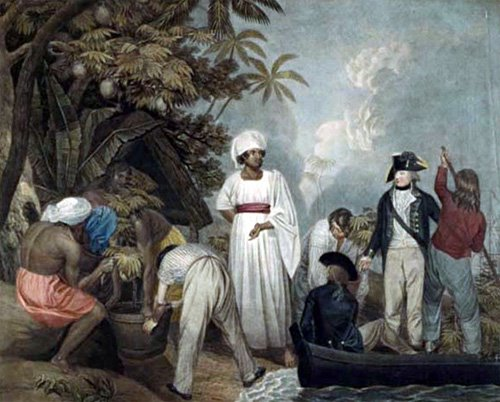
William Bligh overseeing the transplantation of breadfruit trees from Tahiti

On 26 October 1788, HMS Bounty, under the command of Captain William Bligh, landed in Tahiti with the mission of carrying Tahitian breadfruit trees (Tahitian: ʻuru) to the Caribbean. Sir Joseph Banks, the botanist from James Cook's first expedition, had concluded that this plant would be ideal to feed the enslaved Africans working in the Caribbean plantations at very little cost. The crew remained in Tahiti for about 5 months, the time needed to transplant the trees' seedlings. Three weeks after leaving Tahiti, on 28 April 1789, the crew mutinied on the initiative of Fletcher Christian. The mutineers seized the ship and set the captain and most of those members of the crew who remained loyal to him adrift in a ship's boat. A group of mutineers then went back to settle in Tahiti, after which the Bounty, under Christian, sailed to Pitcairn Island.

Although various explorers had refused to get involved in tribal conflicts, the mutineers from the Bounty offered their services as mercenaries and furnished arms to the family, which became the Pōmare Dynasty. The chief Tū knew how to use their presence in the harbours favoured by sailors to his advantage. As a result of his alliance with the mutineers, he succeeded in considerably increasing his supremacy over the island of Tahiti.

In about 1790, the ambitious chief Tū took the title of king and gave himself the name Pōmare. Captain Bligh explains that this name was a homage to his eldest daughter Teriʻinavahoroa, who had died of tuberculosis, "an illness that made her cough (mare) a lot, especially at night (pō)". Thus, he became Pōmare I, founding the Pōmare Dynasty, and his lineage would be the first to unify Tahiti from 1788 to 1791. He and his descendants founded and expanded Tahitian influence to all of the lands that now constitute modern French Polynesia.

In 1791, HMS Pandora under Captain Edward Edwards called at Tahiti and took custody of fourteen of the mutineers. Four were drowned in the sinking of Pandora on her homeward voyage, three were hanged, four were acquitted, and three were pardoned.

==== Landings of the whalers ====
In the 1790s, whalers began landing at Tahiti during their hunting expeditions in the southern hemisphere. The arrival of these whalers, later joined by merchants from the penal colonies in Australia, marked the first major upheaval of traditional Tahitian society. The crews introduced alcohol, arms, and infectious diseases to the island. These commercial interactions with Westerners had catastrophic consequences for the Tahitian population, which shrank rapidly, ravaged by diseases and other cultural factors. During the first decade of the 19th century, the Tahitian population dropped from 16,000 to 8,000–9,000; the French census in 1854 counted a population just under 6,000.

==== Arrival of the missionaries ====
On 5 March 1797, representatives of the London Missionary Society landed at Matavai Bay (Mahina) on board Duff, with the intention of converting the pagan native populations to Christianity. The arrival of these missionaries marked a turning point for the island of Tahiti, with a lasting impact on local culture.

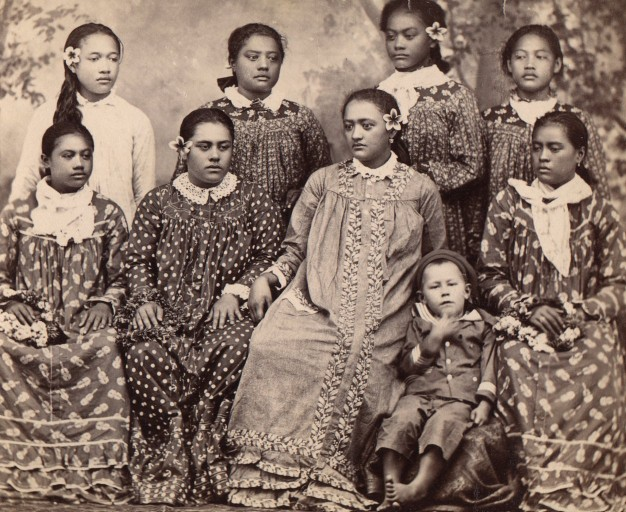
Tahitians in missionary robes

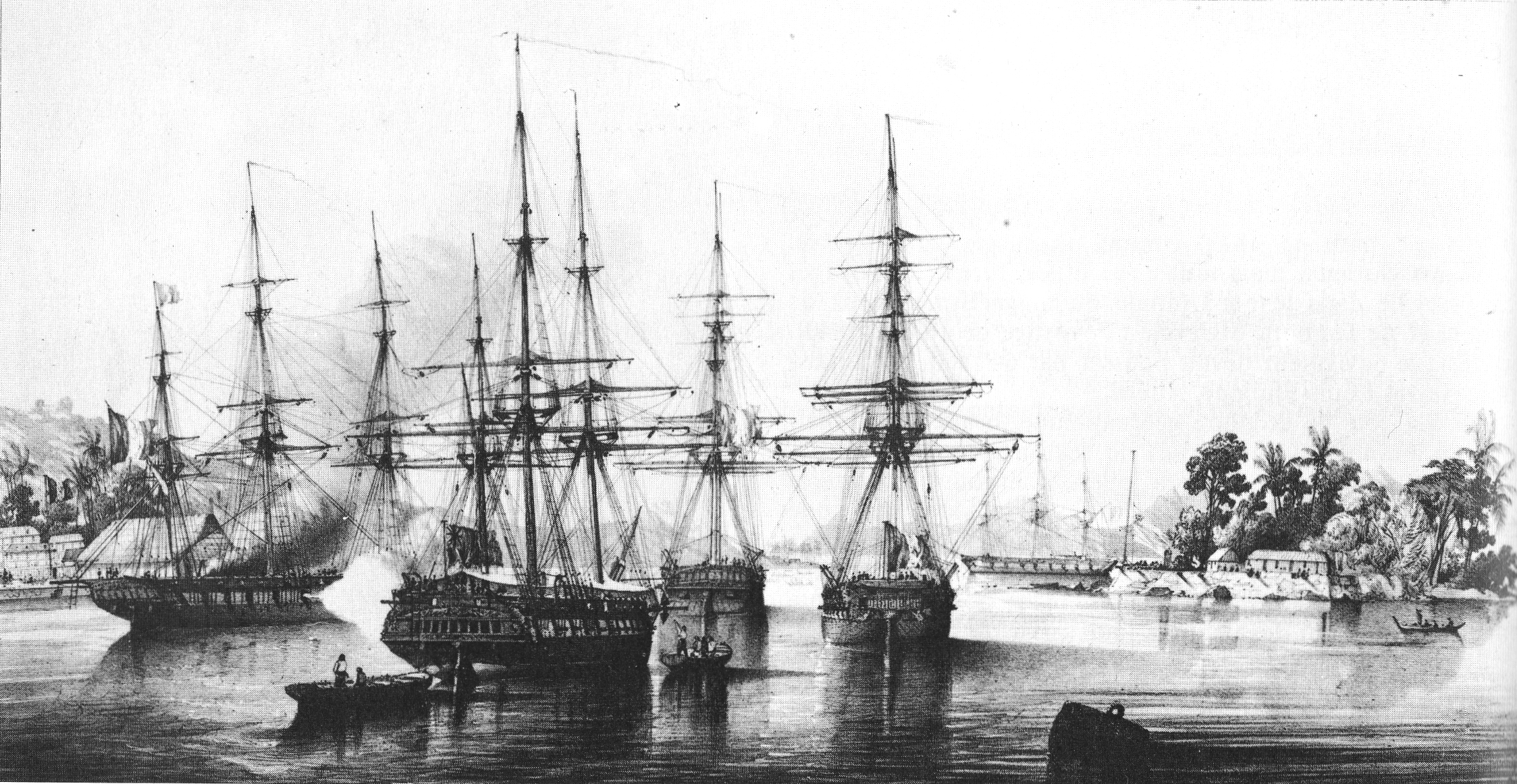
Abel Aubert du Petit-Thouars taking over Tahiti on 9 September 1842

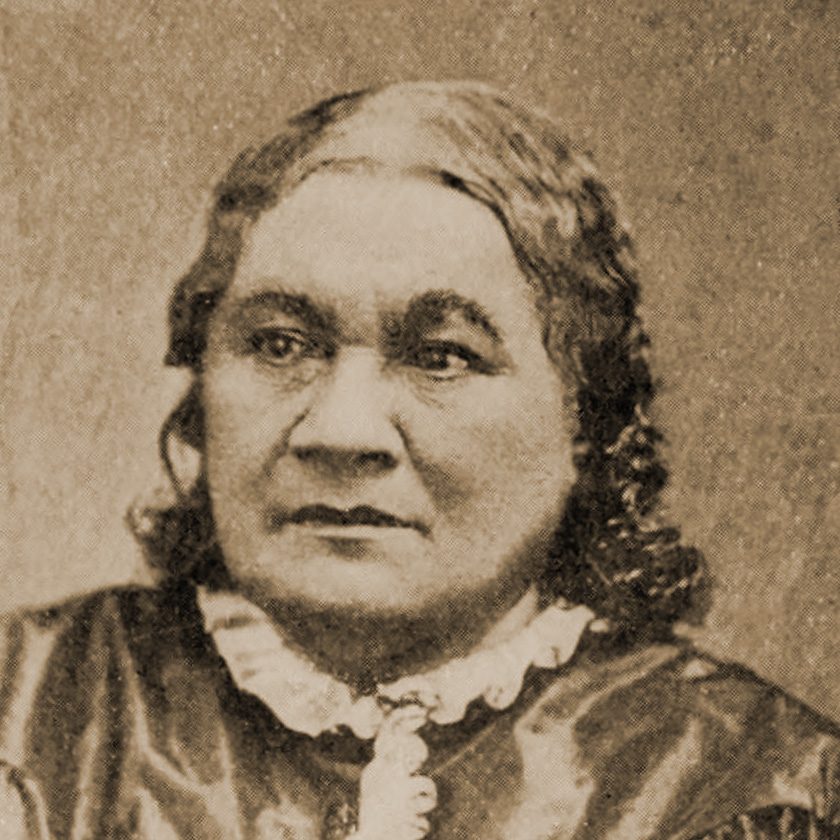
Queen Pōmare IV, 1813–1877

The first years proved hard work for the missionaries, despite their association with Pōmare, whose importance they were aware of thanks to the reports of earlier sailors. In 1803, upon the death of Pōmare I, his son Vairaʻatoa succeeded him and took the title of Pōmare II. He increasingly aligned himself with the missionaries, and from 1803, they taught him to read and the Gospels. Furthermore, the missionaries encouraged his wish to conquer his opponents, so that they would have to deal with only a single political contact, enabling them to spread Christianity across a unified country. The conversion of Pōmare II to Protestantism in 1812 marks, moreover, the point when Protestantism truly took off on the island.

In about 1810, Pōmare II married Teremoʻemoʻe, daughter of the chief of Raiatea, to ally himself with the chiefdoms of the Leeward Islands. On 12 November 1815, thanks to these alliances, Pōmare II won a decisive battle at Feʻi Pī (Punaʻauia), notably against Opuhara, the chief of the powerful clan of Teva. This victory allowed Pōmare II to be styled Ariʻi Rahi, or the king of Tahiti. It was the first time that Tahiti had been united under the control of a single family. This marked the end of Tahitian feudalism and the military aristocracy, which were replaced by an absolute monarchy. At the same time, Protestantism quickly spread under Pōmare II's support and supplanted traditional beliefs. In 1816, the London Missionary Society sent John Williams as a missionary and teacher, and starting in 1817, the Gospels were translated into Tahitian (Reo Maohi) and taught in the religious schools. In 1818, the minister William Pascoe Crook founded the city of Papeʻete, which became the capital of the island.

In 1819, Pōmare II, encouraged by the missionaries, introduced the first Tahitian legal code, known as the Pōmare Legal Code, which consists of nineteen laws. The missionaries and Pōmare II thus imposed a ban on nudity (obliging them to wear clothes covering their whole body), banned dances and chants (described as immodest), tattoos, and costumes made of flowers.

In the 1820s, the entire population of Tahiti converted to Protestantism. Duperrey, who berthed in Tahiti in May 1823, attests to the change in Tahitian society in a letter dated 15 May 1823: "The missionaries of the Royal Society of London have totally changed the morals and customs of the inhabitants. Idolatry no longer exists among them, and they generally profess the Christian religion. The women no longer come aboard the vessel, and even when we meet them on land, they are extremely reserved. (...) The bloody wars that these people used to carry out and human sacrifices have no longer taken place since 1816."

When Pōmare II died on 7 December 1821, his son, Pōmare III, was only eighteen months old. His uncle and the religious people therefore supported the regency, until 2 May 1824, the date on which the missionaries conducted his coronation, a ceremony unprecedented in Tahiti. Taking advantage of the weakness of the Pōmare, local chiefs won back some of their power and took the hereditary title of Tavana (from the English word "governor"). The missionaries also took advantage of the situation to change the way power was structured and to make the Tahitian monarchy more closely resemble the English model of a constitutional monarchy. They therefore created the Tahitian Legislative Assembly, which first sat on 23 February 1824.

In 1827, the young Pōmare III suddenly died, and it was his half-sister, ʻAimata, aged thirteen, who took the title of Pōmare IV. The Birmingham-born missionary George Pritchard, who was the acting British consul, became her main adviser and sought to interest her in the kingdom's affairs. Still, the authority of the queen, who was certainly less charismatic than her father, was challenged by the chiefs, who had won back an important part of their prerogatives since the death of Pōmare II. The power of the Pōmare had become more symbolic than real; time and time again, Queen Pōmare, Protestant and anglophile, sought in vain the protection of England.

In November 1835, Charles Darwin visited Tahiti aboard HMS Beagle on its circumnavigation, captained by Robert FitzRoy. He was impressed by what he perceived as the positive influence the missionaries had on the population's sobriety and moral character. Darwin praised the scenery, but was not flattering towards Tahiti's queen Pōmare IV. Captain Fitzroy negotiated payment of compensation for an attack on an English ship by Tahitians, which had taken place in 1833.

In Sept. 1839, the island was visited by the United States Exploring Expedition. One of its members, Alfred Thomas Agate, produced several sketches of Tahitian life, some of which were later published in the United States.

=== French protectorate and the end of the Pōmare kingdom ===
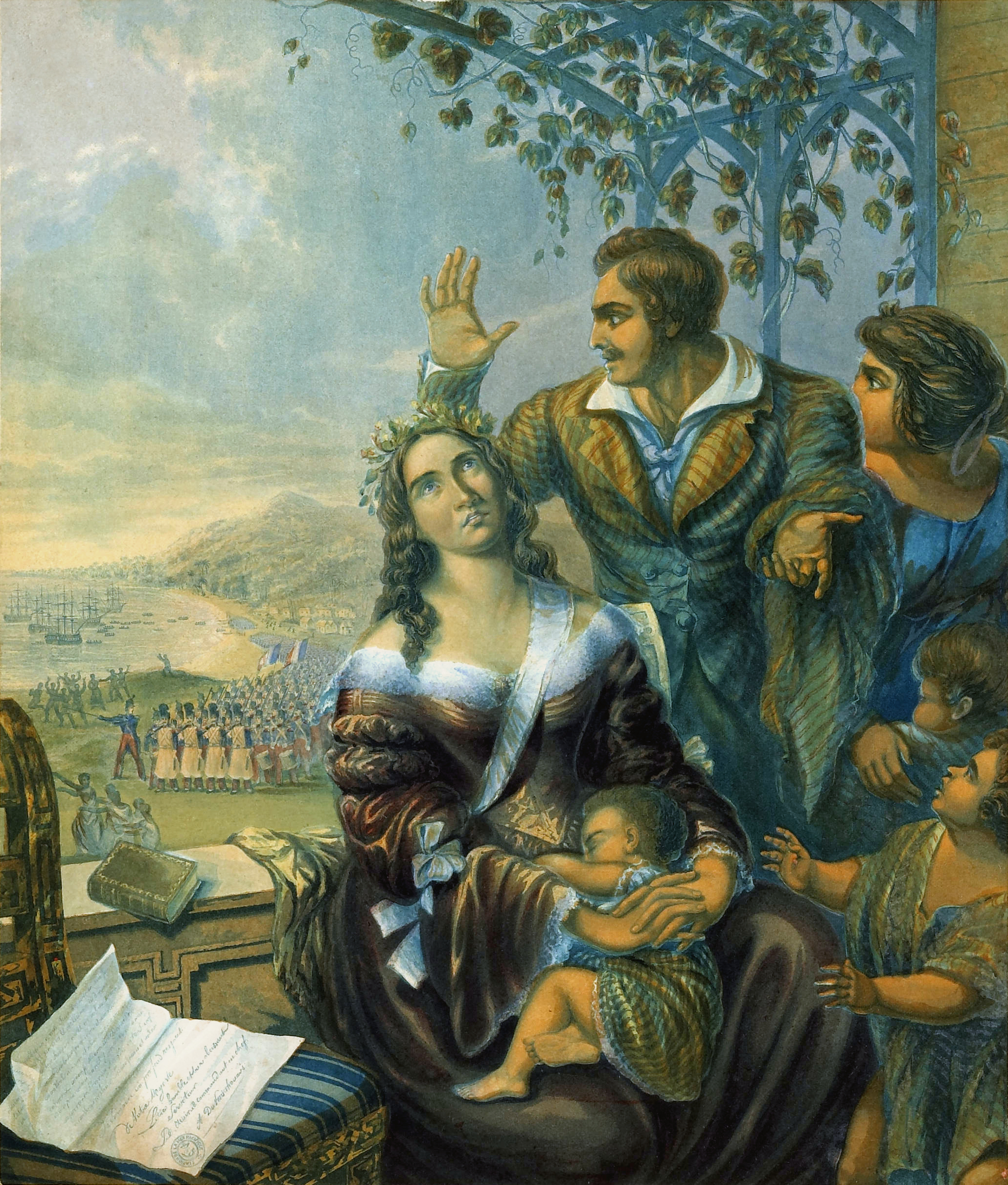
Queen Pomare and her family on the verandah of Mr. Pritchard's house, during the French Invasion of Tahiti

In 1836, the queen's advisor, Pritchard, had two French Catholic priests expelled: François Caret and Honoré Laval. As a result, in 1838, France sent Admiral Abel Aubert du Petit-Thouars to obtain reparations. Once his mission had been completed, Admiral Du Petit-Thouars sailed towards the Marquesas Islands, which he annexed in 1842. Also in 1842, tensions involving Morocco escalated between France and Great Britain, souring their relations. In August 1842, Admiral Du Petit-Thouars returned and landed in Tahiti. He then made friends with Tahitian chiefs who were hostile to the Pōmare family and favourable to a French protectorate. He had them sign a request for protection in the absence of their queen, then approached her and obliged her to ratify the terms of the protectorate treaty. The treaty had not even been ratified by France itself when Jacques-Antoine Moerenhout was named royal commissaire alongside Queen Pōmare.

Within the framework of this treaty, France recognised the sovereignty of the Tahitian state. The queen was responsible for internal affairs, while France would handle foreign relations, defend Tahiti, and maintain order on the island. Once the treaty was signed, a struggle for influence began between English Protestants and French Catholic representatives. During the first years of the Protectorate, the Protestants managed to retain a considerable hold over Tahitian society, thanks to their knowledge of the country and its language. George Pritchard had been away at the time. He returned, however, to work towards indoctrinating the locals against the Roman Catholic French.

=== Tahitian War of Independence (1844–47) ===
In 1843, the queen's Protestant advisor, Pritchard, persuaded her to display the Tahitian flag in place of the flag of the Protectorate. By way of reprisal, Admiral Dupetit-Thouars announced the annexation of the Kingdom of Pōmare on 6 November 1843 and set up the governor Armand Joseph Bruat there as the chief of the new colony. He threw Pritchard into prison and later sent him back to Britain. The annexation led to the queen's exile to the Leeward Islands, and after a period of troubles, a real Franco-Tahitian war began in March 1844. News of Tahiti reached Europe in early 1844. The French statesman François Guizot, supported by King Louis-Philippe of France, had denounced the annexation of the island.

Tamatoa V (Tamatoa-a-tu Pōmare, 1842–1881), the son of Queen Pōmare IV, Tahiti, c. 1875

The war ended in December 1846 in favour of the French. The queen returned from exile in 1847 and agreed to sign a new covenant, considerably reducing her powers, while increasing those of the commissaire. Thus, the French reigned over the Kingdom of Tahiti. In 1863, they put an end to the British influence and replaced the British Protestant Missions with the Société des missions évangéliques de Paris (Society of Evangelical Missions of Paris).

=== Later 19th century ===
During the same period, about a thousand Chinese, mainly Cantonese, were recruited at the request of a plantation owner in Tahiti, William Stewart, to work on the great cotton plantation at Atimaono. When the enterprise went bankrupt in 1873, some Chinese workers returned to their country, but many stayed in Tahiti and integrated into the local population.

In 1866, the district councils were formed and elected, and given the powers of the traditional hereditary chiefs. In the context of republican assimilation, these councils sought to protect the traditional way of life of local people, which was threatened by European influence.

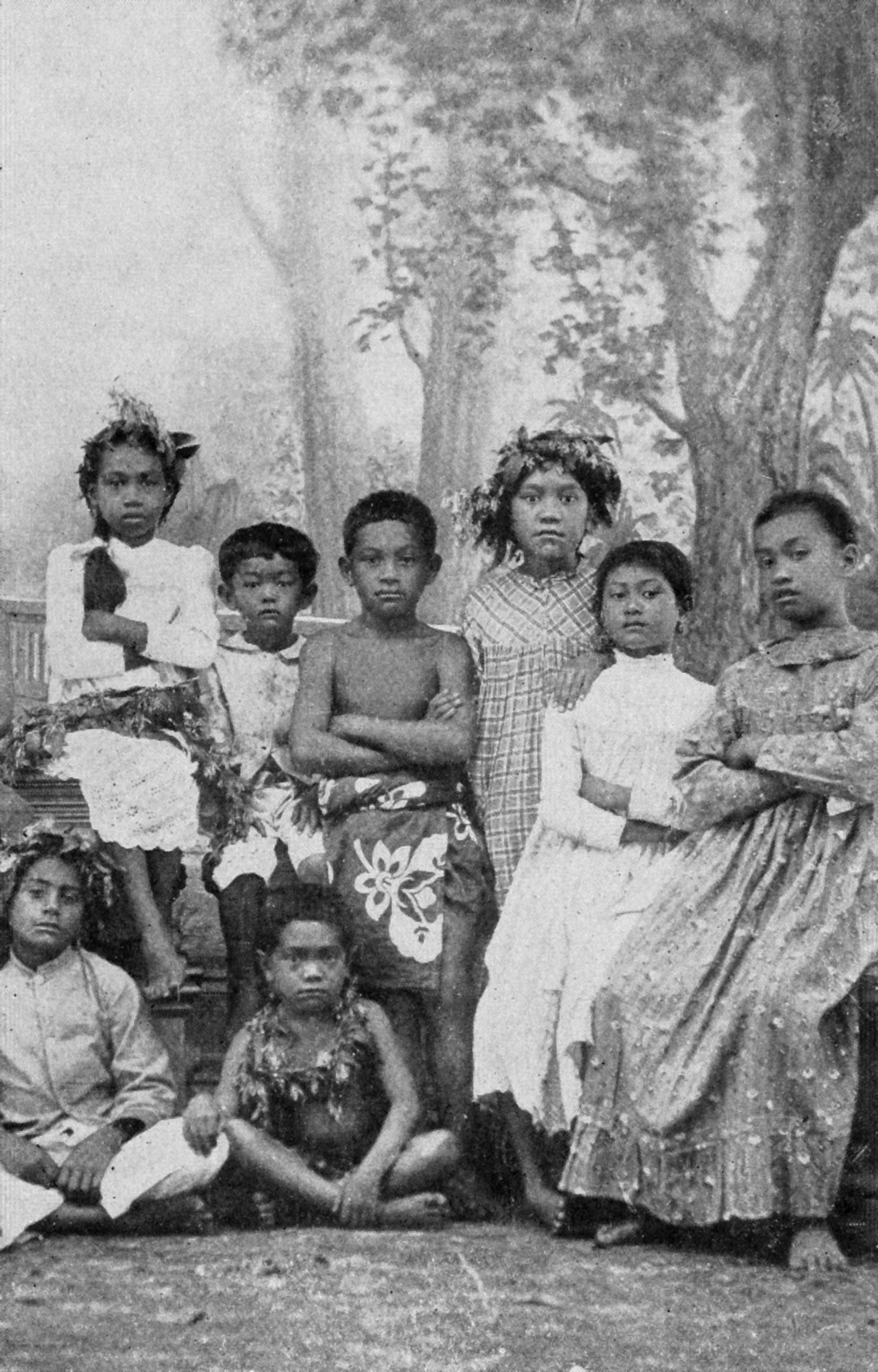
Tahitian children, c. 1906

In 1877, Queen Pōmare died after ruling for fifty years. Her son, Pōmare V, then succeeded her on the throne. The new king seemed little concerned with the affairs of the kingdom, and when, in 1880, the governor Henri Isidore Chessé, supported by the Tahitian chiefs, urged him to abdicate in favor of France, he accepted. On 29 June 1880, he ceded Tahiti to France along with the islands that were its dependencies. He was given the titular position of Officer of the Orders of the Legion of Honour and Agricultural Merit of France. Having become a colony, Tahiti thus lost all sovereignty. Tahiti was nevertheless a special colony, since all the subjects of the Kingdom of Pōmare would be given French citizenship. On 14 July 1881, among cries of "Vive la République!" the crowds celebrated the fact that Polynesia now belonged to France; this was the first celebration of the Tiurai (national and popular festival). In 1890, Papeʻete became a commune of the Republic of France.

The French painter Paul Gauguin lived on Tahiti in the 1890s and painted many Tahitian subjects. Papeari has a small Gauguin museum.

In 1891, Matthew Turner, an American shipbuilder from San Francisco who had been seeking a fast passage between the city and Tahiti, built Papeete, a two-masted schooner that made the trip in seventeen days.

=== Twentieth century to present ===
In 1903, the Établissements Français d'Océanie (French Establishments in Oceania) were created, which brought together Tahiti, the other Society Islands, the Austral Islands, the Marquesas Islands, and the Tuamotu Archipelago.

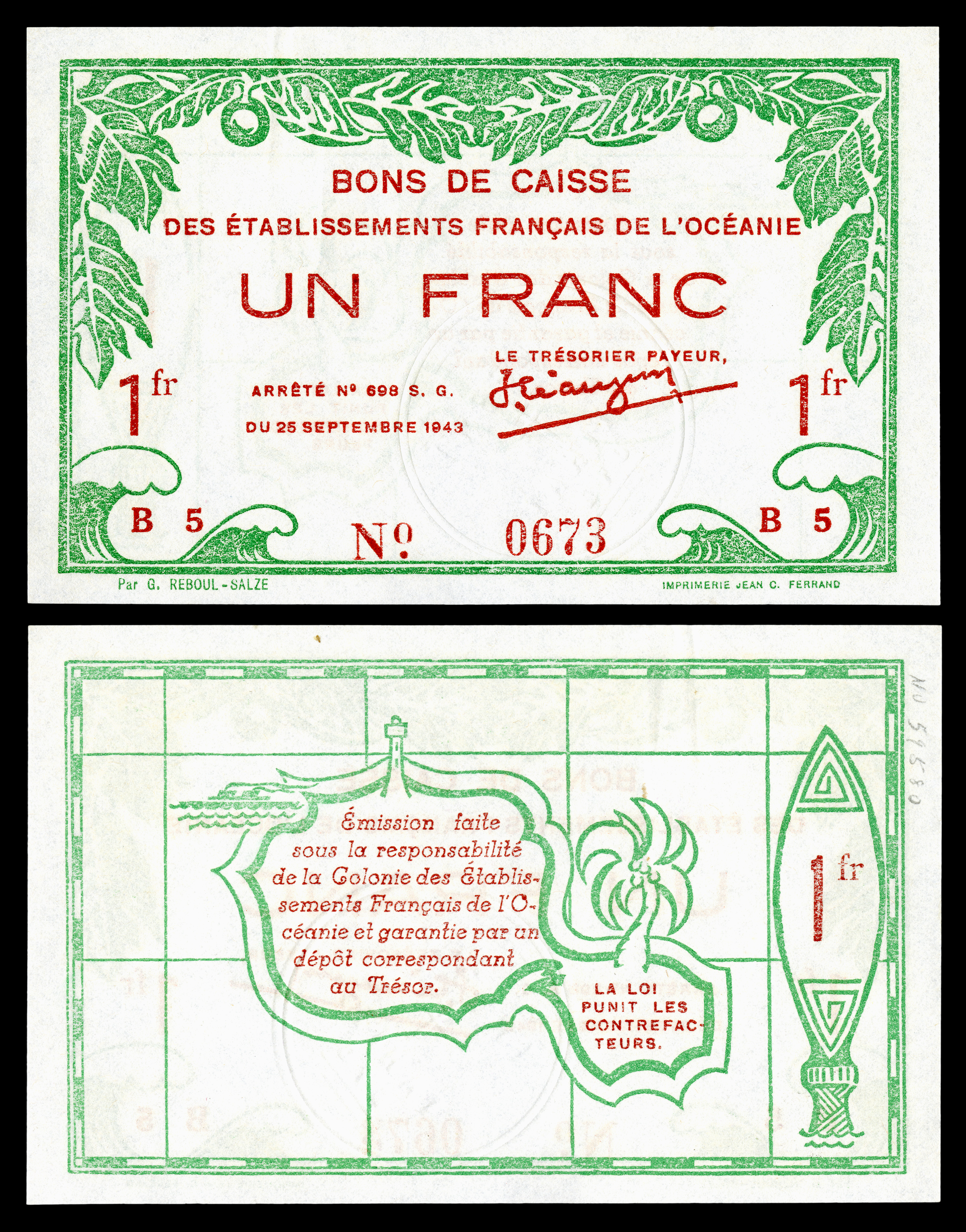
A one-franc World War II banknote (1943), printed in Papeʻete, depicting the outline of Tahiti on reverse

During the First World War, the Papeʻete region of the island was attacked by two German warships. A French gunboat as well as a captured German freighter were sunk in the harbour and the two German armoured cruisers bombarded the colony.

After the capitulation of France and establishment of the Vichy government, French citizens in Tahiti overwhelmingly voted for allegiance to the Free France of general de Gaulle in a unofficial referendum of 24 August 1940, thus choosing the Allies side in World War II.

In 1946, Tahiti and the whole of French Polynesia became an overseas territory (Territoire d'outre-mer). Tahitians were granted French citizenship, a right that had been campaigned for by nationalist leader Pouvanaʻa a Oopa for many years.

Faaʻa International Airport was opened on Tahiti in 1960.

Between 1966 and 1996, the French Government conducted 193 surface and underwater nuclear bomb tests at the atolls of Moruroa and Fangataufa. The last test was conducted on 27 January 1996.

On 17 July 1974, the French did a nuclear test over Mururoa Atoll, codenamed Centaure. Still, the atomic cloud and fallout did not take the direction planned. 42 hours later, the cloud reached Tahiti and the surrounding islands. As many as 111,000 people were affected. Reports showed that some people on Tahiti were exposed to 500 times the maximum allowed level for plutonium.

In 2003, French Polynesia's status was changed to that of an overseas collectivity (collectivité d'outre-mer), and in 2004 it was declared an overseas country (pays d'outre-mer or POM).

In 2009, Tauatomo Mairau claimed the Tahitian throne and attempted to reassert the monarchy's status in court.

== Politics and laws ==
Flag of French Polynesia

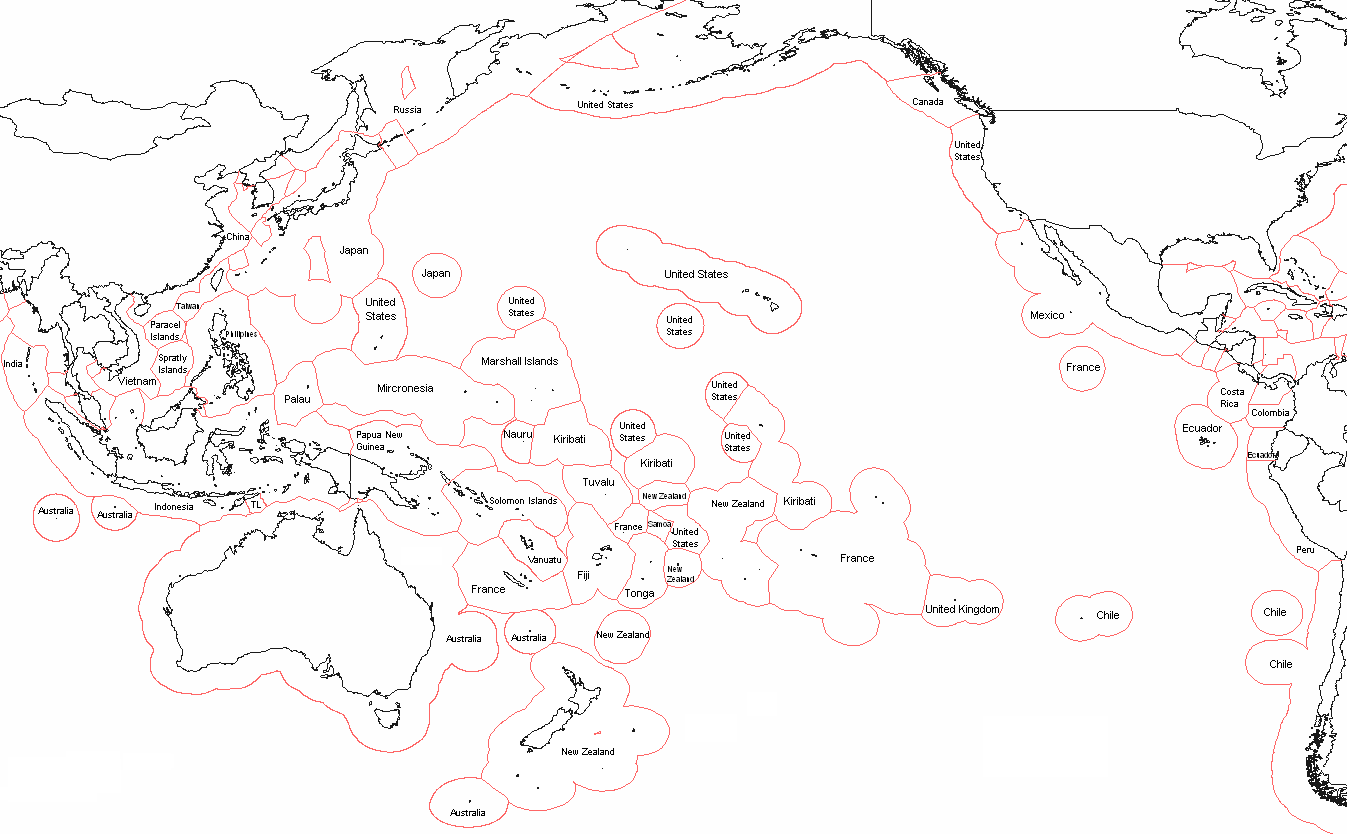
Political map of Oceania, showing EEZ borders

Tahiti is part of French Polynesia. French Polynesia is a semi-autonomous territory of France with its own assembly, president, budget, and laws. France's influence is limited to subsidies, education, and security.

Tahitians are French citizens with complete civil and political rights under France's constitution and other laws. French is the official language, but Tahitian and French are both in use. However, during the 1960s and 1970s, children were forbidden to speak Tahitian in schools. Tahitian is now taught in schools, and it is sometimes even a requirement for employment.

During a press conference on 26 June 2006, during the second France-Oceania Summit, French president Jacques Chirac said he did not think the majority of Tahitians wanted independence. He would keep the door open to a future referendum.

Elections for the Assembly of French Polynesia, the Territorial Assembly of French Polynesia, were held on 23 May 2004. In a surprise result, Oscar Temaru's pro-independence progressive coalition, Union for Democracy, formed a government with a one-seat majority in the 57-seat parliament, defeating the conservative party, Tāhōʻeraʻa Huiraʻatira, led by Gaston Flosse. On 8 October 2004, Flosse succeeded in passing a censure motion against the government, provoking a crisis. Flosse was removed from office in 2004 but was subsequently re-elected in 2008 after a period of political instability. His main rival, Oscar Temaru, served as the president of French Polynesia during multiple terms: 2004-2005, 2006-2008, and 2009-2013. He led the left-wing pro-independence party, Union for Democracy (UPLD). Temaru focused on greater autonomy for French Polynesia and called for independence.

== Demographics ==
The indigenous Tahitians are of Polynesian ancestry and make up 70% of the population alongside Europeans, East Asians (mostly Chinese), and people of mixed heritage, sometimes referred to as Demis.

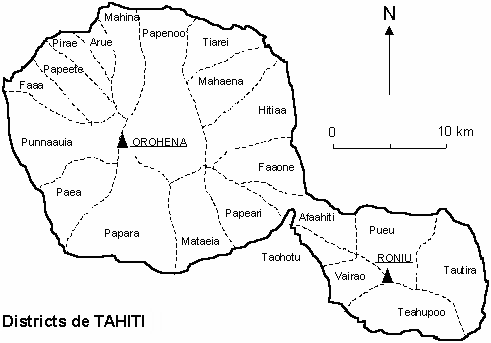

The places of birth of the 189,517 residents of the island of Tahiti at the 2017 census were the following:

- 75.4% were born in Tahiti (up from 71.5% at the 2007 census)
- 9.3% in Metropolitan France (down from 10.9% in 2007)
- 5.9% elsewhere in the Society Islands (down from 6.4% in 2007)
- 2.8% in the Tuamotu-Gambier (down from 3.3% in 2007)
- 1.8% in the Marquesas Islands (down from 2.0% in 2007)
- 1.6% in the Austral Islands (down from 2.0% in 2007)
- 1.3% in the overseas departments and territories of France other than French Polynesia (1.0% in New Caledonia and Wallis and Futuna; 0.3% in the other overseas departments and collectivities) (down from 1.6% in 2007)
- 0.5% in East and Southeast Asia (same percentage as in 2007)
- 0.3% in North Africa (most of them Pieds-Noirs) (down from 0.4% in 2007)
- 1.1% in other foreign countries (down from 1.5% in 2007)

Most people from metropolitan France live in Papeʻete and its suburbs, notably Punaʻauia, where they made up 16.8% of the population at the 2017 census, and Arue, where they made up 15.9%; these percentages do not include their children born in French Polynesia.

=== Historical population ===
1767	1797	1848	1897	1911	1921	1926	1931	1936	1941	1951
50,000 to 200,000	16,000	8,600	10,750	11,800	11,700	14,200	16,800	19,000	23,100	30,500
1956	1962	1971	1977	1983	1988	1996	2002	2007	2012	2017	2022
38,140	45,430	79,494	95,604	115,820	131,309	150,721	169,674	178,133	183,645	189,517	191,779
Official figures from past censuses.

== Administrative divisions ==
The island consists of 12 communes, which, along with Moʻorea-Maiʻao, make up the Windward Islands administrative subdivision.

The capital is Papeʻetē. The largest commune by population is Faʻaʻā, with Taiʻarapu-Est having the largest geographical area.

=== Communes of Tahiti ===
The following is a list of communes and their subdivisions sorted alphabetically:

Commune	Population 2022 Census	Area	Density 2022 Census	Subdivisions (with 2022 pop'n)	Notes
Arue	10,322	21.45 km^{2} (8.28 sq mi)	481/km^{2} (1,250/sq mi)		Tetiʻaroa, an atoll north of Arue, belongs to the commune.
Faʻaʻā	29,826	34.2 km^{2} (13.2 sq mi)	872/km^{2} (2,260/sq mi)		Largest commune (by population) in Tahiti and French Polynesia.
Hitiaʻa O Te Ra	10,196	218.2 km^{2} (84.2 sq mi)	47/km^{2} (120/sq mi)	Hitiaʻa (2,102), Mahaʻena (1,219), Papenoʻo (3,900), Tiarei (2,975)	The administrative centre of the commune is the settlement of Hitiaʻa.
Māhina	14,623	51.6 km^{2} (19.9 sq mi)	283/km^{2} (730/sq mi)		Close to the Papenoʻo River.
Pāʻea	12,756	64.5 km^{2} (24.9 sq mi)	198/km^{2} (510/sq mi)		
Paparā	11,743	92.5 km^{2} (35.7 sq mi)	127/km^{2} (330/sq mi)		
Papeʻetē	26,654	17.4 km^{2} (6.7 sq mi)	1,532/km^{2} (3,970/sq mi)		Capital of French Polynesia and 3rd largest commune.
Pīraʻe	14,068	35.4 km^{2} (13.7 sq mi)	397/km^{2} (1,030/sq mi)		Located between Papeʻete and Arue.
Punaʻauia	28,781	75.9 km^{2} (29.3 sq mi)	379/km^{2} (980/sq mi)		French painter Paul Gauguin lived in Punaʻauia in the 1890s. Punaʻauia is the 2nd largest commune in French Polynesia.
Taiʻarapu-Est	13,602	218.3 km^{2} (84.3 sq mi)	62/km^{2} (160/sq mi)	Afaʻahiti (6,829), Faʻaone (2,170), Pueu (2,076), Tautira (2,527)	Extends over northern half of the peninsula of Tahiti Iti. An offshore volcanic island called Mehetia belongs to the commune.
Taiʻarapu-Ouest	8,371	104.3 km^{2} (40.3 sq mi)	80/km^{2} (210/sq mi)	Teahupoʻo (1,455), Toahotu (3,925), Vairao (2,991)	Extends over southern half of the peninsula of Tahiti Iti.
Teva I Uta	10,837	119.5 km^{2} (46.1 sq mi)	91/km^{2} (240/sq mi)	Mataiea (5,391), Papeari (5,446)	The administrative centre of the commune is the settlement of Mataiea.

== Economy ==
Tourism is a significant industry, generating 17% of GDP before the COVID-19 pandemic.

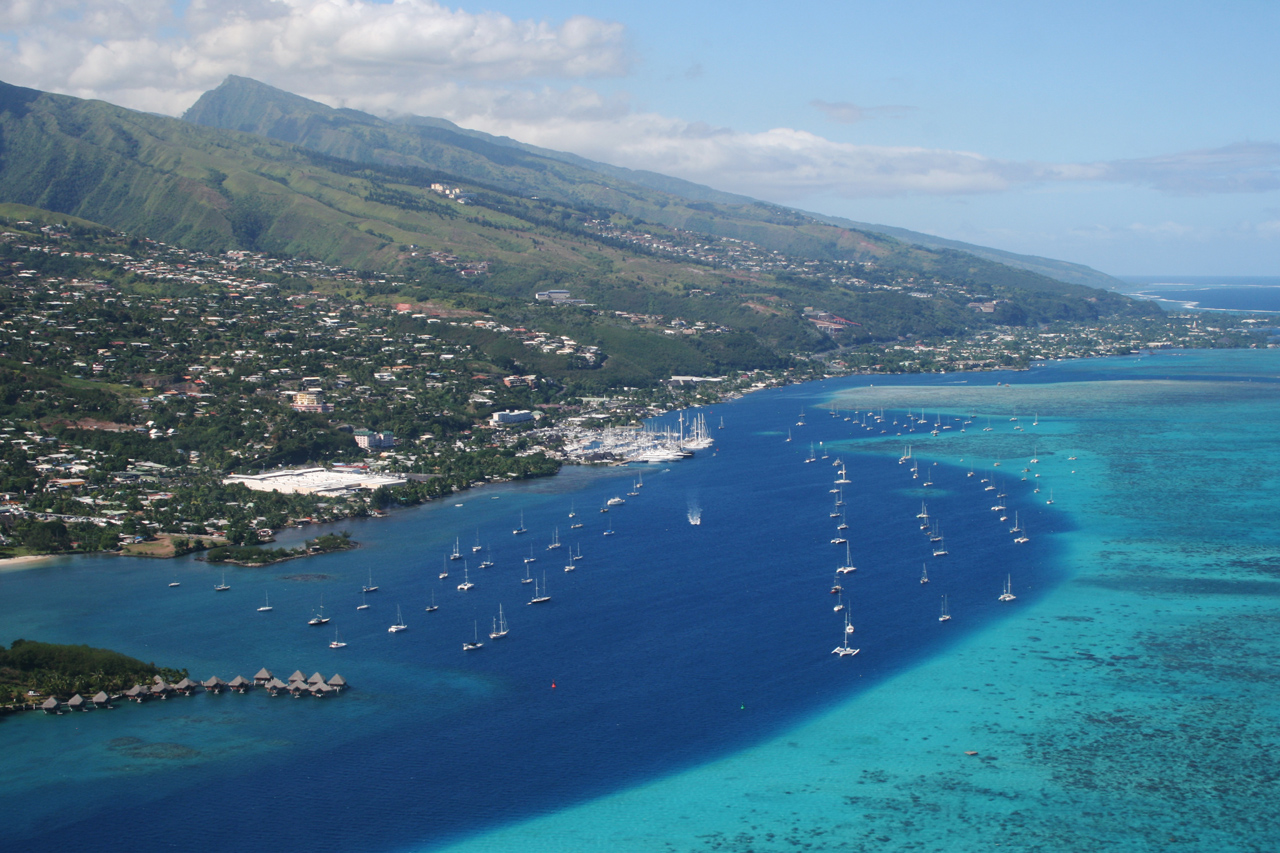
Southern suburbs of Papeʻete (commune of Punaʻauia)

The main trading partners are Metropolitan France for about 40% of imports and about 25% of exports. The other main trading partners are China, the US, South Korea, and New Zealand.

Tahitian pearl (Black pearl) farming is also a substantial source of revenue, with most pearls exported to Japan, Europe, and the United States. Tahiti also exports vanilla, fruits, flowers, monoi, fish, copra oil, and noni. Tahiti is also home to a single winery, whose vineyards are located on the Rangiroa atoll.

Unemployment affects about 15% of the active population, especially women and unqualified young people.

Tahiti's currency, the French Pacific Franc (CFP, also known as XPF), is pegged to the euro at 1 CFP=EUR .0084 (1 EUR=119.48 CFP, approx. 113 CFP to the United States dollar in November 2024). Hotels and financial institutions offer exchange services.

Sales tax in Tahiti is called Taxe sur la valeur ajoutée (TVA or value added tax (VAT) in English). VAT in 2009 was 10% on tourist services, and 6% on hotels, small boarding houses, food, and beverages. VAT on the purchase of goods and products is 16%.

=== Energy and electricity ===
French Polynesia imports its petroleum and has no local refinery or production capabilities. Daily consumption of imported oil products was 7,430 barrels in 2012 and 6,100 barrels per day in 2022, according to the US Energy Information Administration. The utility EDT operates hydroelectric plants, solar plants, and a 10 MWh battery to reduce oil demand.

== Culture ==
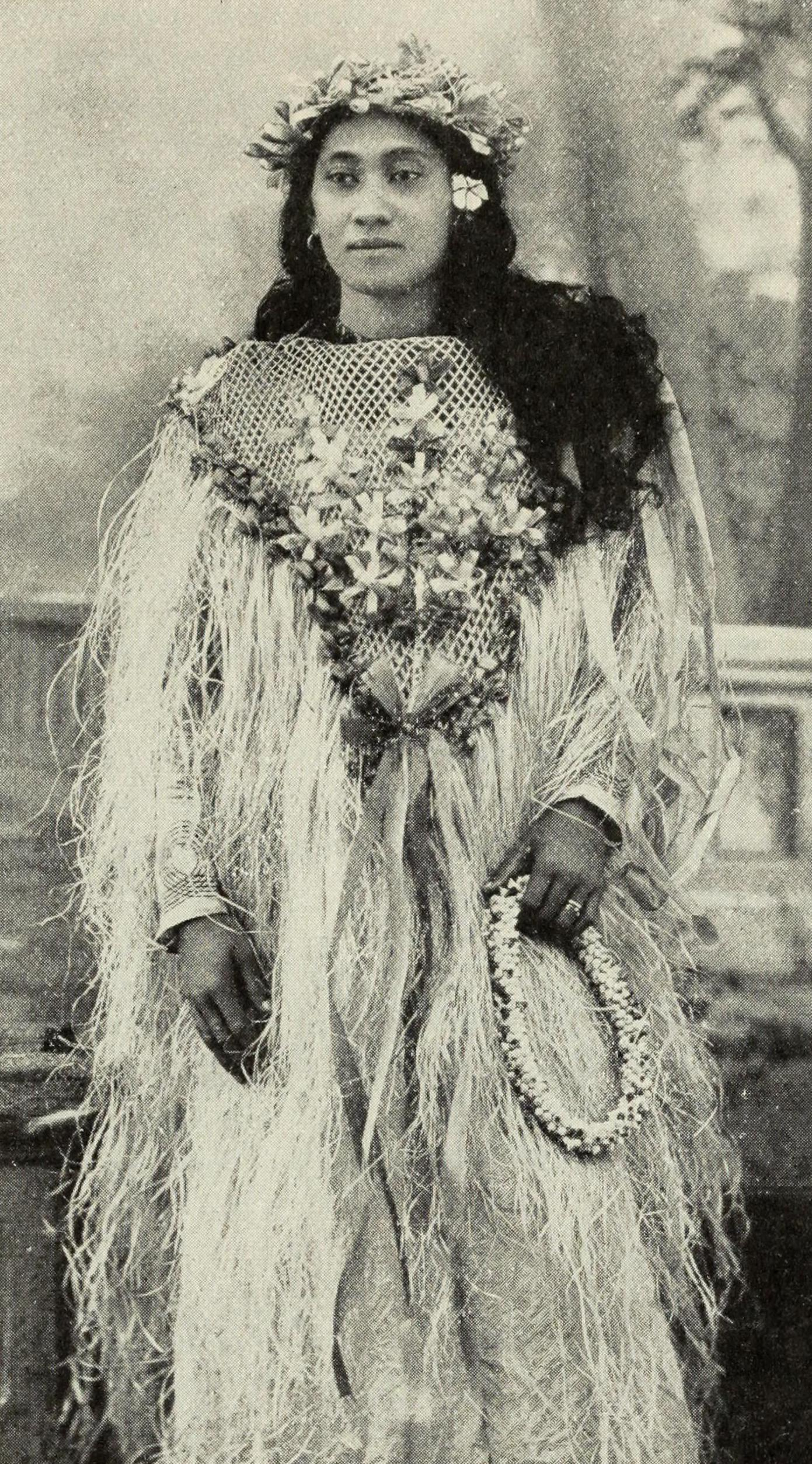
Tahitian woman in festive costume, c. 1906

As mentioned in the records of Captain Cook's visits, breadfruit is a staple crop. One main way of preparing it is documented in Joseph Banks' diaries: after it is very ripe, breadfruit can be buried in leaf-lined pits with weights placed on top of it, to allow it to ferment into a sour paste known as mahie.

=== Art ===
Tahitian cultures included an oral tradition that involved the mythology of gods, such as ʻOro and beliefs, as well as ancient traditions such as tattooing and navigation. The annual Heivā I Tahiti Festival in July is a celebration of traditional culture, dance, music, and sports, including a long-distance race between the islands of French Polynesia, in modern outrigger canoes (vaʻa).

The Paul Gauguin Museum is dedicated to the life and works of French artist Paul Gauguin (1848–1903) who resided in Tahiti for years and painted such works as Two Tahitian Women, Tahitian Women on the Beach, and Where Do We Come From? What Are We? Where Are We Going?

The Musée de Tahiti et des Îles (Museum of Tahiti and the Islands) is in Punaʻauia. It is an ethnographic museum founded in 1974 to conserve and restore Polynesian artifacts and cultural practices.

The Robert Wan Pearl Museum is the world's only museum dedicated to pearls. The Papeʻete Market sells local arts and crafts.

=== Dance ===
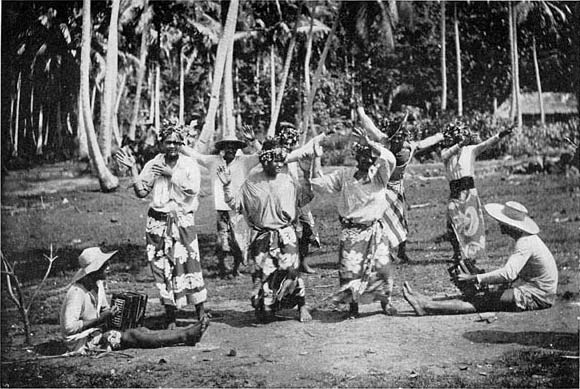
Tahitians wearing the pareo wrap-around garment and practising a ʻupaʻupa dance

Traditional Tahitian "Ute" or song performed by Tefanake, Reia, and Moratai, recorded in 1950

One of the most widely recognised images of the islands is the world-famous Tahitian dance. The ʻōteʻa (sometimes written as otea) is a traditional dance from Tahiti, where the dancers, standing in several rows, execute figures. This dance, easily recognized by its fast hip shaking and grass skirts, is often confused with the Hawaiʻian hula, a generally slower, more graceful dance that emphasizes the hands and storytelling over the hips.

The ʻōteʻa is one of the few Tahitian men's dances that existed before European contact. On the other hand, the hura (Tahitian vernacular for hula), a dance for women, has disappeared, and the couples' dance ʻupaʻupa is likewise gone but may have re-emerged as the tamure. Nowadays, the ʻōteʻa can be danced by men (ʻōteʻa tāne), by women (ʻōteʻa vahine), or by both genders (ʻōteʻa ʻāmui, "united ʻō"). This dance is accompanied only by instruments, particularly drums; there is no singing. The drum is one of the types of the tōʻere, a wooden log with a longitudinal slit that is struck with one or two sticks. Or it can be the pahu, the ancient Tahitian standing drum covered with sharkskin and struck with the hands or sticks. The rhythm from the tōʻere is fast; from the pahu it is slower. A smaller drum, the faʻatete, can also be used.

The dancers make gestures that re-enact daily occupations of life. For men, themes can include warfare or sailing, and they may use spears or paddles during these dances.

For women, the themes are closer to home or from nature: combing their hair or the flight of a butterfly, for example. More elaborate themes can be chosen, for example, one where the dancers end up portraying a map of Tahiti, highlighting important places. In a proper ʻōteʻa, the whole dance should be one story on a single theme.

The group dance called ʻaparima is often performed with the dancers dressed in pareo and maro. There are two types of ʻaparima: the ʻaparima hīmene (sung handdance) and the ʻaparima vāvā (silent handdance), the latter of which is accompanied by instruments without any singing.

Newer dances include the hivinau and the pāʻōʻā.

=== Death ===
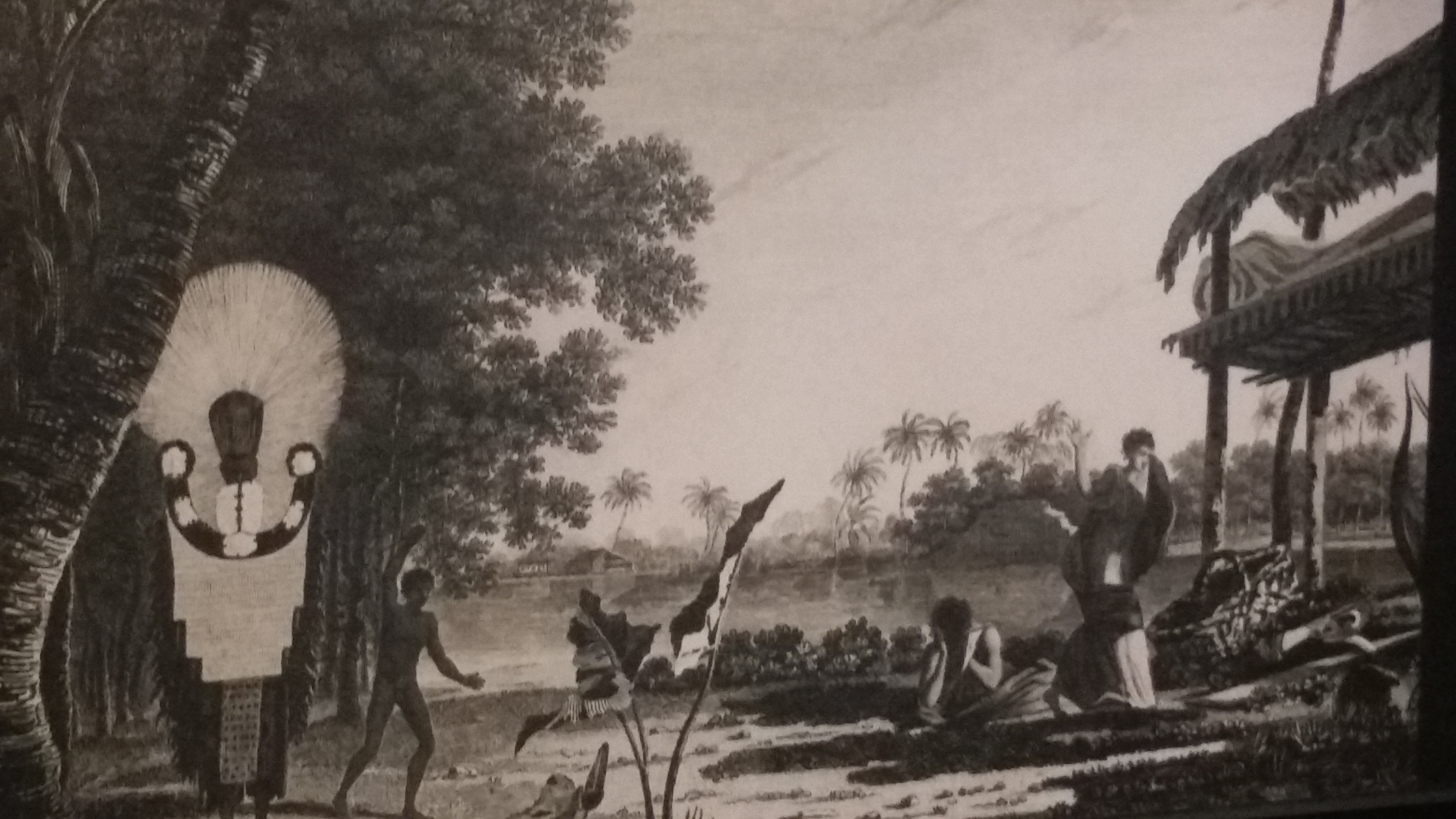
W. Woolett engraving after William Hodges of a toupapow, or funeral bier, and Chief Mourner, from Cook's 2nd voyage to Tahiti

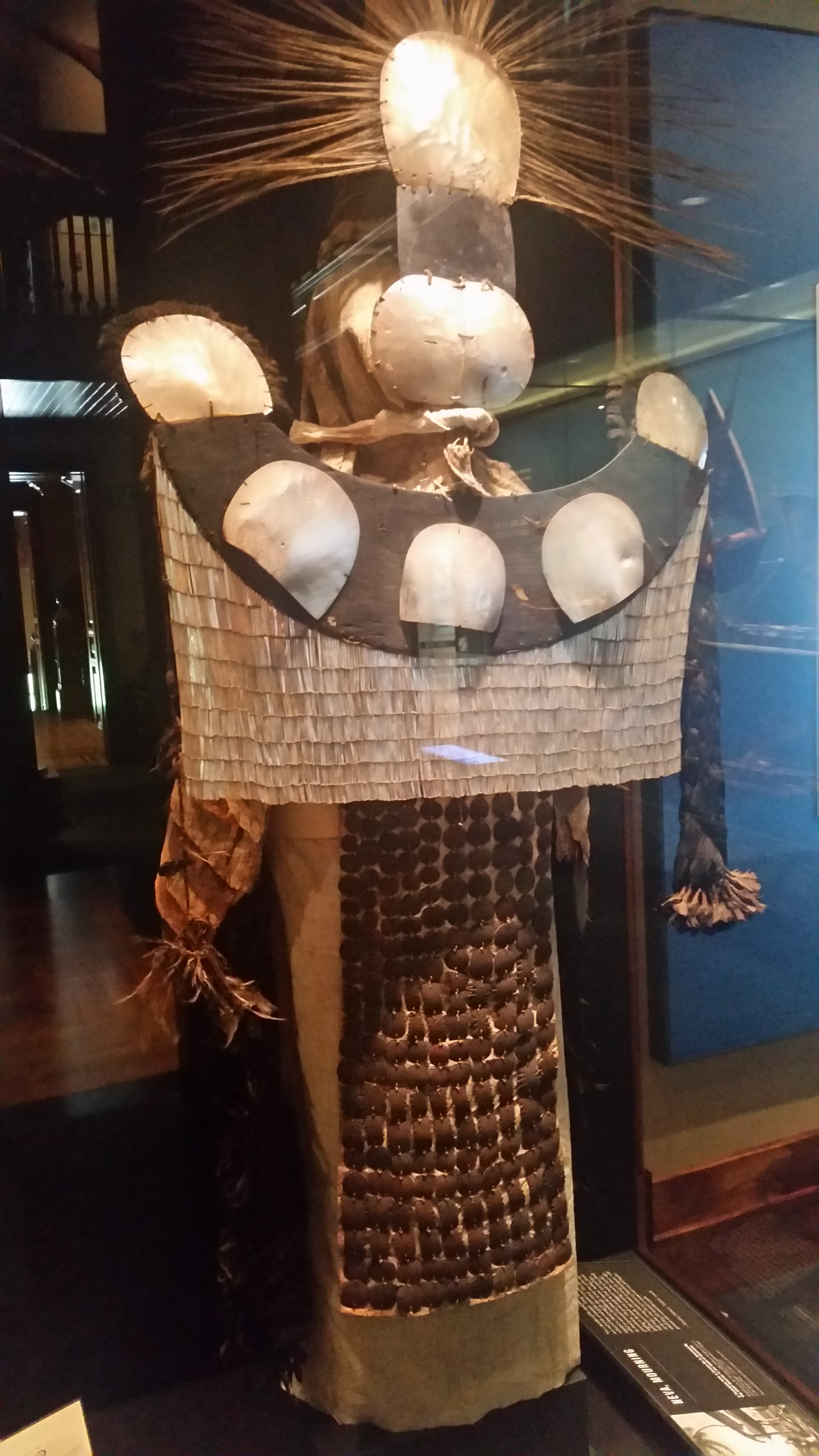
Tahitian Parae, or Chief Mourner costume, on display in the Bishop Museum

The Tahitians believed in the afterlife, a paradise called Rohutu-noʻanoʻa. When a Tahitian died, the corpse was wrapped in barkcloth and placed on a funeral bier, fare tupapa ʻu, which was a raised canoe awning on posts surrounded by bamboo. Food for the gods was placed nearby to prevent them from eating the body, which would condemn the spirit to the underworld. Mourners would slash themselves with a shark's teeth and smear the blood on barkcloth placed nearby. Most importantly, the chief mourner donned the parae, an elaborate costume that included an iridescent mask made of four polished pearl shell discs. One disk was black, signifying Po, the spirit world, while one was white, signifying Ao, the world of people. A crown of red feathers signified ʻOro. A curved wooden board, pautu, below the mask contained five polished pearl shells, which signified Hina, the moon goddess. Hanging below were more shells in rows, ahu-parau, representing the Pleiades, believed to be the eyes of former chiefs. Finally, a ceremonial garment, tiputa, covered the body and was decorated with an apron of polished coconut shells, ahu-ʻaipu.

=== Sport ===
The Tahitian national sport is Vaʻa. In English, this paddle sport is also known as outrigger canoe. The Tahitians consistently set record-breaking times as world champions in this sport.

Major sports in Tahiti include rugby union and association football, and the island has fielded a national basketball team, which is a member of FIBA Oceania.

Another sport is surfing, with famous surfers such as Malik Joyeux and Michel Bourez. Teahupoʻo is one of the deadliest surf breaks in the world.

Rugby union in Tahiti is governed by the Fédération Tahitienne de Rugby de Polynésie Française which was formed in 1989. The Tahiti national rugby union team has been active since 1971, but has played only 12 games since then.

Football in Tahiti is administered by the Fédération Tahitienne de Football and was founded in 1938. The Tahiti Division Fédérale is the top division on the island, and the Tahiti Championnat Enterprise is the second tier. Some of the major clubs are AS Manu-Ura, who play in Stade Hamuta, AS Pirae, who play in the Stade Pater Te Hono Nui, and AS Tefana, who play in the Stade Louis Ganivet. Lesser clubs include Matavai. In 2012, the national team won the OFC Nations Cup, qualifying for the 2013 FIFA Confederations Cup in Brazil and becoming the first team other than Australia or New Zealand to win it.

The Tahiti Cup is the islands' premier football knockout tournament and has been played for since 1938. The winner of the Tahiti Cup goes on to play the winner of the Tahiti Division Fédérale in the Tahiti Coupe des Champions.

In 2010, Tahiti was chosen as the host of the 2013 FIFA Beach Soccer World Cup, which was held in September 2013. The national team reached the semifinals. They achieved even more success in subsequent editions, the 2015 and 2017, where they reached the final on both occasions.

Tahiti has also been represented at the World Championship of Pétanque. They are the pre-eminent country in Oceania for Pétanque, undoubtedly due to their strong ties to France.

As part of the 2024 Summer Olympics, Tahiti hosted the surfing competition. It was the only sport held outside metropolitan France, as Paris, located 15,716 kilometres (9,765 mi) away, hosts the international competition. The Men's Shortboard gold medal was won by Tahitian Kauli Vaast.

=== Film ===
Tahiti is depicted in the biography of Paul Gauguin in the 2017 French film Gauguin: Voyage to Tahiti portraying his life during his years on Tahiti.

Also linked to Tahiti are the various films narrating the story of the 1789 mutiny on HMS Bounty – e.g. Mutiny on the Bounty (1962) with actor Marlon Brando, The Bounty (1984) with Mel Gibson.

A more recent movie is the 2022 thriller film, Pacifiction, related to French nuclear testing in the area.

== Education ==
Tahiti is home to the University of French Polynesia (Université de la Polynésie Française). It is a growing university, with 3,200 students and 62 researchers. Courses are available in law, commerce, science, and literature. There are also high schools, including the Catholic Collège La Mennais located in Papeʻete.

== Notable people ==
- Aline Amaru (born 1941), textile artist
- Mauatua (c.1764–1841), tapa weaver
- Titaua Peu (born 1975), novelist
- Farahia Teuiria (born 1972), footballer
- Kauli Vaast (born 2002), Olympic Surfer
- Pascal Vahirua (born 1966), French footballer
- Marama Vahirua (born 1980), French-Tahitian footballer

== Transport ==
=== Air ===
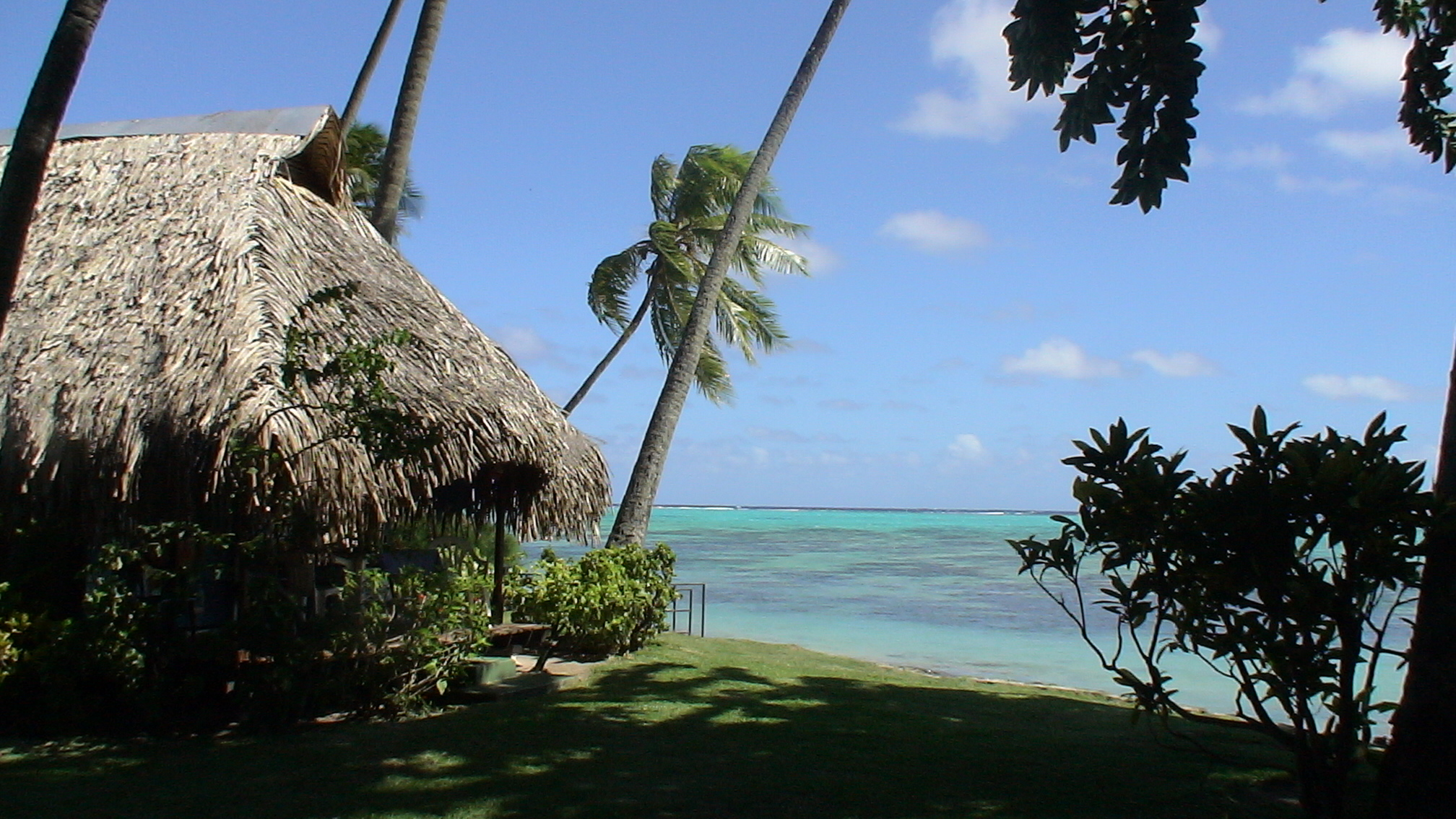
Tahitian coast

Faʻaʻā International Airport is located 5 km (3.1 mi) from Papeʻete in the commune of Faʻaʻā and is the only international airport in French Polynesia. Because of the limited terrain, rather than leveling large stretches of sloping agricultural land, the airport is built primarily on reclaimed land reclaimed from the coral reef just offshore.

International destinations such as Auckland, Honolulu, Los Angeles, Paris, San Francisco, Sydney and Tokyo are served by Air France, Air New Zealand, Air Tahiti Nui French Polynesia's flag carrier, Hawaiʻian Airlines, United Airlines, and French Bee.

Flights within French Polynesia and to New Caledonia are available from Aircalin and Air Tahiti; Air Tahiti has its headquarters at the airport.

=== Ferry ===
The Moʻorea Ferry operates from Papeʻete and takes about 45 minutes to travel to Moʻorea. Other ferries are the Aremiti 5 and the Aremiti 7, which sail to Moʻorea in about half an hour. Several ferries transport people and goods throughout the islands. The Bora Bora cruiseline sails to Bora Bora about once a week. The main hub for these ferries is the Papeʻete Wharf.

=== Roads ===
Tahiti has a freeway that runs across its west coast, starting in Arue and continuing across the Papeʻete urban area. From there, it continues along the west coast of Tahiti Nui through smaller villages and turns east toward Taravao, where Tahiti Nui meets Tahiti Iti. The freeway transitions into a thin paved road at Teahupoʻo.

=== Emergency ===
The Joint Rescue Coordination Centre (JRCC) Tahiti watches out for emergency signals and coordinates search and rescue in a certain world area.

== See also ==
- Cultural variations in adoption § Polynesia
- List of volcanoes in French Polynesia
- Nuclear-free zone
- Omoo
- Postage stamps and postal history of French Polynesia

== Bibliography ==
- Nadeije Laneyrie-Dagen (1996). Les grands explorateurs, sous la direction de Nadeije Laneyrie-Dagen. Larousse. p. 148. ISBN 2-03-505305-6.
- Bernard Salvat; Eric Conte; François Merceron; Michel-Claude Touchard (2006). Tahiti et les îles de la Société: Polynésie. Gallimard Loisirs. ISBN 978-2-7424-1917-3.
