= Outline of French Polynesia =

French overseas collectivity

The Flag of French Polynesia

The Coat of arms of French Polynesia

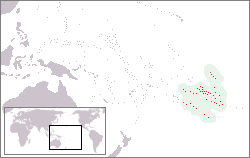
The location of French Polynesia

An enlargeable map of the French Overseas Collectivity of French Polynesia

The following outline is provided as an overview of and topical guide to French Polynesia:

French Polynesia – French overseas collectivity located in the South Pacific Ocean. It is made up of several groups of Polynesian islands, the most famous island being Tahiti in the Society Islands group, which is also the most populous island and the seat of the capital of the territory (Papeete). Although not an integral part of its territory, Clipperton Island was administered from French Polynesia until 2007.

== General reference ==
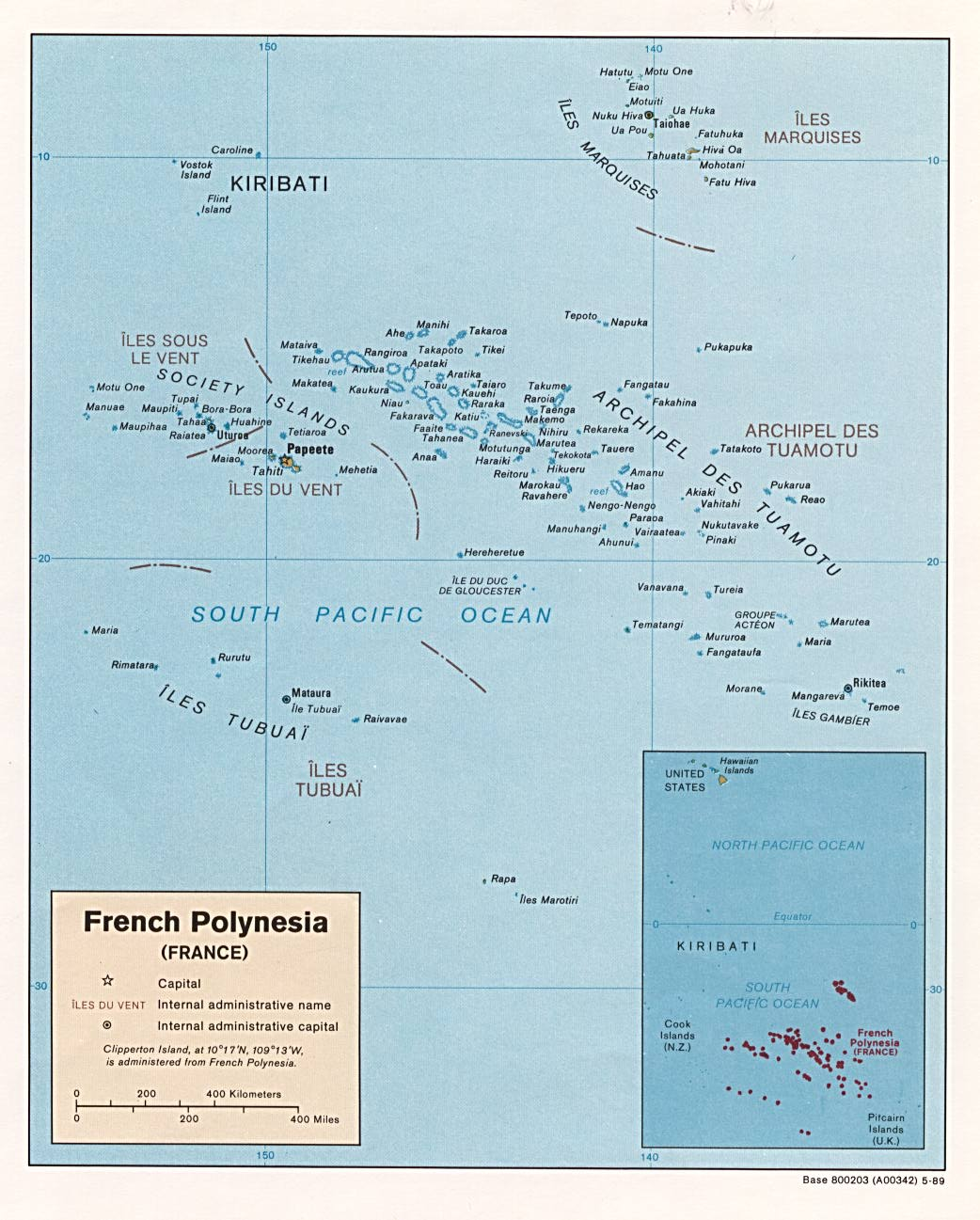
An enlargeable map of French Polynesia

- Pronunciation: /ˌfrɛntʃ pɒlɪˈniːʒə/
- Common English country name: French Polynesia
- Official English country name: The French Overseas Collectivity of French Polynesia
- Common endonym(s): Polynésie française (French), Pōrīnetia farāni (Tahitian), Fenua mā’ohi (Tahitian)
- Official endonym(s):
- Adjectival(s): French Polynesian
- Demonym(s):
- Etymology: Name of French Polynesia
- ISO country codes: PF, PYF, 258
- ISO region codes: See ISO 3166-2:PF
- Internet country code top-level domain: .pf

== Geography of French Polynesia ==
An enlargeable hydrographic map of French Polynesia

Geography of French Polynesia

- French Polynesia is: a territory of France
- Location:
  - Southern Hemisphere and Eastern Hemisphere
  - Pacific Ocean
    - South Pacific Ocean
      - Oceania
        - Polynesia
  - Time zones:
    - Gambier Islands – UTC-09
    - Marquesas Islands - UTC-09:30
    - Rest of French Polynesia – UTC-10
  - Extreme points of French Polynesia
    - High: Mont Orohena 2,241 m (7,352 ft)
    - Low: South Pacific Ocean 0 m
  - Land boundaries: none
  - Coastline: 2,525 km
- Population of French Polynesia: 259,596 (August 20, 2007) - —th most populous country
- Area of French Polynesia: 4,167 km^{2}
- Atlas of French Polynesia

=== Environment of French Polynesia ===
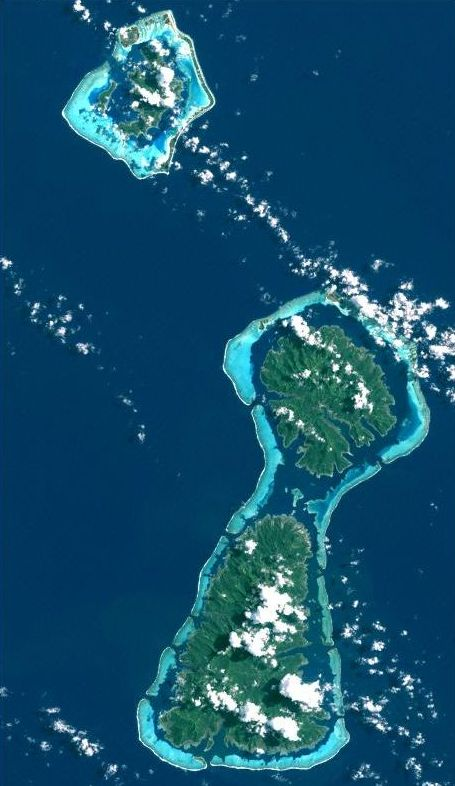
An enlargeable satellite image of the islands of Bora Bora, Tahaa, and Raiatea in French Polynesia

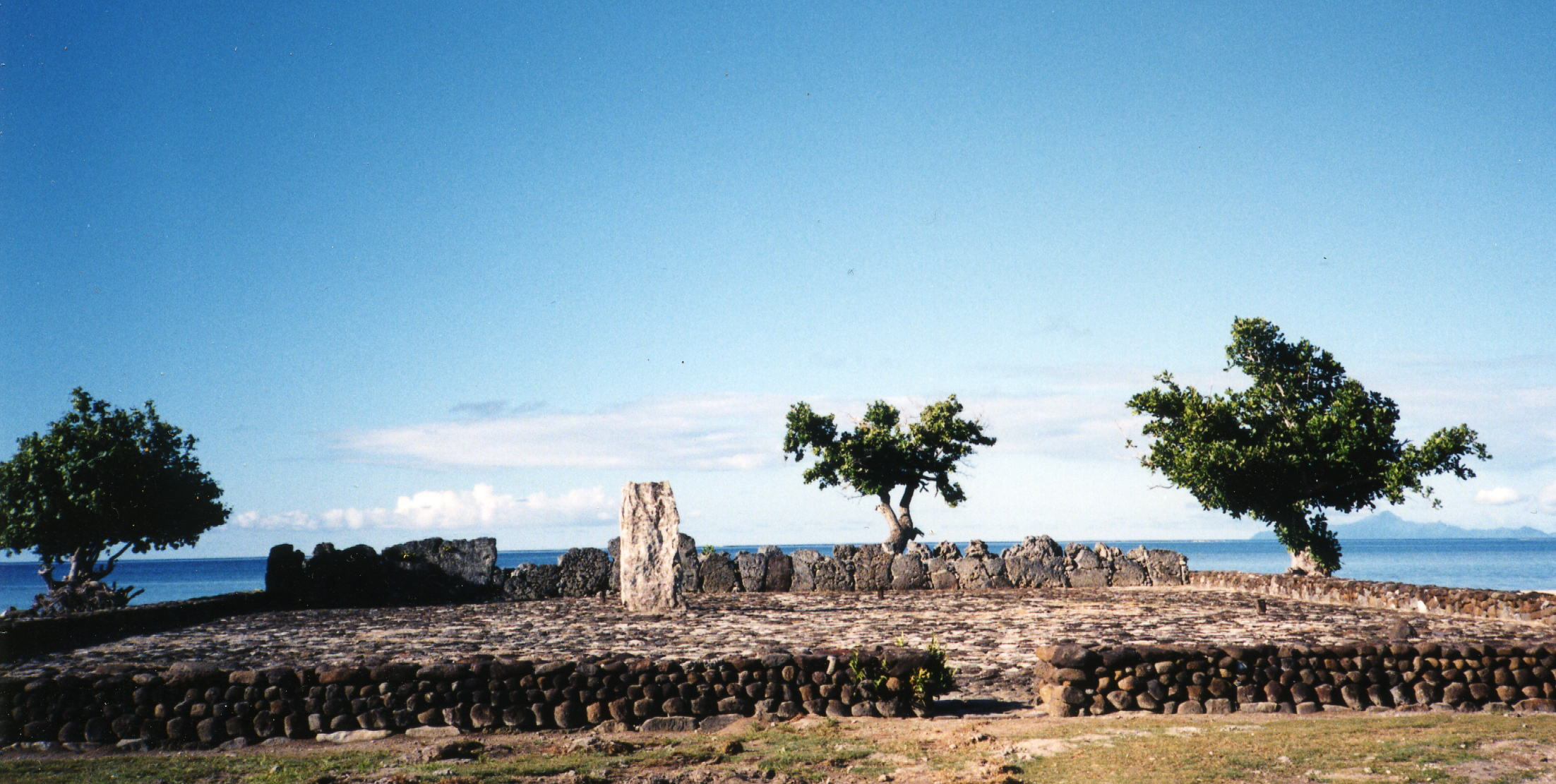
View of a marae at the archaeological complex of Taputapuatea marae

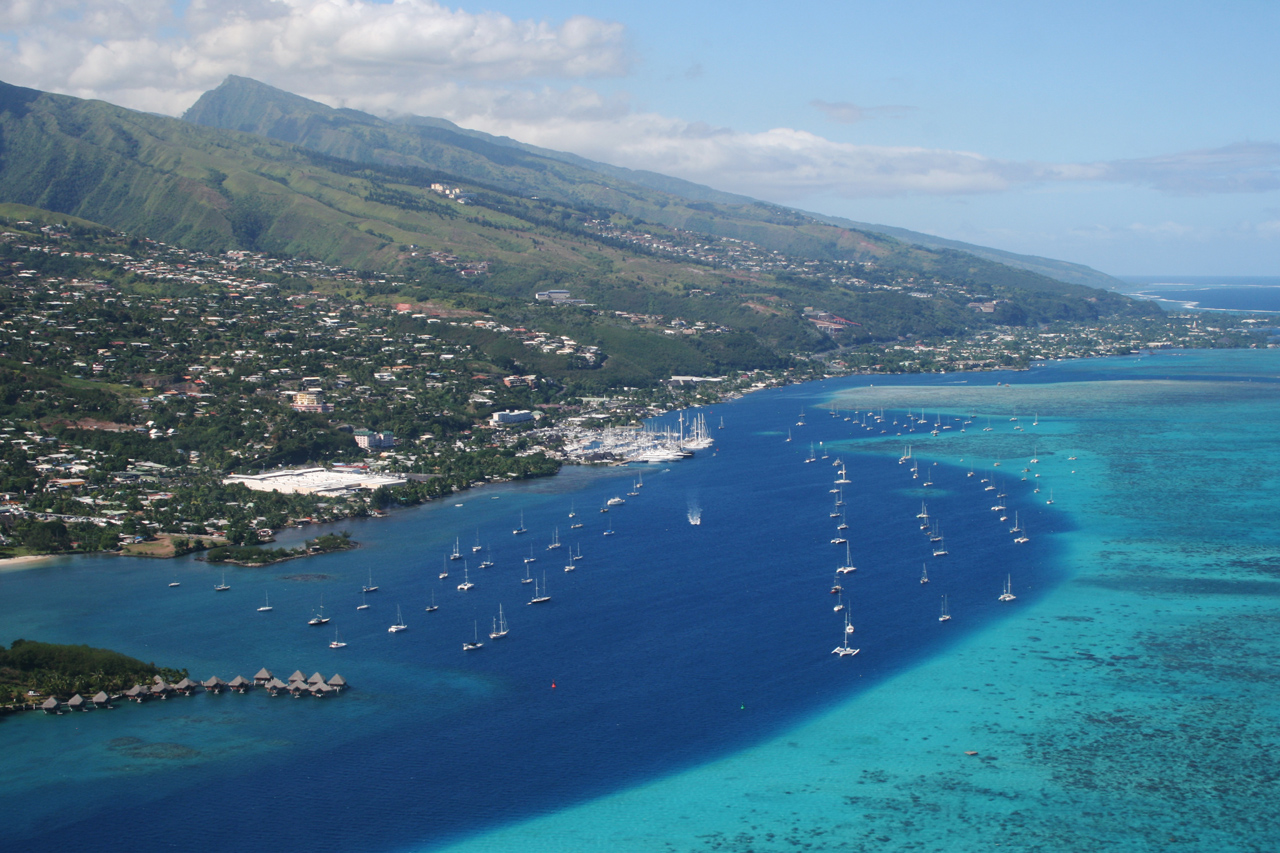
Papeete, the capital of French Polynesia

- Climate of French Polynesia
- Renewable energy in French Polynesia
- Geology of French Polynesia
- Protected areas of French Polynesia
  - Biosphere reserves in French Polynesia
  - National parks of French Polynesia
- Wildlife of French Polynesia
  - Fauna of French Polynesia
    - Birds of French Polynesia
    - Mammals of French Polynesia

==== Natural geographic features of French Polynesia ====
- Atolls of French Polynesia
- Fjords of French Polynesia
- Islands of French Polynesia
- Lakes of French Polynesia
- Mountains of French Polynesia
  - Volcanoes in French Polynesia
- Rivers of French Polynesia
  - Waterfalls of French Polynesia
- Valleys of French Polynesia
- World Heritage Sites in French Polynesia
  - Taputapuatea marae

=== Regions of French Polynesia ===
Regions of French Polynesia

==== Ecoregions of French Polynesia ====
List of ecoregions in French Polynesia

==== Administrative divisions of French Polynesia ====
Administrative divisions of French Polynesia

- Provinces of French Polynesia
  - Districts of French Polynesia
    - Municipalities of French Polynesia

===== Provinces of French Polynesia =====
Provinces of French Polynesia

===== Districts of French Polynesia =====
Districts of French Polynesia

===== Municipalities of French Polynesia =====
Municipalities of French Polynesia

- Capital of French Polynesia: Papeete
- Cities of French Polynesia

=== Demography of French Polynesia ===
Demographics of French Polynesia

== Government and politics of French Polynesia ==
Politics of French Polynesia

- Form of government: parliamentary representative democratic French overseas collectivity
- Capital of French Polynesia: Papeete
- Elections in French Polynesia
- Political parties in French Polynesia

=== Branches of the government of French Polynesia ===
Government of French Polynesia

==== Executive branch of the government of French Polynesia ====
- Head of state: President of French Polynesia,
- Head of government: Prime Minister of French Polynesia,
- Cabinet of French Polynesia

==== Legislative branch of the government of French Polynesia ====
- Parliament of French Polynesia (bicameral)
  - Upper house: Senate of French Polynesia
  - Lower house: House of Commons of French Polynesia

==== Judicial branch of the government of French Polynesia ====
Court system of French Polynesia

- Supreme Court of French Polynesia

=== Foreign relations of French Polynesia ===
Foreign relations of French Polynesia

- Diplomatic missions in French Polynesia
- Diplomatic missions of French Polynesia

==== International organization membership ====
The government of French Polynesia is a member of:

- Conference des Ministres des Finances des Pays de la Zone Franc (FZ)
- International Trade Union Confederation (ITUC)
- Pacific Islands Forum (PIF) (associate member)
- Secretariat of the Pacific Community (SPC)
- Universal Postal Union (UPU)
- World Meteorological Organization (WMO)

=== Law and order in French Polynesia ===
Law of French Polynesia

- Constitution of French Polynesia
- Crime in French Polynesia
- Human rights in French Polynesia
  - LGBT rights in French Polynesia
  - Freedom of religion in French Polynesia
- Law enforcement in French Polynesia

=== Military of French Polynesia ===
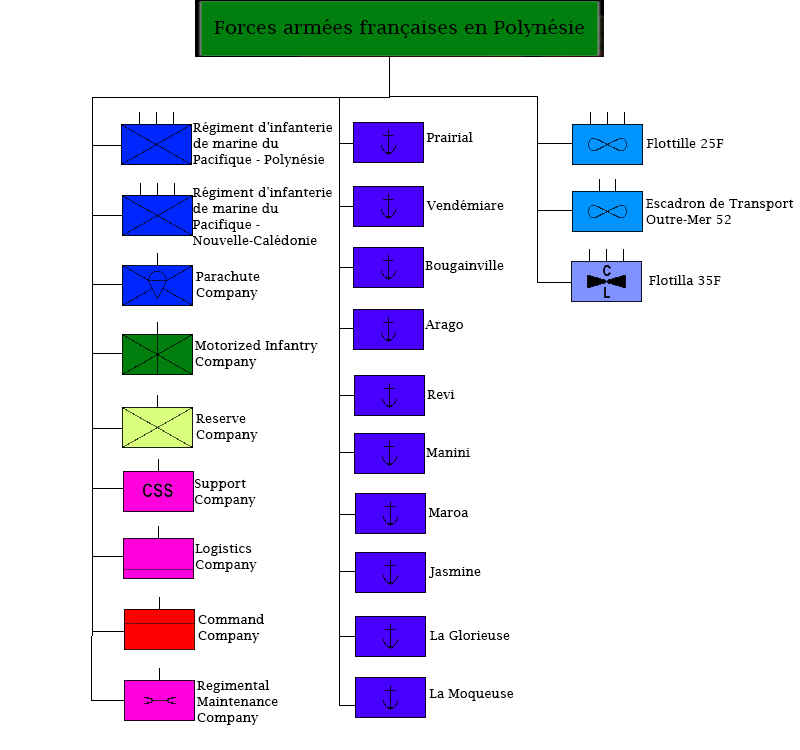
Forces armées françaises en Polynésie

Military of French Polynesia

- Command
  - Commander-in-chief:
    - Ministry of Defence of French Polynesia
- Forces
  - Army of French Polynesia
  - Navy of French Polynesia
  - Air Force of French Polynesia
  - Special forces of French Polynesia
- Military history of French Polynesia
- Military ranks of French Polynesia

=== Local government in French Polynesia ===
Local government in French Polynesia

== History of French Polynesia ==
History of French Polynesia

- Timeline of the history of French Polynesia
- Current events of French Polynesia
- Military history of French Polynesia

== Culture of French Polynesia ==
Culture of French Polynesia

- Architecture of French Polynesia
- Cuisine of French Polynesia
- Festivals in French Polynesia
- Languages of French Polynesia
- Media in French Polynesia
  - Television in French Polynesia
- National symbols of French Polynesia
  - Coat of arms of French Polynesia
  - Flag of French Polynesia
  - National anthem of French Polynesia
- People of French Polynesia
- Public holidays in French Polynesia
- Records of French Polynesia
- Religion in French Polynesia
  - Christianity in French Polynesia
  - Hinduism in French Polynesia
  - Islam in French Polynesia
  - Judaism in French Polynesia
  - Sikhism in French Polynesia
- World Heritage Sites in French Polynesia: None

=== Art in French Polynesia ===
- Art in French Polynesia
- Cinema of French Polynesia
- Literature of French Polynesia
- Music of French Polynesia
- Theatre in French Polynesia

=== Sports in French Polynesia ===
Sports in French Polynesia

- Football in French Polynesia
- Polynesia at the Olympics

== Economy and infrastructure of French Polynesia ==
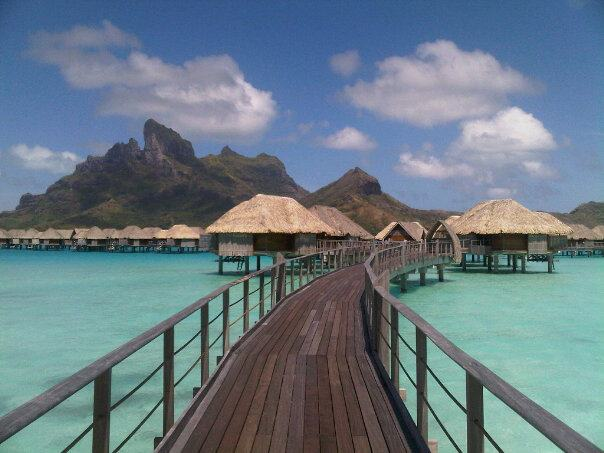
Four Seasons Resort Bora Bora

Economy of French Polynesia

- Economic rank, by nominal GDP (2007): 142nd (one hundred and forty second)
- Agriculture in French Polynesia
- Banking in French Polynesia
  - National Bank of French Polynesia
- Communications in French Polynesia
  - Internet in French Polynesia
- Companies of French Polynesia
- Currency of French Polynesia: Franc
  - ISO 4217: XPF
- Energy in French Polynesia
  - Energy policy of French Polynesia
  - Oil industry in French Polynesia
- Mining in French Polynesia
- Tourism in French Polynesia
  - Visa policy of the French overseas departments and territories
- Transport in French Polynesia
- French Polynesia Stock Exchange

== Education in French Polynesia ==
Education in French Polynesia

== Infrastructure of French Polynesia ==
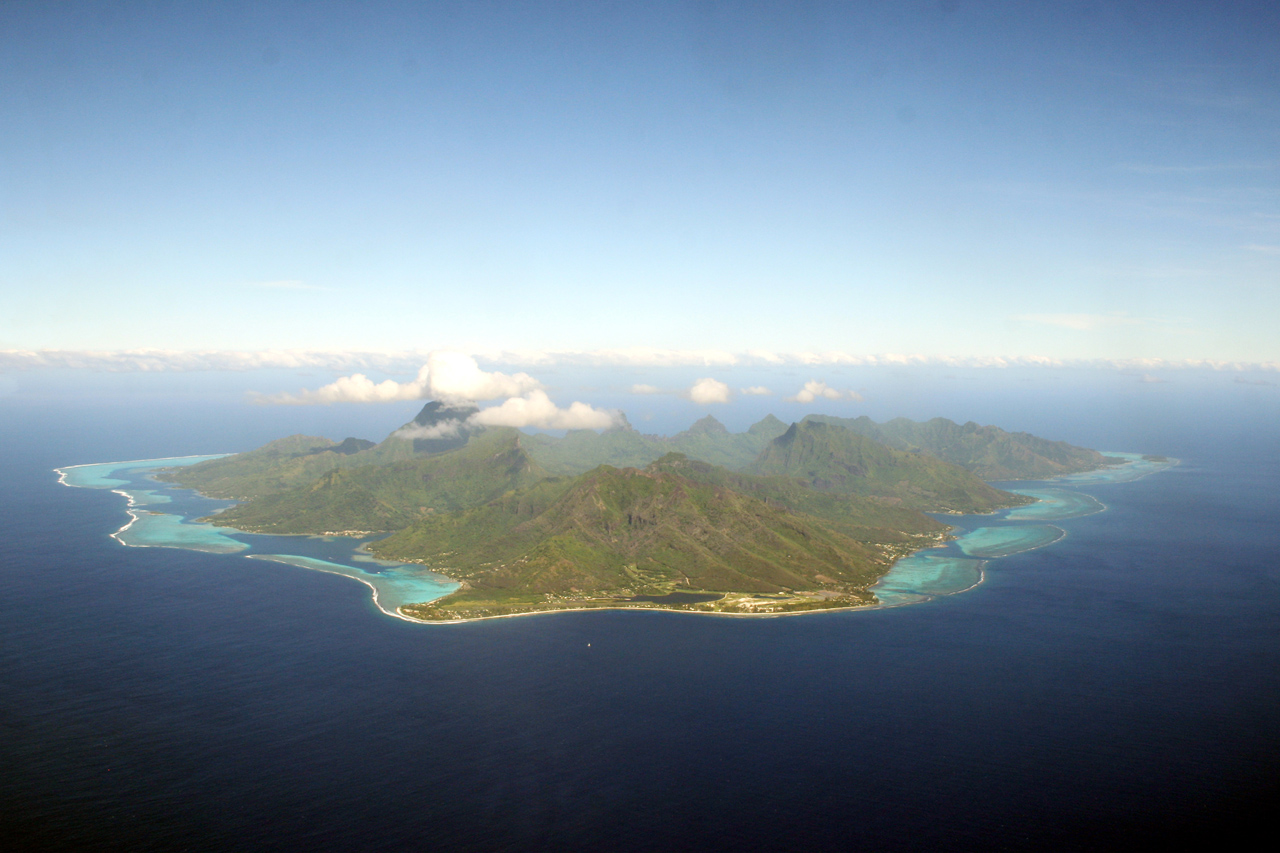
View on approach to Moorea Airport

- Health care in French Polynesia
- Transportation in French Polynesia
  - Airports in French Polynesia
  - Rail transport in French Polynesia
  - Roads in French Polynesia

== See also ==
- French Polynesia
- Index of French Polynesia-related articles
- List of international rankings
- Outline of France
- Outline of geography
- Outline of Oceania
