= List of companies of French Polynesia =

This is a list of notable companies based in French Polynesia.

== Largest firms ==
Name	2021 Revenues (XPF billion)	Employees	Founded	Notes
Électricité de Tahiti	22.4	535	1970	Electricity provider
ONATi	19.3	634	2013	Telecommunications provider
Brasserie de Tahiti	14.5	415	1914	Brewery and beverage production
Pacific petroleum and services	14.2	21		Fossil fuel importer and distributor
Air Tahiti Nui	12.4	606	1996	Flag carrier airline

== Notable companies ==
This list includes notable companies with primary headquarters located in the country. The industry and sector follow the Industry Classification Benchmark taxonomy. Organizations which have ceased operations are included and noted as defunct.

Notable companies Status: P=Private, S=State; A=Active, D=Defunct
Name	Industry	Sector	Headquarters	Founded	Notes	Status	
Air Moana	Consumer services	Airlines		2022	Domestic airline	P	A
Air Tahiti	Consumer services	Airlines		1987	Domestic airline	P	A
Air Tahiti Nui	Consumer services	Airlines	Papeete	1996	International Flag carrier airline	S	A
AXA Assurances	Financials	Full line insurance	Papeete			P	A
Banque de Polynesie	Financials	Banks	Papeete	1973		P	A
Banque de Tahiti	Financials	Banks	Papenoo	1969		P	A
Banque SOCREDO	Financials	Banks	Papeete	1959		S	A
Boyer Construction						P	A
Brasserie de Tahiti				1914	Brewing and beverages	P	A
CEDIS			Papeete			P	A
Électricité de Tahiti	Utilities	Conventional electricity		1970	Subsidiary of Engie	P	A
ONATi	Telecommunications	Telecommunications		2013	Subsidiary of OPT	S	A
OPT	Telecommunications	Telecommunications	Papeete	1984	Post and telecommunications	S	A
Pacific petroleum and services	Oil and Energy	Fuel, oil & diesel			Fuel importer	P	A
Petropol	Oil and Energy	Fuel, oil & diesel		1963	Distributor for Mobil	P	A
Polynesian Navigation Company				2014	Domestic shipping	P	A
Polynésie la 1ère	Consumer services	Broadcasting & entertainment	Faʻaʻā	1965	Public television channel	S	A
SDEC Hyper U	Consumer services		Pirae		Hypermarket	P	A
SEGC Carrefour	Consumer services	Food retailers & wholesalers			Carrefour Arue and Punaauia	P	A
SODIVA				1980	Car imports and services	P	A
SOPADEP				1927	Car importer and rentals	P	A
Tahiti Automobiles				1969	Car importer	P	A
Tahiti Nui Television	Consumer services	Broadcasting & entertainment	Papeete	2000		P	A
Totalenergies Marketing Polynesie	Oil and Energy	Fuel, oil & diesel			Petrol stations and solar farms	P	A
Wane Group	Consumer services	Food retailers & wholesalers				P	A
