= Pacific coast =

Part of a nation's coast bordering the Pacific Ocean

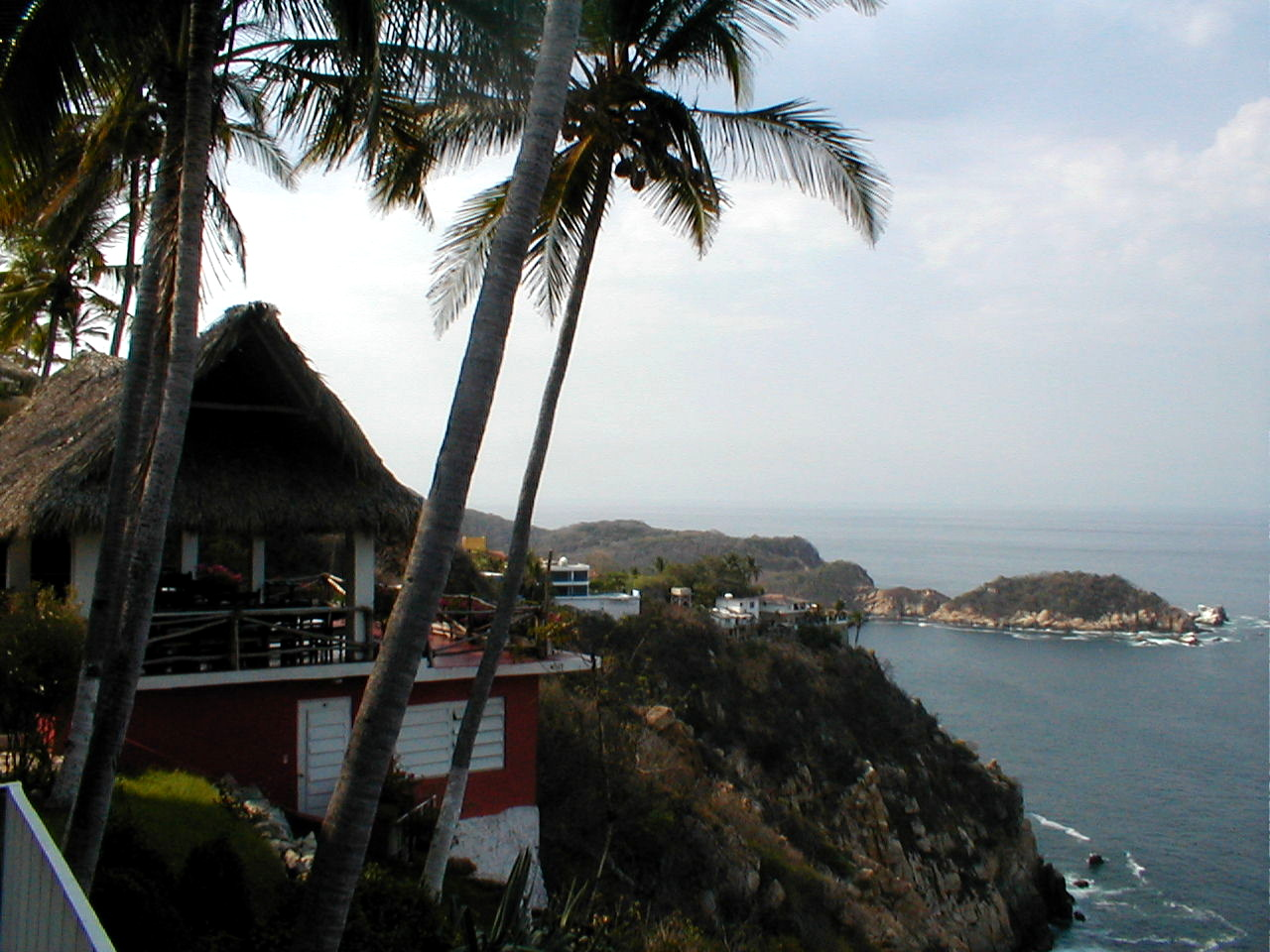
Coast of the Pacific Ocean in Acapulco

Pacific coast may be used to reference any coastline that borders the Pacific Ocean.

== Geography ==
=== Americas ===
==== North America ====
Countries on the western side of North America have a Pacific coast as their western or south-western border. One of the notable exceptions is Panama, where the Pacific coast is primarily on its southern border. The first Europeans to see the Pacific Ocean were able to do so by crossing the narrow Isthmus of Panama. The unique position of Panama in relation to the Pacific Ocean resulted in the ocean initially being named the South Sea.

- West Coast of Canada
- Geography of Costa Rica
- Geography of El Salvador
- Geography of Guatemala
- Geography of Honduras
- Pacific Coast of Mexico
- Geography of Nicaragua
- Geography of Panama
- West Coast of the United States
  - Geography of Alaska

==== South America ====
Only four countries in South America have a Pacific coast as a part (or all) of their border.

- Geography of Chile
- Geography of Colombia
- Geography of Ecuador
- Geography of Peru

=== Asia-Pacific ===
==== Asia ====
Countries and territories on the eastern, north-eastern, and south-eastern sides of Asia have a Pacific coast as a part (or all) of their border.

- Geography of Brunei
- Geography of Cambodia
- Geography of China
  - Geography of Hong Kong
  - Geography of Macau
- Geography of East Timor
- Geography of Indonesia
- Geography of Japan
- Geography of Malaysia
- Geography of North Korea
- Geography of the Philippines
- Pacific Coast of Russia
- Geography of Singapore
- Geography of South Korea
- Geography of Taiwan
- Geography of Thailand
- Geography of Vietnam

==== Oceania ====
Australia's Pacific coast is on its eastern border. Except the Ashmore and Cartier Islands and the Australian Indian Ocean Territories, all the other countries and territories in Oceania have their entire border surrounded by the Pacific Ocean.

- Geography of American Samoa
- Geography of Australia
  - Geography of the Coral Sea Islands
  - Geography of Norfolk Island
- Geography of Clipperton Island
- Geography of the Cook Islands
- Geography of Easter Island
- Geography of Fiji
- Geography of French Polynesia
- Geography of Guam
- Geography of Hawaii
- Geography of Kiribati
- Geography of the Marshall Islands
- Geography of the Federated States of Micronesia
- Geography of Nauru
- Geography of New Caledonia
- Geography of New Zealand
  - Geography of Tokelau
- Geography of Niue
- Geography of the Northern Mariana Islands
- Geography of Palau
- Geography of Papua New Guinea
  - Geography of Bougainville
- Geography of the Pitcairn Islands
- Geography of Samoa
- Geography of Solomon Islands
- Geography of Tonga
- Geography of Tuvalu
- Geography of the U.S. Minor Outlying Islands
  - Geography of Baker Island
  - Geography of Howland Island
  - Geography of Jarvis Island
  - Geography of Johnston Atoll
  - Geography of Kingman Reef
  - Geography of Midway Atoll
  - Geography of Palmyra Atoll
  - Geography of Wake Island
- Geography of Vanuatu
- Geography of Wallis and Futuna

== See also ==
- Pacific Rim
- List of sovereign states and dependent territories in Oceania
- South Sea (disambiguation)
