= Électricité de Tahiti =

- Industry: Electricity
- Founded: 1970
- Area served: French Polynesia
- Key people: Didier Pouzou (CEO)
- Revenue: 22.4 billion XPF (2021)
- Number of employees: 535
- Parent: Engie

Électricité de Tahiti ( EDT ) is an electricity company which holds the public concession for the generation and distribution of electricity in French Polynesia. In 2022 it was ranked as the largest company in French Polynesia by turnover. It is 70% owned by the Engie group, with the Société Monégasque de l'Electricité et du Gaz, itself a subsidiary of Engie, holding a further 21%.

The company produces thermal and renewable electricity, operates the transmission network of the state-owned Société de transport d'énergie Electrique en Polynésie (TEP), distributes electricity and provides associated services such as public lighting.

== History ==
The first public electrical energy distribution company in French Polynesia was created in 1910 by Charles Ducorron. It was succeeded by the Etablissements Martin et fils, who held the concession for providing electricity in Tahiti. In 1970 the service was transformed into a public limited company Électricité de Tahiti, which became a subsidiary of the transnational Engie in 1987.

The delegation of public service for electricity dates from 1960, and has been modified by endorsements several times, between EDT and French Polynesia, which have in particular made it possible to extend its duration respectively for 20 and 10 years, bearing the date of expiry of the concession contract in 2020, then 2030.

In return, EDT was required to extend its services to other islands in French Polynesia, without a price increase.

EDT thus ensures the production and supply of electricity in Tahiti as well as in nineteen other islands and towns in French Polynesia.

== Generation ==
EDT mainly produces electrical energy from thermal power stations, the main one of which, fuel oil, is located in the Punaruu valley (industrial zone of Punaauia) as well as from hydroelectric power stations. The obligation to create, operate, develop and renew these power plants is included in the specifications of the EDT public service concession.

EDT has two subsidiaries for generating renewable electricity: Marama Nui for hydroelectricity, and Electra for photovoltaic solar energy.

Ownership of Marama Nui is split between EDT (56.36%) and the French Polynesian government (35.38%). It operates fifteen small dams located in six valleys of Tahiti, mainly in Papenoo, with a total capacity of 46MW. It generates on average 30% of total electricity production (just over 197 GWh).

Including photovoltaic solar energy injected by independent producers and by Electra, the production mix thus includes a significant share of renewable energies, around 30 to 35% per year. EDT's record is 70%, for the day of 23 January 2019. This performances make French Polynesia the third island territory of the South Pacific in terms of share of renewable energies in the electricity mix, as established by the comparison carried out by the Pacific Power Association in its report on the year 2015.

In December 2023 EDT opened its Putu Uira virtual generator, a battery system intended to smooth network usage.

== Distribution ==
In addition to distributing electricity on Tahiti, EDT has also become the concession holder for the majority of municipalities and intermunicipal associations in French Polynesia.

The distribution of electricity in Tahiti and in the affiliated islands of French Polynesia benefits from a tariff schedule established by the French Polynesian government, in compliance with a contractual formula allowing the remuneration of the EDT concessionaire. This includes tariff moderation efforts mainly aimed at small domestic households with low consumption, and at businesses ("medium voltage" subscribers). Pricing is also progressive for domestic customers: the high consumption brackets are more expensive, so as to encourage consumption control. There is also an incentive for night consumption for Medium Voltage users, who have smart meters to distinguish consumption times.

Electricity prices in French Polynesia are higher than in mainland France, due in particular to costs made higher by the remoteness and fragmentation of the electricity system, as well as by the absence of nuclear energy. Unlike the overseas departments and Wallis and Futuna, French Polynesia does not benefit from the contribution to the public service of electricity (CSPE), which allows an equalization with the tariffs of the metropolis. Electricity tariffs in French Polynesia, however, are lower than in most comparable electricity systems in the South Pacific.
