= Honotua =

Submarine communications cable system

Honotua is a submarine communications cable system that connects several islands of French Polynesia via Tahiti to Hawaii. The cable was laid by the cableship Île de Ré (câblier) between December 2009 and June 2010.

The international portion of cable contains a single fibre pair specified for 32x10 Gbit/s wavelength each, with initial lit capacity of 2x10 Gbit/s. The domestic system has 2 pairs of fibres specified for 8x10 Gbit/s each, with an initial lit capacity of 2x2.5 Gbit/s. It has cable landing points at:

- Vaitape, Bora Bora, French Polynesia
- Uturoa, Raiatea, French Polynesia
- Huahine, French Polynesia
- Moorea, French Polynesia
- Papenoo, Tahiti, French Polynesia
- Spencer Beach, Kawaihae, Hawaii, United States

The operator of this cable is the Office des postes et télécommunications de Polynésie française (OPT).

A monument commemorates the cable at its landing point in Tahiti. On it, an inscription reads:

"In memory of the people of Papenoo and of Hawai‘i, who established ties in the past: Tapuhe‘euanu‘u from Tapahi, who, fishing from his canoe, caught Hawai‘i the Great, Te‘ura-vahine from Ha‘apaiano‘o, the goddess Pere, who sought refuge in the volcano of Hawai‘i the Great, Mo‘iteha, King of Hawai‘i, who came back to Tahiti to build his marae Ra‘iteha at Mou‘a‘uranuiatea, Ra‘amaitahiti, his son, King of Tapahi, who brought his drum to Kaua‘i, To revive these ancient connections, Honotua was made: The submarine cable that links Tahiti to Hawai‘i. After quietly undulating in the deep sea, it has landed here, at Mamu (silence). Hopefully human ignorance will dissolve into silence and only knowledge will be conveyed."

The cable was later extended by the Manatua One Polynesia Fibre Cable to connect to the Cook Islands, Niue and Samoa.
