= Manatua One Polynesia Fibre Cable =

Submarine communications cable

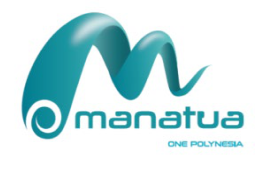
Manatua logo

The Manatua One Polynesia Fibre Cable is a 3,600 kilometres (2,200 mi) long submarine communications cable linking Samoa, Niue, the Cook Islands, and French Polynesia. The cable is the first-ever fibre optic cable connectivity available to the Cook Islands.

The cable is an extension of the Honotua cable linking Hawaii and Tahiti. It was declared "ready for service" in July 2020.

== History ==
The project was managed by the "Manatua Consortium", comprising OPT (Office des Postes et Télécommunications) of French Polynesia, Avaroa Cable Limited of the Cook Islands, Telecom Niue Limited of Niue, and Samoa Submarine Cable Company of Samoa.
