= Telecommunications in French Polynesia =

This article is about communications systems in French Polynesia.

The Honotua fiber optic cable connected Tahiti to Hawaii in 2010, increasing Internet speeds to 20 gigabits per second from 500 megabits per second. The cable will also connect to Moorea and the Leeward Islands of Huahine, Raiatea and Bora Bora.

== Telephone ==
Main lines in use: 32,000 (1995)

Mobile cellular: 4,000 (1995)

Telephone system:
Domestic: N/A
International: Satellite Earth station—1 Intelsat (Pacific Ocean)

== Radio ==
Radio stations: AM 2, FM 14, shortwave 2 (1998)

Radios: 128,000 (1997)

== Television ==
Television stations: 7 (plus 17 low-power repeaters) (1997)

Televisions: 40,000 (1997)

== Internet ==
Internet service providers (ISPs): OPT (national operator),

Country code (Top Level Domain): PF

ITU Prefix: F

Amateur radio prefix (Designated by France): FO
