= ONATi =

- Industry: Telecommunications
- Founded: 1995 (as Tikiphone); 2013 (as SAS Vini)
- Area served: French Polynesia
- Key people: Christophe Bergues, CEO
- Revenue: 19.3 billion XPF (2021)
- Number of employees: 634
- Parent: OPT
- Website: www.onati.pf

ONATi is a telecommunications provider in French Polynesia providing fixed-line telephone services, mobile phone services, and broadband. In 2022 it was ranked as the second largest company in French Polynesia by turnover. It is a subsidiary of the state-owned OPT.

The company was founded in 2013 from a merger of the OPT subsidiaries Tikiphone, TNS, and Mana. It was named after the Crimson-backed tanager, which had been used as branding for Tikiphone since 1995. The same month it announced the deployment of 4G technology in Papeete. Shortly after its formation, the OPT's monopoly on mobile phone services ended with the entry of Vodafone into the French Polynesian market.

In June 2018 the Polynesian Competition Authority found that Vini was engaging in unfair and anti-competitive practices, with discriminatory pricing for inter-network SMS messages, and exclusive contracts for prepaid cards. It gave the company three months to end the practices.

The company was reorganised in 2019 and renamed ONATi. In July 2021 chief executive Yannick Teriierooiterai was fired after poor financial results. In December 2022 his successor, Thomas Lefebvre-Segard, was dismissed for similar reasons. He was replaced by Christophe Bergues.

In April 2023 the Polynesian Competition Authority took precautionary measures against ONATi, ordering it to provide fair roaming charges to Viti.
