= List of birds of Easter Island =

This is a list of the bird species of Easter Island. The avifauna of Easter Island (Rapa Nui) include 51 species, of which 6 have been introduced by humans.

This list's taxonomic treatment (designation and sequence of orders, families and species) and nomenclature (common and scientific names) follow the conventions of The Clements Checklist of Birds of the World, 2022 edition. The family accounts at the beginning of each heading reflect this taxonomy, as do the species counts found in each family account. Introduced and accidental species are included in the total counts for Easter Island.

The following tags have been used to highlight several categories. Not all species fall into one of these categories. Those that do not are commonly occurring native species.

- (A) Accidental - a species that rarely or accidentally occurs on Easter Island
- Extinct - a species extinct to Easter Island
- (I) Introduced - a species introduced to Easter Island as a consequence, direct or indirect, of human actions
- (Ex) Extirpated - a species that no longer occurs in Easter Island although populations exist elsewhere

== Tinamous ==
Order: Tinamiformes Family: Tinamidae

Tinamous are a type of ground-dwelling bird that resemble landfowl. Despite the similarity, they are only distantly related. Tinamous are actually a ratite, a group of birds that includes ostriches, kiwis, and moas. While traditionally excluded from the group, this was later disproved by genetic evidence. Unlike other ratites, tinamous possess a keel and are still capable of flight. However, they only do this as a last resort, preferring to stay on the ground.

Common name	Binomial	Notes
Chilean tinamou	Nothoprocta perdicaria	(I)

== Pheasants, grouse, and allies ==
Order: Galliformes Family: Phasianidae

Phasianidae consists of the pheasants and their allies. These are terrestrial species, variable in size but generally plump with broad relatively short wings. Many species are gamebirds or have been domesticated as a food source for humans.

Common name	Binomial	Notes
Red junglefowl	Gallus gallus	(I)

== Pigeons and doves ==
Order: Columbiformes Family: Columbidae

Pigeons and doves are stout-bodied birds with short necks and short slender bills with a fleshy cere.

Common name	Binomial	Notes
Rock pigeon	Columba livia	(I)

== Rails, gallinules, and coots ==
Order: Gruiformes Family: Rallidae

Rallidae is a large family of small to medium-sized birds which includes the rails, crakes, coots, and gallinules. Typically they inhabit dense vegetation in damp environments near lakes, swamps or rivers. In general they are shy and secretive birds, making them difficult to observe. Most species have strong legs and long toes which are well adapted to soft uneven surfaces. They tend to have short, rounded wings and to be weak fliers.

Common name	Binomial	Notes
Easter Island crake	Porzana sp.	†Extinct
Easter Island rail	gen. et sp. indet.	†Extinct

== Plovers and lapwings ==
Order: Tinamiformes Family: Charadriidae

The family Charadriidae includes the plovers, dotterels, and lapwings. They are small to medium-sized birds with compact bodies, short, thick necks and long, usually pointed, wings. They are found in open country worldwide, mostly in habitats near water.

Common name	Binomial	Notes
Pacific golden-plover	Pluvialis fulva	(A)

== Sandpipers and allies ==
Order: Charadriiformes Family: Scolopacidae

Scolopacidae is a large diverse family of small to medium-sized shorebirds including the sandpipers, curlews, godwits, shanks, tattlers, woodcocks, snipes, dowitchers, and phalaropes. The majority of these species eat small invertebrates picked out of the mud or soil. Variation in length of legs and bills enables multiple species to feed in the same habitat, particularly on the coast, without direct competition for food.

Common name	Binomial	Notes
Bristle-thighed curlew	Numenius tahitiensis	(A)
Whimbrel	Numenius phaeopus	(A)
Sharp-tailed sandpiper	Calidris acuminata	(A)
Sanderling	Caldris alba	(A)
Wandering tattler	Tringa incana	(A)

== Skuas and jaegers ==
Order: Charadriiformes Family: Stercorariidae

The family Stercorariidae are, in general, medium to large birds, typically with gray or brown plumage, often with white markings on the wings. They nest on the ground in temperate and arctic regions and are long-distance migrants.

Common name	Binomial	Notes
Pomarine jaeger	Stercorarius pomarinus	(A)

== Gulls, terns, and skimmers ==
Order: Charadriiformes Family: Laridae

Laridae is a family of medium to large seabirds and includes gulls, terns and skimmers. Gulls are typically gray or white, often with black markings on the head or wings. They have longish bills and webbed feet. Terns are a group of generally medium to large seabirds typically with grey or white plumage, often with black markings on the head. Most terns hunt fish by diving but some pick insects off the surface of fresh water. Terns are generally long-lived birds, with several species known to live in excess of 30 years.

Common name	Binomial	Notes
Franklin's gull	Leucophaeus pipixcan	(A)
Brown noddy	Anous stolidus	
Gray noddy	Anous albivitta	
White tern	Gygis alba	
Sooty tern	Onychoprion fuscatus	
Gray-backed tern	Onychoprion lunatus	
Inca tern	Larosterna inca	(A)

== Tropicbirds ==
Order: Phaethontiformes Family: Phaethontidae

Tropicbirds are slender white birds of tropical oceans, with exceptionally long central tail feathers. Their heads and long wings have black markings.

Common name	Binomial	Notes
White-tailed tropicbird	Phaethon lepturus	
Red-tailed tropicbird	Phaethon rubricauda	

== Albatrosses ==
Order: Procellariiformes Family: Diomedeidae

The albatrosses are among the largest of flying birds, and the great albatrosses from the genus Diomedea have the largest wingspans of any extant birds.

Common name	Binomial	Notes
Chatham albatross	Thalassarche eremita	
Black-browed albatross	Thalassarche melanophris	(A)

== Shearwaters and petrels ==
Order: Procellariiformes Family: Procellariidae

The procellariids are the main group of medium-sized "true petrels", characterized by united nostrils with medium septum and a long outer functional primary.

Common name	Binomial	Notes
Southern giant-petrel	Macronectes giganteus	(A)
Northern giant-petrel	Macronectes halli	(A)
Cape petrel	Daption capense	(A)
Kermadec petrel	Pterodroma neglecta	
Herald petrel	Pterodroma heraldica	
Murphy's petrel	Pterodroma ultima	(A)
Henderson petrel	Pterodroma atrata	
Black-winged petrel	Pterodroma nigripennis	(A)
Phoenix petrel	Pterodroma alba	(A)
Wedge-tailed shearwater	Ardenna pacifica	(A)
Christmas shearwater	Puffinus nativitatis	
Tropical shearwater	Puffinus bailloni	(A)

== Frigatebirds ==
Order: Suliformes Family: Fregatidae

Frigatebirds are large seabirds usually found over tropical oceans. They are large, black-and-white, or completely black, with long wings and deeply forked tails. The males have colored inflatable throat pouches. They do not swim or walk and cannot take off from a flat surface. Having the largest wingspan-to-body-weight ratio of any bird, they are essentially aerial, able to stay aloft for more than a week.

Common name	Binomial	Notes
Great frigatebird	Fregata minor	

== Boobies and gannets ==
Order: Suliformes Family: Sulidae

The sulids comprise the gannets and boobies. Both groups are medium to large coastal seabirds that plunge-dive for fish.

Common name	Binomial	Notes
Masked booby	Sula dactylatra	
Peruvian booby	Sula variegata	(A)
Brown booby	Sula leucogaster	
Red-footed booby	Sula sula	(A)

== Herons, egrets, and bitterns ==
Order: Pelecaniformes Family: Ardeidae

The family Ardeidae contains the bitterns, herons, and egrets. Herons and egrets are medium to large wading birds with long necks and legs. Bitterns tend to be shorter necked and more wary. Members of Ardeidae fly with their necks retracted, unlike other long-necked birds such as storks, ibises, and spoonbills.

Common name	Binomial	Notes
Pacific reef-heron	Egretta sacra	(A)
Cattle egret	Bubulcus ibis	(A)

== Hawks, eagles, and kites ==
Order: Accipitriformes Family: Accipitridae

Accipitridae is a family of birds of prey, which includes hawks, eagles, kites, harriers, and Old World vultures. These birds have powerful hooked beaks for tearing flesh from their prey, strong legs, powerful talons, and keen eyesight.

Common name	Binomial	Notes
Cinereous harrier	Circus cinereus	(A)
Black-chested buzzard-eagle	Geranoaetus melanoleucus	

== Barn-owls ==
Order: Strigiformes Family: Strigidae

Barn-owls are medium to large owls with large heads and characteristic heart-shaped faces. They have long strong legs with powerful talons. One species has been recorded in Colombia.

Common name	Binomial	Notes
Barn owl	Tyto alba	(Ex)

== Falcons and caracaras ==
Order: Falconiformes Family: Falconidae

Falconidae is a family of diurnal birds of prey. They differ from hawks, eagles, and kites in that they kill with their beaks instead of their talons.

Common name	Binomial	Notes
Chimango caracara	Milvago chimango	(I)

== Wrens ==
Order: Passeriformes Family: Troglodytidae

The wrens are mainly small and inconspicuous except for their loud songs. These birds have short wings and thin down-turned bills. Several species often hold their tails upright. All are insectivorous.

Common name	Binomial	Notes
House wren	Troglodytes aedon	(A)

== Old World sparrows ==
Order: Passeriformes Family: Passeridae

Old World sparrows are small passerine birds. In general, sparrows tend to be small, plump, brown or gray birds with short tails and short powerful beaks. Sparrows are seed eaters, but they also consume small insects.

Common name	Binomial	Notes
House sparrow	Passer domesticus	(I)

== New World sparrows ==
Order: Passeriformes Family: Passerellidae

Most of the species are known as sparrows, but these birds are not closely related to the Old World sparrows which are in the family Passeridae. Many of these have distinctive head patterns.

Common name	Binomial	Notes
Rufous-collared sparrow	Zonotrichia capensis	(A)

== Troupials and allies ==
Order: Passeriformes Family: Icteridae

The icterids are a group of small to medium-sized, often colorful, passerine birds restricted to the New World and include the grackles, New World blackbirds, and New World orioles. Most species have black as the predominant plumage color, often enlivened by yellow, orange, or red.

Common name	Binomial	Notes
Long-tailed meadowlark	Leistes loyca	(Ex)
Austral blackbird	Curaeus curaeus	

== Tanagers and allies ==
Order: Passeriformes Family: Thraupidae

The tanagers are a large group of small to medium-sized passerine birds restricted to the New World, mainly in the tropics. Many species are brightly colored. As a family they are omnivorous, but individual species specialize in eating fruits, seeds, insects, or other types of food. Most have short, rounded wings.

Common name	Binomial	Notes
Diuca finch	Diuca diuca	(I)

== See also ==
- List of birds of Chile
- List of birds
- Lists of birds by region
