= Islam in French Polynesia =

Islam in French Polynesia (Islam en Polynésie Française, الإسلام في بولينزيا الفرنسية) – is a minority religion. In French Polynesia, an overseas territory of France, the 2020 Pew centrer research estimates the number of Muslims to less than 0.1% of the population i.e. less than 1,000 individuals. This indicates no change compared to the same research in 2010 and to an estimate of 500 Muslims in 2014, which constituted 0.1% of the nation’s population. These are estimates because there is no official census by religious affiliation in France (law Number 78-17). The Muslims in French Polynesia are Sunni, with most residing on the island of Tahiti.

== History ==
The Islamic faith began to establish itself in French Polynesia in the late 20th century – early 21st century, primarily with migrants from North Africa, predominantly from Algeria.

== Islamic organisation ==
The Tahiti Islamic Centre (French:Centre Islamique de Tahiti) is led by the 23-year-old Moroccan French Hicham el-Berkani.

== Mosque ==
In 2013, the first—and so far the only—mosque in French Polynesia was inaugurated in the capital city of Papeete, situated on Tahiti, the largest island of the Society Islands and French Polynesia. The establishment of the mosque was initiated by its imam, Hicham el-Berkani.

== Modern times ==
Although the government guarantees freedom of religion and the right to establish religious communities, in recent years there has been tension between the Christian and Muslim communities in French Polynesia. The opening of the prayer room (mosque) in Tahiti stirred up controversy. The mosque, which was meant to be the first in French Polynesia, was inaugurated on 15 October 2013 during the Eid al-Adha. Protesters, numbering in the hundreds and comprising French Polynesians practising Christianity, took to the streets of the capital, Papeete, leading to the mosque being compelled to close due to security concerns. Subsequently, the city authorities permitted the building to be used solely as an office.

The opposition party "A Tia Porinetia party" has declared its opposition to any form of religious extremism in the islands.

== Also See ==
- Religion in French Polynesia
- Islam in France
