= Polynesian Navigation Company =

French Polynesian shipping company

- Industry: Transport
- Founded: 2014
- Area served: French Polynesia
- Key people: Tutehau Martin
- Products: Sea transport

The Polynesian Navigation Company (Société de Navigation Polynesiènne) (SNP) is a shipping company in French Polynesia which operates routes between Tahiti and the Leeward Islands and Tuamotus. It is a subsidiary of the Martin Group.

In May 2014 SNP acquired the assets of the Société de transport insulaire maritime (STIM), including the ferries Hawaikinui and Nuku Hau, following the latter's receivership.

In 2017 SNP applied to the Polynesian Competition Authority for approval to purchase the Taporo fleet, which would have given it a monopoly on shipping to the Leeward Islands. Approval was granted, subject to a requirement that SNP sell two vessels to maintain competition. This condition led to the collapse of the deal.

In 2019 the company was granted a fuel tax refund to subsidise the Hawaikinui's service to the Leeward Islands.

In March 2022 it announced the construction of a new ferry, Hawaikinui 2, which is expected to replace Hawaikinui in 2025. In March 2023 its new ship, Hava'i, arrived in Papeete for use on the Leeward islands route. In April 2023 it applied to the Polynesian Competition Authority for approval to buy Transport maritime des Tuamotu Ouest, operators of the Mareva Nui. Approval was granted in June 2023. On 21 May 2024, the keel of the Hawaikinui 2 was laid and on 24 January 2025 the ship was successfully launched at shipyard Royal Bodewes B.V. in Foxfol after a christening ceremony. Departure from the shipyard is scheduled for April, when she will be towed by tugboats through the Winschoterdiep and Eems Canal to Delfzijl, after which she will go for sea trials on the river Eems. Planned handover after which it will depart under its own power to Tahiti. This voyage will take across the Atlantic Ocean, via the Panama Canal and through the South Pacific Ocean, with the islands of Bora Bora and Tahiti as its destination.

== Fleet ==
Name	Built	In service	Gross tonnage	Passengers	Notes
Hawaikinui 2	2025	2025 -	4,102 GT	12	
Hawaikinui	1980	2014 - 2025	879 GT		To be replaced 2025
Nuku Hau	1979	2014 -	1,161 GT		
Hava'i	2007	2023 -	2,638 GT		
Mareva Nui	1978	2023 -	400 GT		
