= Société Monégasque de l'Electricité et du Gaz =

Main electricity and gas supplier in Monaco

The Monaco Electricity and Gas Company (Société Monégasque de l'Electricité et du Gaz, SMEG) is a Monegasque concessionaire which distributes and supplies electricity and gas for the entire Principality of Monaco, which is over 25 000 customers and commercial entities. It operates public lighting and maintains the 7,200 light points in the area.

== History ==
In 1863 a company for sea bathing and gaming concessions was founded with a network of gas plants built until 1888. In 1890 a Monegasque electricity company (SME) was created with a concession signed for 50 years in Monaco. In 1936, Société Monégasque du Gaz (SMG) was created, which became a concessionaire for 30 years. In 1976, SME and SMG merged and SMEG was created.

In 1990, the SMEG took up residence in a new building, Avenue de Fontvieille, at the same time celebrating the centenary of the collaboration with the Principality.

== Renewable energies ==
Since 2012, SMEG has been providing “green” offers for the general public as well as for professionals and large accounts. In 2017 Monaco Énergies Renouvelables (MER) was created - a mixed company between the Monegasque Government and SMEG aimed at investing in renewable electricity production assets, such as photovoltaics. The objective of MER is to have 100% green electricity production capacities equivalent to the Monaco’s territory consumption.

SMEG has charging networks and car-sharing schemes throughout France and Monaco. The mobility entity of SMEG, Mobee uses Vulog technology to equip its car-sharing fleet of electric vehicles in Monaco.
