= Transport in French Polynesia =

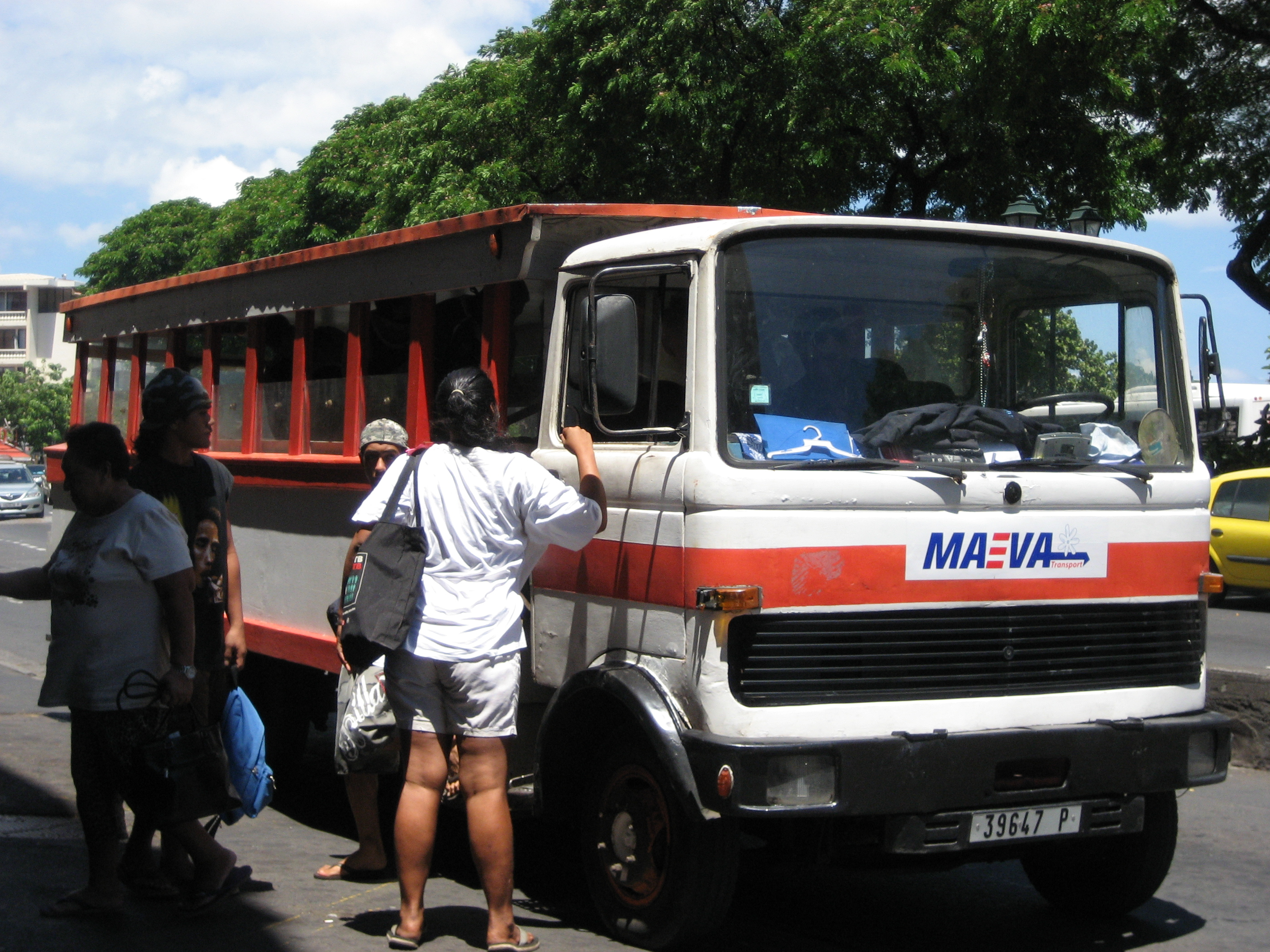
Le Truk bus service in Papeete, 2007.

Transport in French Polynesia is dominated by air travel, with a total of 37 airports with paved runways and another 13 airports without paved runways. Additionally, road transport is also a significant mode of transport within the islands that make up French Polynesia, with a total of 2590 kilometres of highways, 1735 km of which are paved.

== Aviation ==
The first airstrip, now Bora Bora Airport, was built in French Polynesia in 1942 by the U.S. military as part of World War II fortifications.

Due to the lack of major aviation infrastructure at Papeete, seaplanes were commonly used for domestic and international flights from the 1950s to 1960s, such as the famous Coral Route operated by Tasman Empire Airways Limited (TEAL) from 1951 using ex-RNZAF Catalina amphibious planes.

In 1960, the opening of Faa'a International Airport in Papeete finally allowed for large commercial jet plane flights to French Polynesia, with Transports Aériens Intercontinentaux (TAI) introducing jet-propelled services in 1962 using Douglas DC-8s.

Over the course of 20 years between 1960 and 1980 the French government undertook a large infrastructure program, building over 30 runways to replace seaplane ramps.

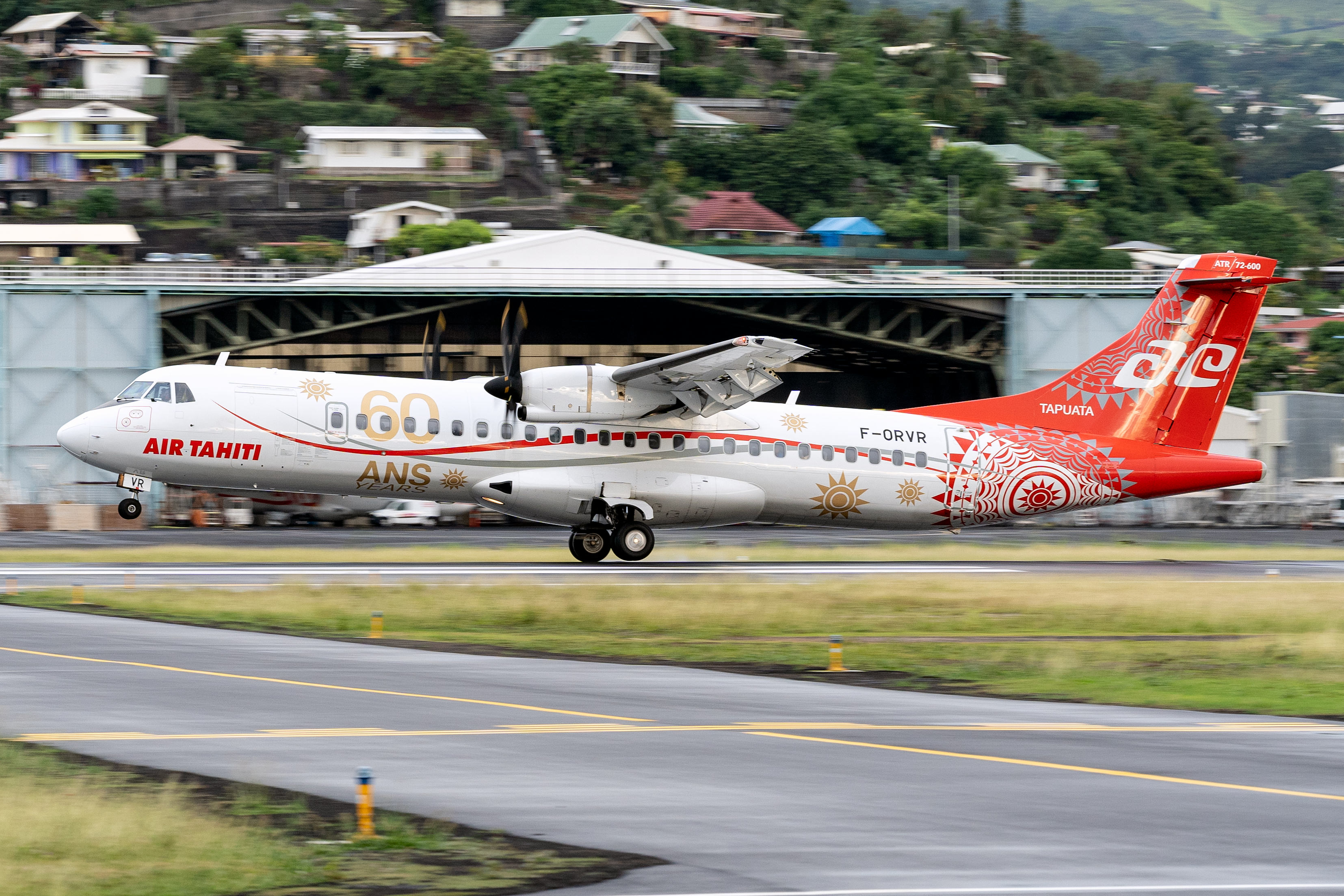
Air Tahiti ATR-72, showcasing 60th anniversary livery, landing at Faa'a International Airport in 2019.

As of 2003 there are a 49 airports and 1 heliport in French Polynesia, 37 have paved runways of which, 2, Faaʼa International Airport and Hao Airport, have runways over 3 km in length, 5 have runways between 1.5 km and 2.4 km long, with 23 airports having runways between 914 metres and 1.5 km in length, and the remaining 3 having runways under 914 m in length. The remaining 13 airports have unpaved runways with 5 having runways between 914 m and 1.5 km in length, and the other 8 having runways under 914 m long.

Air Tahiti, originally founded in 1950 as a seaplane concern, is the largest regional airline in French Polynesia, connecting 48 islands, and is the largest private employer in the Collectivity.

Air Tahiti Nui, established in 1996, is the international flag carrier for French Polynesia.

As a result of restrictions imposed by the United States due to the COVID-19 pandemic, Air Tahiti Nui Flight 64 became the longest domestic flight ever, traversing a distance of 15,715 kilometres (9,765 mi; 8,485 nmi) and taking 16 hours, 26 minutes from Paris to Papeete.

== Road transport ==
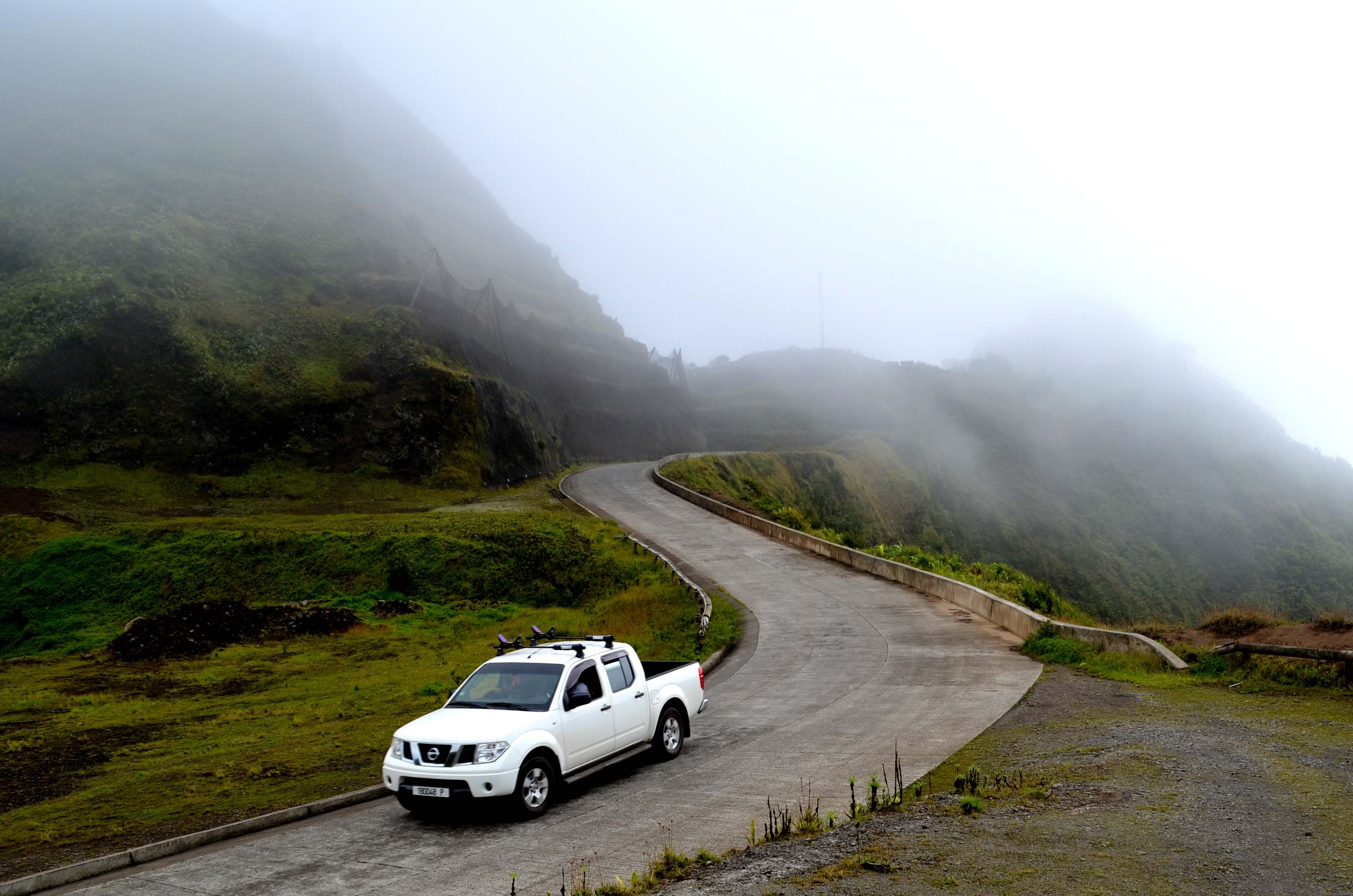
Road passing Tekao on Nuku Hiva in 2014.

When travelling internally within the islands of French Polynesia, road transport is the most common form of transit. As of 1999 there were a total of 2590 km of highways, of which 1735 km were paved and 855 km were unpaved.

One of the largest roadways in French Polynesia, a coastal two-lane road, is located on the largest island, Tahiti, running for a distance of approximately 114 km.

Some of the earliest colonial roadways in French Polynesia were constructed under the direction of missionary George Platt on Bora Bora at Beulah (now Vaitape) in 1824.

== Waterways ==
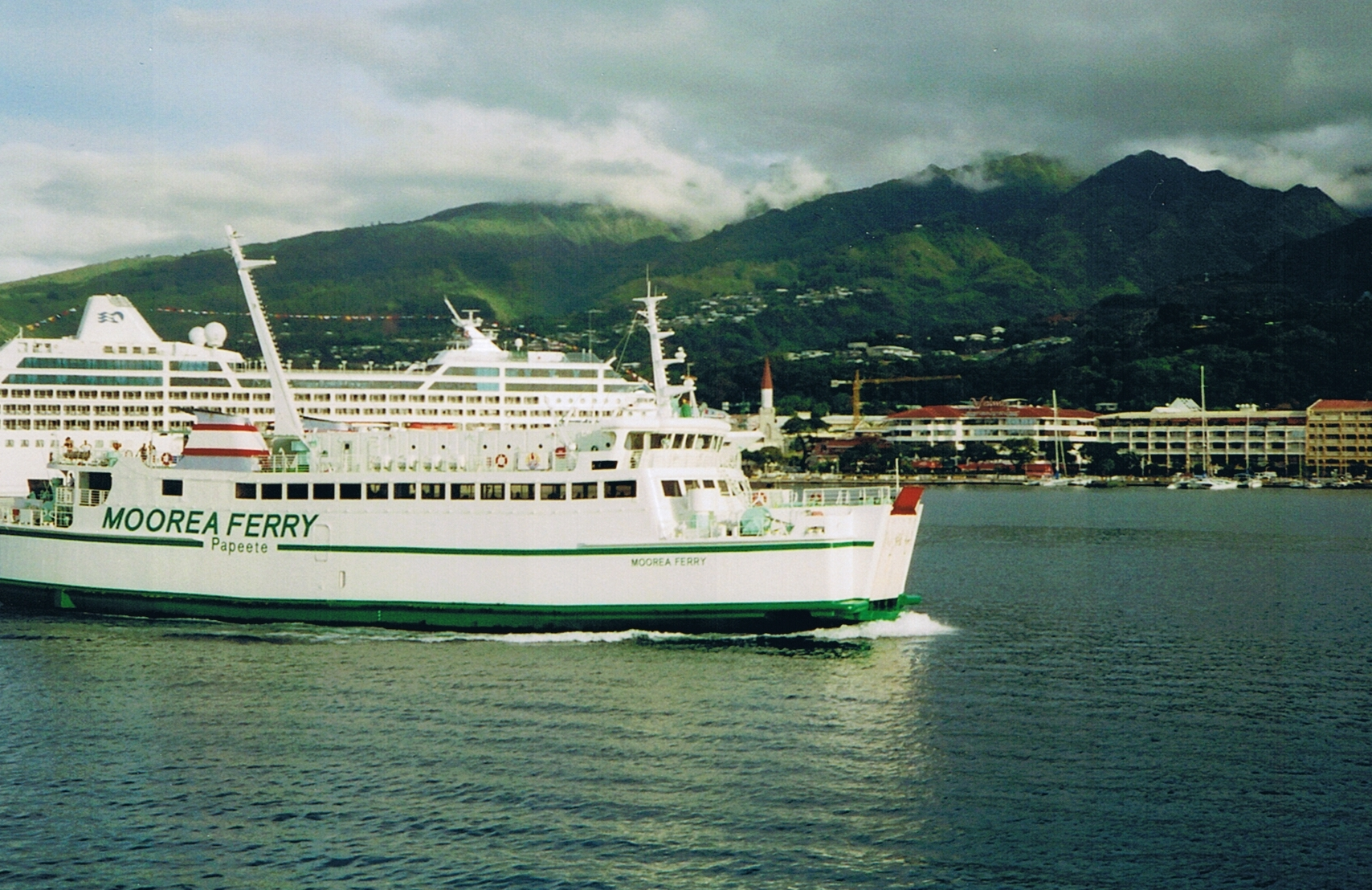
Moorea Ferry in Papeete harbour, 2002.

Major ports and harbours in French Polynesia include Mataura, Papeete, Rikitea, and Uturoa.

As of 2003 there were a total of 10 merchant marine vessels with a gross tonnage (GT) of 1,000 GT or over registered in French Polynesia, by type they were; 3 cargo ships, 2 passenger ships, 3 mixed passenger and cargo ships, 1 refrigerated cargo ship, and 1 roll-on/roll-off ship.

The Faaroa River on Raʻiātea island is one of the only navigable inland waterways in French Polynesia, and is generally used mainly for recreational purposes like canoeing.

== Railways ==
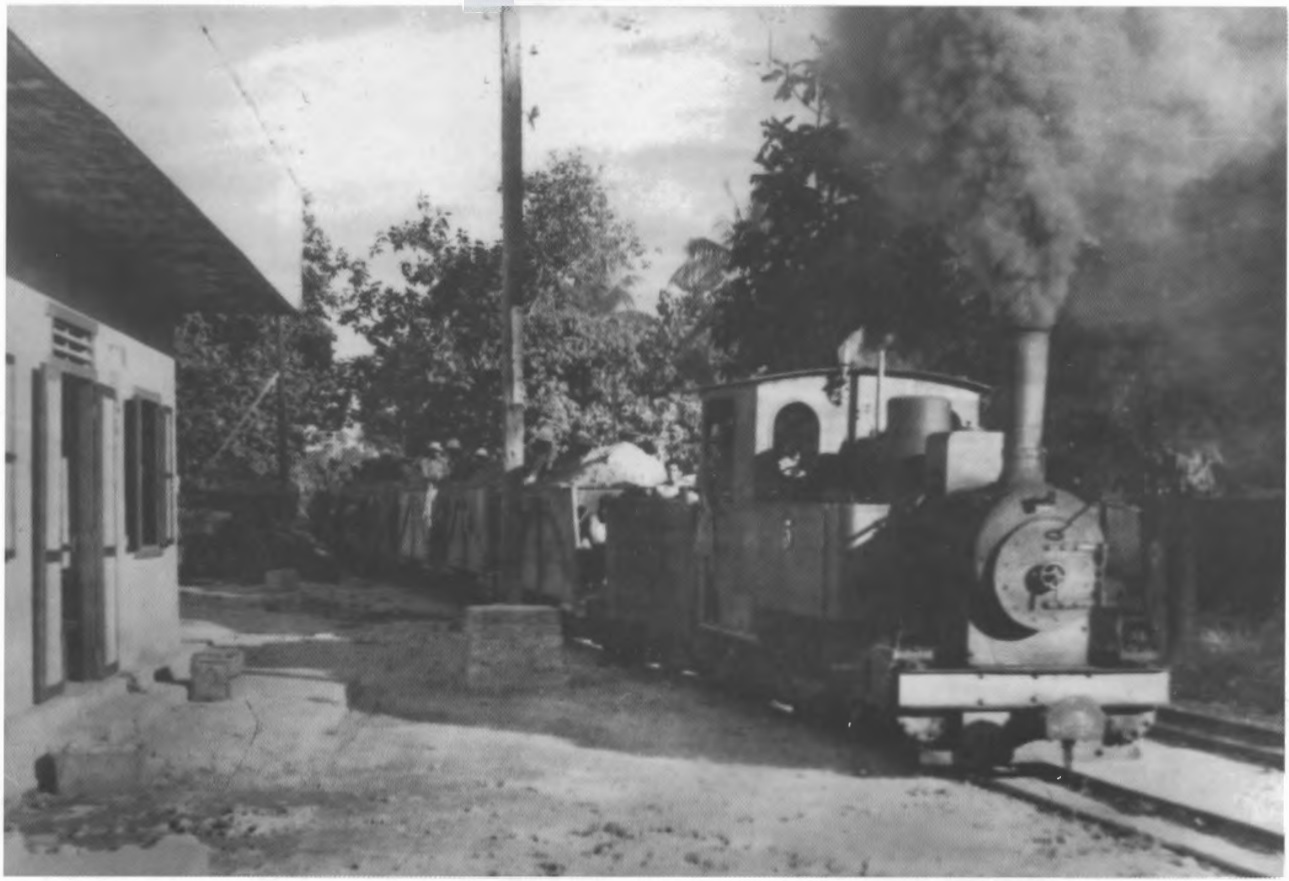
No. 5, O&K 0-8-0T+T hauling a train of phosphate through Vaitepaua in northern Makatea.

French Polynesia has no active railways. A proposal in 1885 for a 45 km long 600 mm narrow-gauge railway from Papeete to Papeuriri (now Mataiea) along the western coast of Tahiti was approved, but construction of the line never came to fruition.

In 1891 a small 600 mm narrow-gauge industrial network totalling 15 km and connecting several wharves between Papeete and Puna'auia began operating, the public were able to access the railway, with horses used to haul rolling stock, with a toll imposed by the local council for its use. Two temporary narrow-gauge lines were also built on Tahiti, one in 1886 for the construction of a water tower at Faaiere, and another in 1902 to move a post office in Papeete.

From 1920 a 600 mm narrow-gauge railway was used to transport mined guano from the centre of Makatea island to a rocky outcrop off the coast near Temao. The railway originally used steam locomotives, before switching to diesel power after World War II, the railway closing in 1966 with several remnants remaining in place, including four steam locomotives.

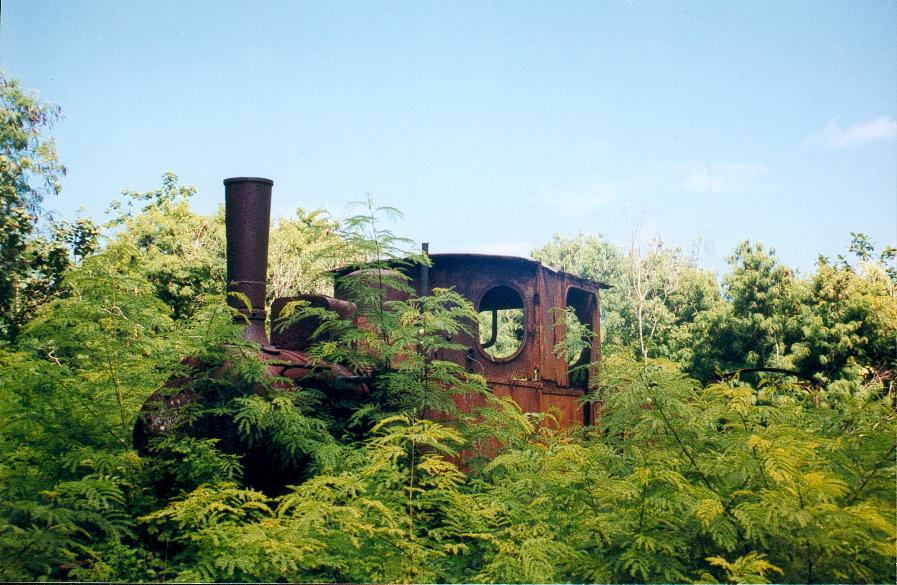
Abandoned O&K 0-8-0T+T on Makatea island in 2000.

== See also ==
- French Polynesia
- List of airports in French Polynesia
