= Brasserie de Tahiti =

- Industry: Beverages
- Founded: 1914
- Area served: French Polynesia
- Products: Hinano beer
- Revenue: 14.5 billion XPF
- Parent: Martin Group
- Website: www.brasseriedetahiti.com

Brasserie de Tahiti is a French Polynesian beverage company. Its products include Hinano beer, O'Tahiti bottled water, and it holds the local production and marketing licenses for Coca-Cola, Orangina and Schweppes. In addition, it controls a large number of subsidiaries in the food, distribution, and tourism industries. In 2022 it was ranked as the third-largest company in French Polynesia by turnover. It is a subsidiary of the Martin Group.

== History ==
The brewery was founded in 1914 and initially made a beer name "Aorai". After being destroyed in the Bombardment of Papeete in 1914, the brewery was rebuilt in 1917. After being bought by an American company in 1922, it was sold to Emil Martin in 1937. It was enlarged in 1953. In 1955 "Aorai" beer was renamed "Hinano". In 1959 the company obtained the local licence for Coca-Cola.

In 2019 the company acquired import and distribution company Morgan Vernex.

In April 2020, during the COVID-19 pandemic, the company shut down all production of beverages after the sale of alcohol was banned by the French Polynesian government. The ban was immediately reversed.

In March 2023 the company purchased the Hyper-U and Happy Market supermarkets.
