= OPT (French Polynesia) =

Office des postes et télécommunications de Polynésie française
- Industry: Telecommunications; Postal services
- Founded: 8 March 1985
- Headquarters: Papeʻete
- Area served: French Polynesia
- Key people: Jean-François Martin (President-Director General)
- Net income: F −937 million (2019)
- Total assets: F 83.864 billion (2019)
- Total equity: F 50.167 billion (2019)
- Number of employees: 1,341 (2019)
- Website: groupe.opt.pf

The Office des postes et télécommunications de Polynésie française (OPT, lit. 'Office of Posts and Telecommunications of French Polynesia' or 'French Polynesia Post and Telecommunications Office') is an établissement public à caractère industriel et commercial responsible for providing postal, telecommunications, and basic financial services in French Polynesia. Its head office is located at the Hôtel des Postes in Papeete.

Postal and telecommunications services were originally provided by the Office d’État des postes et télécommunications de la Polynésie française, created in 1962 after the arrival of the Pacific Experimentation Center. Following the granting of internal autonomy to French Polynesia in 1984, the Assembly of French Polynesia created an EPIC to provide those services instead.

As of 2023 the company has five major subsidiaries:

- ONATi for fixed and mobile telephony and broadband
- Fare Rata for postal services
- Tahiti Nui Telecom for satellite, cable, and cloud computing services
- Pacific Cash Services for cash transport within the OPT group
- MARARA Payment for financial services

The OPT is part of the International Telecommunication Union, the Universal Postal Union, the Pacific Islands Telecommunications Association (PITA), and the Pacific Telecommunications Council (PTC).
