= History of the Jews in French Polynesia =

Polynesian Jews Juifs polynésiens יהודים פולינזים
Total population
- 120 (2013)

Regions with significant populations
- Papeete

Languages
- French, Hebrew, Tahitian

Religion
- Judaism

The history of the Jews in French Polynesia can be traced back to the 19th century. The first Jew to settle in French Polynesia was Alexander Salmon, an English merchant; he married into the Tahitian royal family upon his marriage to Princess Arrioehau, a member of the Tevi tribe. Although Tahitian law at the time prohibited marriage to foreigners, Queen Pomare IV suspended the law for three days to allow the marriage. Their daughter, Queen Marau, was the last Queen of Tahiti.

More Jewish settlers arrived, but when Catholic priests later arrived, most of the Jewish population assimilated and converted to Catholicism. The majority of Jews in French Polynesia are of North African Sephardi heritage. The first organized Jewish community was established by Algerian-Jewish refugees in the 1960s. The Jewish community today is represented by the Association Culturelle des Israelites et Sympathisants de Polynesie (ACISPO), which was established in 1982. A synagogue and Jewish community center were established in 1993 in Papeete.

As of 2013, the Jewish population is around 120.

== See also ==
- Alexander Ariʻipaea Salmon
