= Queen Marau =

Queen of Tahiti from 1877 to 1880

Marau
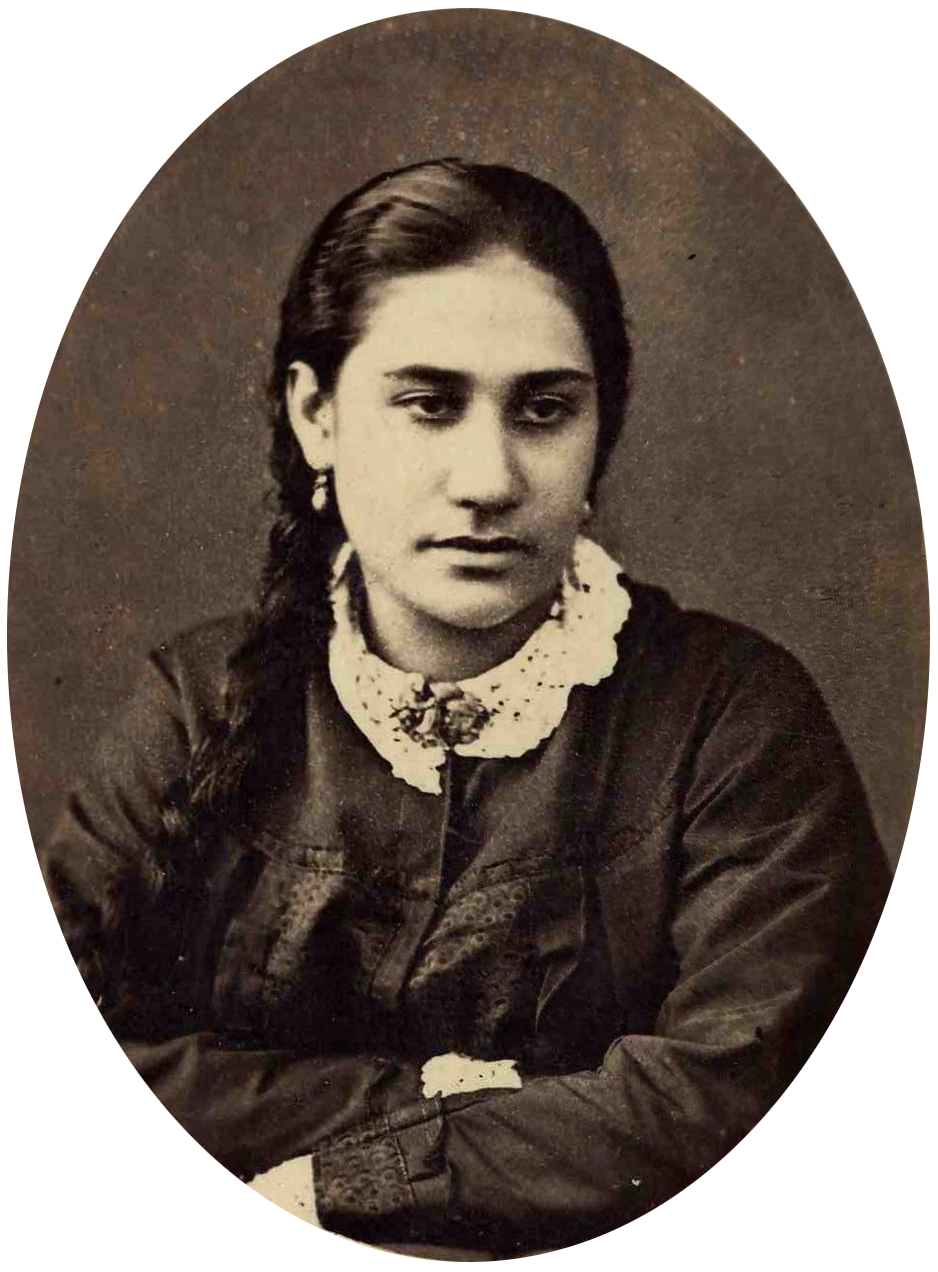

Queen consort of Tahiti
- Tenure: 17 September 1877 – 29 June 1880
- Coronation: 24 September 1877
- Born: Joanna Marau-Ta’aroa Tepa’u; 24 April 1860
- Died: 2 February 1935 (aged 74); Papeete, Tahiti
- Burial: Uranie Cemetery
- Spouse: Pōmare V
- Issue: Teriʻi nui o Tahiti; Takau Pōmare-Vedel; Ernest Albert Salmon
- Father: Alexander Salmon
- Mother: Ariʻi Taimaʻi

Johanna Marau Taʻaroa a Tepau Salmon (24 April 1860 – 2 February 1935) was the last Queen of Tahiti as the wife of King Pōmare V, who ruled from 1877 to 1880. Her name means "Much unique cleaning of the splash" in the Tahitian language.

== Life ==
=== Family ===
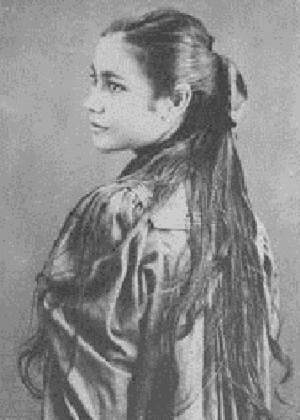
Marau at fifteen years old, around the time she married.

She was born in 1860 to Alexander Salmon (Solomon), an English Jewish merchant, and Princess Oehau, later given the title ariʻi Taimaʻi, their third daughter and seventh child. Her mother was the adoptive daughter of King Pōmare II's widow, the mother of Pōmare III and Pōmare IV. Considered one of the highest ranking chieftainesses in the land, she was head of the Teva clan, the traditional rivals of the Pōmare family, and descended from Chief Amo and Queen Purea who received the first European explorer to Tahiti Samuel Wallis in 1767. In 1846, Ariitamai was considered a rival candidate to the throne by the French governor Armand Joseph Bruat in the event that Queen Pōmare IV did not return from her self-imposed exile to Raiatea during the Franco-Tahitian War and comply with a French protectorate over Tahiti.

Her parents had ten children. Marau's siblings were: brothers Tepau, Tati, Ariʻipaea, and Narii; and sisters Titaua, Moetia, Beretania, and Manihinihi; see family tree. The Tahitians considered her family to be royalty. Following their mother's death, Marau's relationship with her siblings was shattered, culminating in a seven-year feud and legal battle over their mother's lands and possessions. However, she was able to reconcile with her siblings and drop the lawsuits in 1904. Marau and her sister Moetia outlived all their siblings and died only months apart.

=== Education ===
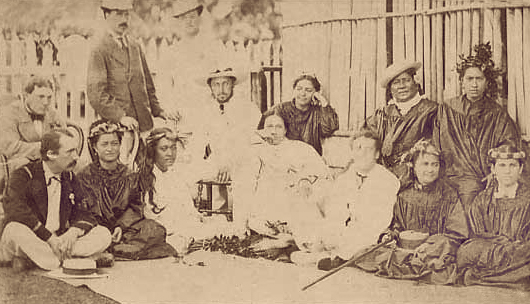
Alfred, Duke of Edinburgh in Tahiti with Titaua Brander resting on his knee

The Salmon children, and their relatives from the Brander family, attended schools in Europe or Australia. From the late 1860s, Marau was educated in Sydney, Australia. She attended a private school, Young Ladies’ College, operated by Miss Fallow in the city until she went home to Tahiti to marry. Her brother Narii and nephews John and Alexander Brander, who were the sons of her older sister Titaua, had preceded her to Sydney and commenced at Newington College in 1867. The boys had arrived by ship in Sydney on 29 October of that year with two native servants. Marau arrived in Sydney sometime after that as it is reported that she attended the picnic on 12 March 1868 at Clontarf where Alfred, Duke of Edinburgh, was wounded in the back by a revolver fired by Henry James O'Farrell. The Duke visited Tahiti in 1870 and met Marau's sister, Titaua Brander.

=== Marriage ===
On January 28, 1875, she married Crown Prince Ariiaue, the future King Pōmare V, at Papeete. She was only fourteen years old, and he was many years her senior and had been married and divorced before to Teuhe, who later became Queen of Huahine in her own right. The marriage was an unhappy arrangement and the couple constantly fought.

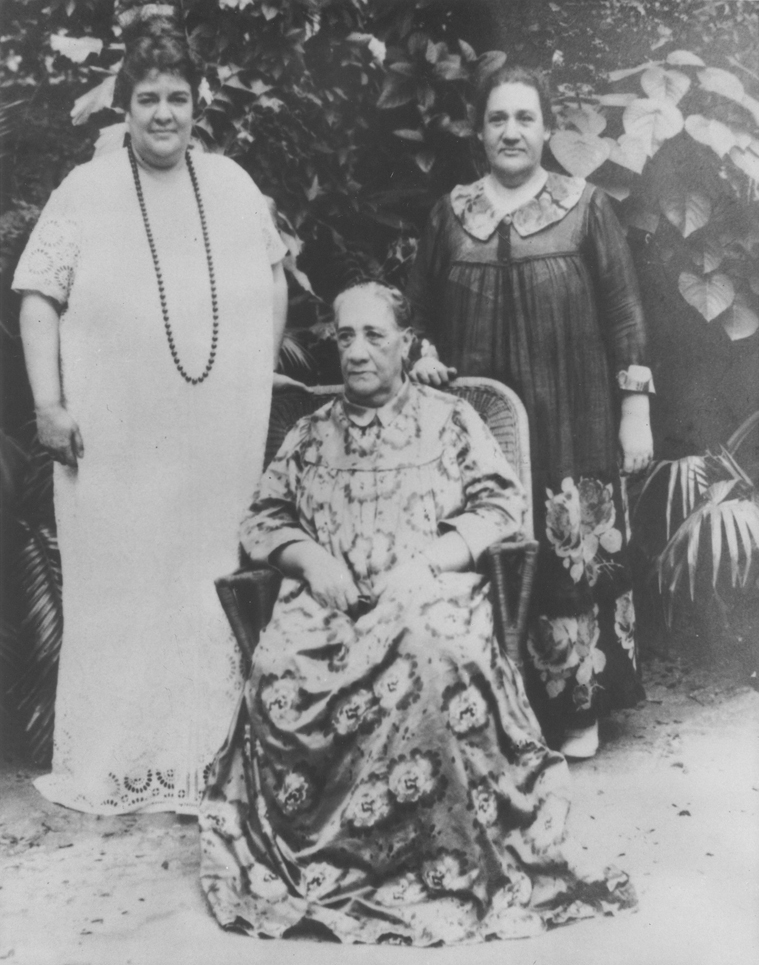
Queen Marau, her daughter Teri'i-nui-o-Tahiti and Hawaiian princess Abigail Kawānanakoa, 1929.

Her mother-in-law, Pōmare IV (1813–1877) died after a long reign on 17 September 1877, and Marau and Ariiaue separated, but the French Admiral Paul Serre persuaded them to make peace. They were crowned King and Queen of Tahiti on 24 September 1877 with the approval of the Legislative Assembly of Tahiti and the French, and her husband took the name of Pōmare V. They had three children:

1. Teri'i-nui-o-Tahiti Te-vahine-taora-te-rito-ma-te-ra'i Teri'ia'e-tua, better known as Princess Teri'inui o Tahiti (March 9, 1879 — October 29, 1961)
2. Ari'i-manihinihi Te-vahine-rere-atua-i-Fareia, better known as Princess Takau Pōmare-Vedel (January 4, 1887 — June 27, 1976)
3. Ernest Albert Teri'i-na-vaho-roa-i-te-tua-i-Hauviri Tetua-nui-marua-i-te-ra' i Aro-roa-i-te-mavana-o-Tu Te pau, (May 15, 1888 — December 4, 1961)

However, it was agreed that Pōmare V's niece Princess Teriivaetua (daughter of his second brother Tamatoa V of Raiatea); and his nephew Prince Hinoi (son of his fourth brother Prince Joinville) would be ahead of any children of Queen Marau in order to secure a pure-Tahitian heir to the throne, despite the fact that Prince Hinoi's mother was half-English.

Queen Marau traveled to Paris in 1884 where she was greatly received. Her fashion style was admired and copied by many Parisian society women. After Paris, it seems she toured other parts of France and possibly Europe before returning to Tahiti. On her voyage home, she fell in love with a French naval officer by whom she possibly had her two younger children. The marriage ended in divorce on July 27, 1887; the king repudiated her two younger children, and in retaliation, the queen denied his paternity of all three.

In later life she became acquainted with American writer Henry Adams who wrote a biography of her mother and herself. Among her other friends were Paul Gauguin, Pierre Loti, Somerset Maugham, Rupert Brooke, Robert Keable, Alain Gerbault. and Robert Louis Stevenson.

She died on 2 February 1935 in Papeete Hospital following an operation.

== Honours ==
French Honours

- Officer of the Order of the Legion of Honour (1924).

== Ancestry ==
Ancestors of Queen Marau

4. John Solomon
2. Alexander Salmon
10. Solomon Polack
5. Catherine Polack
11. Sarah
1. Marau Salmon
6. Tupua-Ta’aroa, of Teraimarou
3. Princess Oehau

== Family tree ==
Salmon-Ariʻitaimai family tree (partial)

			Alexander; Salmon (1820–1866)	Ariʻitaimai (1821–1897)
Titaua; Salmon (1842–1898)	Tepau; Salmon (1843–1844)	Moetia; Salmon (1848–1935)	Tati; Salmon (1850–1918)	Ariʻipaea; Salmon (1855–1918)	Nariʻi; Salmon (1856–1906)	Marau; Salmon (1860–1934)	Beretania; Salmon (1863–1894)	Manihinihi; Salmon (1866–1919)

Notes:
- Salmon, Ernest (1964). Alexandre Salmon, 1820–1866, et sa femme Ariitaimai, 1821–1897: deux figures de Tahiti à l'époque du protectorat. Paris: Société des Océanistes. doi:10.4000/books.sdo.777. ISBN 9782854300420. OCLC 6229240.

== See also ==
- Kingdom of Tahiti
- List of monarchs of Tahiti
- List of consorts of Tahiti

Preceded by Ariifaaite as Prince Consort	Queen consort of Tahiti; 17 September 1877 – 29 June 1880	Monarchy abolished
