= Donald H. McLennan =

Canadian doctor in Hawaii and Tonga (1850–1916)

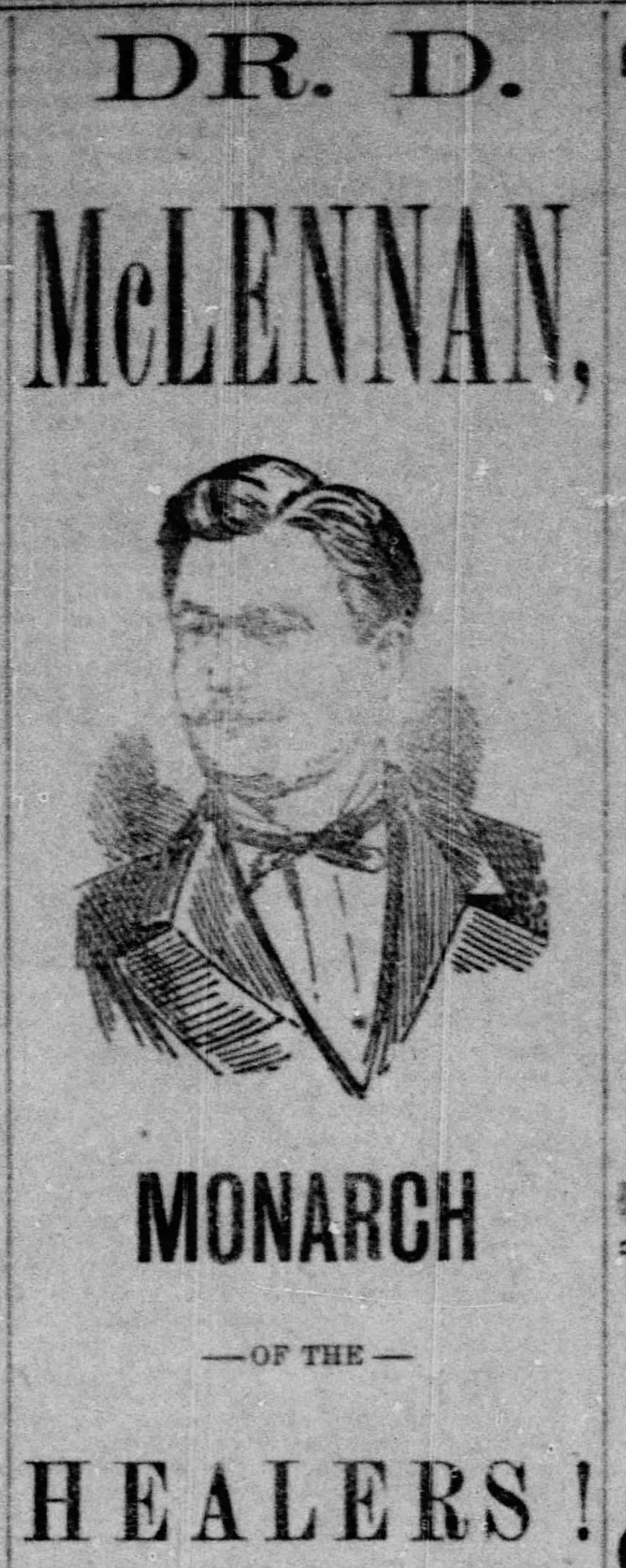
Illustration of Dr. McLennan in a Seattle Post advertisement

Donald H. McLennan (1850–1916) was a Canadian medical doctor, of Scottish heritage, who served as a court physician for the Hawaiian royal family and then the Chief Medical Officer of the government of Tonga. He was the personal doctor of Queen Lili'uokalani when the American Marines overthrew the Hawaiian monarchy in 1893.

== Birth and early life ==
McLennan was born Donald H. McLennan on September 10, 1850 in Cape Breton, Nova Scotia, Canada to Donald McLennan and Sybil MacKenzie. At the age of 18, he left for Boston, MA to attend school and work. He later moved to New York City, NY where he attended medical school and worked at Bellevue Hospital.

== Marriage and children ==
McLennan moved to California in 1875 and practiced medicine in San Francisco, Sacramento, and Stockton. He married Kate (Salmon) Armstrong, an actress, in 1878 in San Francisco. Armstrong was the niece of Alexander Salmon, a Tahitian merchant, who married into the royal family of Tahiti. Together the McLennans had one daughter, Eleanor (also called Nellie) McLennan, born in 1880. As an adult Eleanor McLennan became a writer under the name of Eleanor Rivenburgh.

== Medical career ==
With his medical practice centered in San Francisco and later Alameda island, the doctor would travel throughout the west coast of the United States to provide medical services. In 1890, McLennan moved to Honolulu, Hawaii, and became a court physician after the existing doctor suddenly died. His wife, Kate McLennan, may have helped him win the trust of the Hawaiian Royals as she was related to Tahitian Royalty herself. McLennan resided in Honolulu through the US Annexation of Hawaii in 1893 and Queen Lili'oukalani's abdication in 1896.

Robert Louis Stevenson visited Honolulu in 1893 and McLennan was part of the group of expatriate Scots that attended a lecture by Stevenson, sponsored by the Scottish Thistle Club. This event is described in an article in New York's The Bookman magazine, written by Eleanor Rivenburgh, in the final of a three part series, entitled "Stevenson in Hawaii". At the end of the meeting Robert Louis Stevenson asked to be presented to McLennan's wife, having earlier been told that she was related by marriage to the Tahitian royal family. Kate McLennan was personally greeted by Robert Louis Stevenson, and the next day Dr. and Mrs. McLennan had a further meeting. Dr. McLennan, wife Kate, and daughter Eleanor attended the wedding of Robert Louis Stevenson's stepson, Lloyd Osbourne in 1896 in Hawaii.

In 1897, McLennan took a position as the Chief Medical Officer of Tonga. He was the personal physician of King George II of Tonga and travelled with him to the United States in 1901 for an X-ray exam.
