= Ariifaaite =

Ariʻifaʻaite
- Prince consort of Tahiti
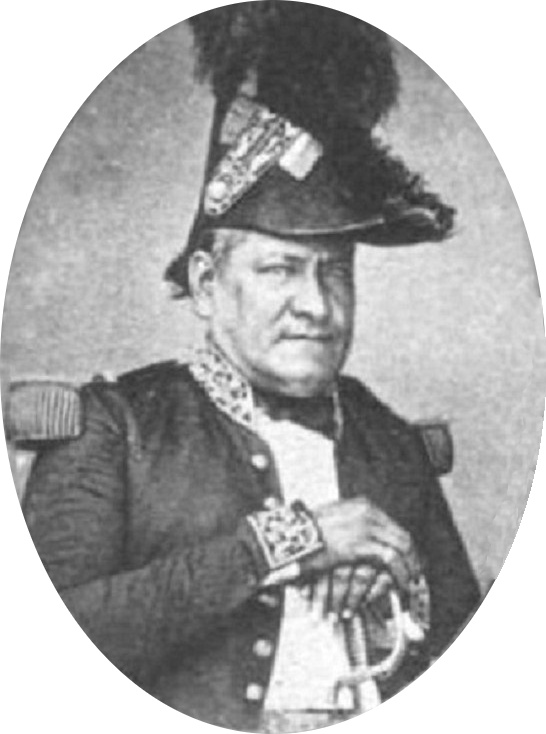
- The prince wearing a uniform presented by Queen Victoria in 1843.
- Born: 10 January 1820; Raiatea
- Died: 6 August 1873 (aged 53); Papeete, Tahiti
- Burial: Pōmare Royal Cemetery, Papaʻoa, ʻArue
- Spouse: Pōmare IV
- Issue among others...: Ariʻiaue; Pōmare V Teriʻimaevarua II; Tamatoa V Punuariʻi Teriʻitapunui; Teriʻitua Tuavira
Names
- Tenaniʻa Ariʻifaʻaite a Hiro
- House: House of Pōmare
- Father: Hiro
- Mother: Teihotu Taʻavea of Raiatea
- Religion: Reformed

Tenaniʻa Ariʻifaʻaite a Hiro (10 January 1820 – 6 August 1873) was a Prince consort of Tahiti. He was son of Hiro from Huahine and Teihotu alias Ta'avea daughter of Tamatoa III of Raiatea. He became second consort of his first cousin, Pōmare IV, Queen of Tahiti, who was likewise a maternal granddaughter of Tamatoa III. From their union were born:

1. A boy (1833, died young), died of dysentery
2. Henry Pōmare (August 1835, died young)., died of dysentery
3. Ariʻiaue Pōmare (12 August 1838 – 10 May 1856), Crown Prince of Tahiti, Ariʻi of Afaʻahiti.
4. Pōmare V (3 November 1839 – 12 June 1891), succeeded as King of Tahiti.
5. Teriʻimaevarua II (23 May 1841 – 12 February 1873), succeeded as Queen of Bora Bora.
6. Tamatoa V (23 September 1842 – 30 September 1881), succeeded as King of Raiatea.
7. Victoria Pōmare-vahine (1844 – June 1845).
8. Punuariʻi Teriʻitapunui Pōmare (20 March 1846 – 18 September 1888), Ariʻi of Mahina and President of the Tahitian High Court.
9. Teriʻitua Tuavira Pōmare (17 December 1847 – 9 April 1875), Ariʻirahi of Hitiaʻa, called the "Prince of Joinville".
10. Tevahitua Pōmare (1850/1852, died young).

== Bibliography ==
- Bennett, Frederick Debell (1840). Narrative of a Whaling Voyage Round the Globe from the Year 1833 to 1836: Comprising Sketches of Polynesia, California, the Indian Archipelago, Etc. With an Account of Southern Whales, the Sperm Whale Fishery, and the Natural History of the Climates Visited. London: R. Bentley. OCLC 1382866.
- Henry, Teuira; Orsmond, John Muggridge (1928). Ancient Tahiti. Vol. 48. Honolulu: Bernice Pauahi Bishop Museum. OCLC 3049679.
- London Missionary Society (1845). The Juvenile Missionary Magazine (and Annual). Vol. 2. London: London Missionary Society.
- London Missionary Society (1846). The Juvenile Missionary Magazine (and Annual). Vol. 3. London: London Missionary Society.
- Mortimer, Favell Lee (1838). The Night of Toil: or, A Familiar Account of the Labors of the First Missionaries in the South Sea Islands (1 ed.). Hatchard.
- Mortimer, Favell Lee (1869). The Night of Toil: or, A Familiar Account of the Labors of the First Missionaries in the South Sea Islands (6 ed.). Hatchard and Company.
- Melville, Herman (1847). Omoo, a Narrative of Adventures in the South Seas. London: John Murray.
- Pritchard, George (1983). The Aggressions of the French at Tahiti: And Other Islands in the Pacific. Oxford: Oxford University Press. ISBN 978-0-19-647994-1. OCLC 10470657.
- Pritchard, George (1878). Queen Pomare and Her Country. London: Elliot Stock. OCLC 663667911.
- Teissier, Raoul (1978). "Chefs et notables des Établissements Français de l'Océanie au temps du protectorat: 1842–1850". Bulletin de la Société des Études Océaniennes (202). Papeete: Société des Études Océaniennes. OCLC 9510786.

== Succession ==
Preceded by Tapoa II	Consorts of Tahiti; 5 December 1832 – 6 August 1873	Succeeded by Marau
