= Victoria Pōmare =

Victoria Pōmare-vahine
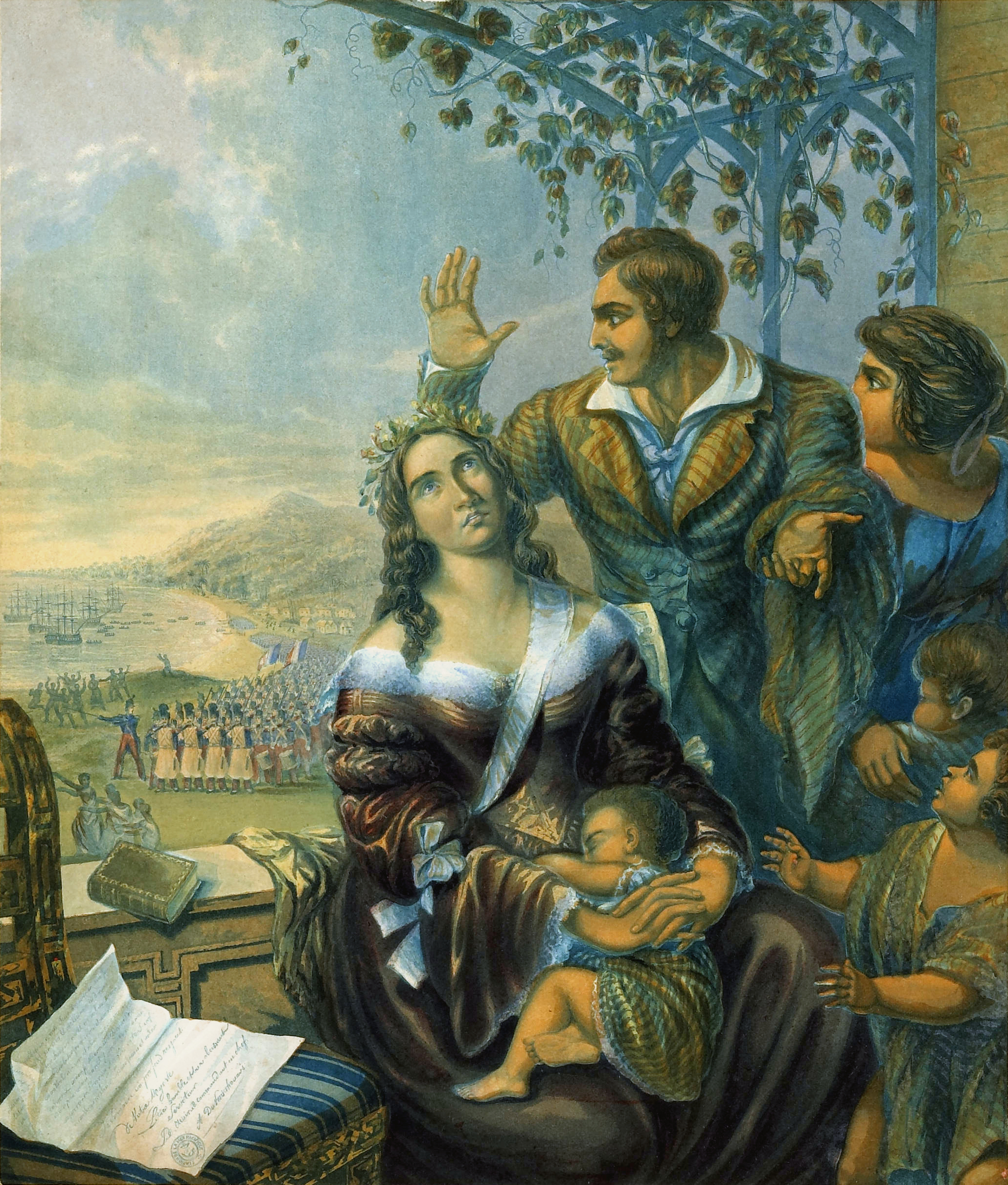
- Queen Pōmare and her family during the French invasion of Tahiti, 1845
- Born: c. 1844; Raiatea
- Died: June 1845; Raiatea
- Burial: Pōmare Royal Cemetery, Papaʻoa, ʻArue
- House: House of Pōmare
- Father: Ariʻifaʻaite a Hiro
- Mother: Pōmare IV

Victoria Pōmare-vahine (c. 1844 – June 1845) was a Tahitian princess and daughter of Queen Pōmare IV of Tahiti and her husband Ariʻifaʻaite a Hiro. A member of Pōmare Dynasty, she was born during the outbreak of the Franco-Tahitian War (1844–1847) when the Tahitian royal family were exiled to the neighboring island kingdom of Raiatea. She was named after the British Queen Victoria in hopes of a British intercession in the conflict.

== Biography ==
She was born in circa 1844 on the island of Raiatea while her mother was exiled there. She had three older brothers: Ariʻiaue, Teretane, Tamatoa and an older sister named Teriʻimaevarua. After the French invaded Tahiti in 1843, her family fled to Raiatea aboard the Carysfort to escape from the French colonial authorities and the violence of the Franco-Tahitian War. On Raiatea, her family resided in the Opoa Valley, on the southeast coast of the island, where the Taputapuatea marae once stood. The land had been provided for the family by Queen Pōmare's cousin the reigning Raiatean King Tamatoa IV. The new lifestyle of the royal family in Opoa were much more impoverished in comparison to life in Papeete, and the family had to reside in a small cottage which was described as "a place little better than a barn."

Her mother named her after Great Britain's Queen Victoria, whom Queen Pōmare had constantly written to in her time of crisis, asking for military protection and justice. The flag of Tahiti was also changed with the letters "Victoria ea Pomare" added, as a further gesture for the British to intervene on the Tahitians' behalf. Although Queen Victoria was sympathetic and touched by Queen Pōmare's letters, the Tahitian Queen's pleas fell on deaf ears due to the distance and Britain's reluctance to fight another war with France. The French crushed the Tahitian forces and ravaged the other three kingdoms in the archipelago. However, British sympathy was aroused enough to save Tahiti from total destruction and prevent the other Society Islands from falling to the same fate as Tahiti with the signing of the Jarnac Convention following the Franco-Tahitian War, which guaranteed the independence of the kingdoms of Bora Bora, Huahine and Raiatea.

Before the conflict ended, Princess Victoria died. The exact date of her death is uncertain. According to the English merchant Edward Lucett, the news of the infant's death arrived by June 21, 1845; however, a letter dated to November 24 of the same year, written to the Pritchard family of England from Pomare's children, included Victoria's name along with her siblings', which may indicate that she was still alive. Her early death struck her mother hard, and she was inconsolable for her loss. Queen Pōmare refused to eat or drink for three days and nights; the Tahitians recounted that "her grief [was] very sore." Edward Lucett, a British merchant and ship-owner present at the time, described the Queen's loss:

She seems to have clung the more to this child from its having been the child of her afflictions: born, as it was, in the midst of her troubles, when she sought refuge in the mountains from the French. Poor woman! her trials and difficulties have usually come upon her when the delicacy of her condition required more than ordinary kindness and attention, and in this instance her offspring has proved the sacrifice. Another thing that adds to the bitterness of her grief is, that she had christened the babe after our gracious queen, and was in hopes that Victoria would reciprocate the compliment, by calling some future daughter Pomare. With the loss of this infant, she feels her inward faith of support from Britain dying from her.

The Queen had once promised that when Victoria grew older she would place her child under the care of the Congregationalist missionaries of the London Missionary Society stationed on the island of Moorea. Her uncle King Pōmare III had also been raised and educated by the missionaries on Moorea, attending the South Sea Academy at Papetoai. However, the young princess' premature death prevented this plan.

== Ancestry ==
Ancestors of Victoria Pōmare

4. Ariʻipeu-a-Hiro
2. Ariʻifaʻaite
20. Tamatoa III (= 28)
10. Tamatoa IV (= 14)
21. Tu-rai-ariʻi (= 29)
5. Teihotu Taʻavea
22. Mato Teri’i Tepoara’i (= 30)
11. Tu-ra’i-ariʻi E-he-vahine (= 15)
23. Te-ha’apapa I (= 31)
1. Victoria Pōmare
24. Teu Tunuieaite Atua
12. Pōmare I
25. Tetupaia-i-Hauiri
6. Pōmare II
26. Teihotu-i-Ahura’i
13. Tetua-nui-reia-i-te-raʻi-atea
27. Vave’a Tetua-nui-rei-a-ite Ra’iatea
3. Pōmare IV
28. Tamatoa III (= 20)
14. Tamatoa IV (= 10)
29. Tu-rai-ariʻi (= 21)
7. Teri’to’-o-terai Tere-moe-moe
30. Mato Teri’i Tepoara’i (= 22)
15. Tu-ra’i-ariʻi E-he-vahine (= 11)
31. Te-ha’apapa I (= 23)

== Bibliography ==
- Craig, Robert D. (2002). Historical Dictionary of Polynesia. Vol. 39 (2 ed.). Lanham, Maryland: Scarecrow Press. ISBN 0-8108-4237-8.
- London Missionary Society (1845). The Juvenile Missionary Magazine (and Annual). Vol. 2. London: London Missionary Society.
- London Missionary Society (1846). The Juvenile Missionary Magazine (and Annual). Vol. 3. London: London Missionary Society.
- Lucett, Edward (1851). Rovings in the Pacific, from 1837 to 1849: with a glance at California. Vol. 2. London: Longman, Brown, Green, and Longmans.
- Mortimer, Favell Lee (1869). "The Sorrows of Queen Pomare". The Night of Toil: or, A Familiar Account of the Labors of the First Missionaries in the South Sea Islands (6 ed.). Hatchard and Company. pp. 412–434.
- Pritchard, George; Pomare (queen of Tahiti.) (1878). Queen Pomare and Her Country.
- Ward, Adolphus William; Gooch, George Peabody (1922). The Cambridge History of British Foreign Policy. Vol. 2. CUP Archive. pp. 182–185.
