= Vaekehu =

- Queen of Nuku Hiva
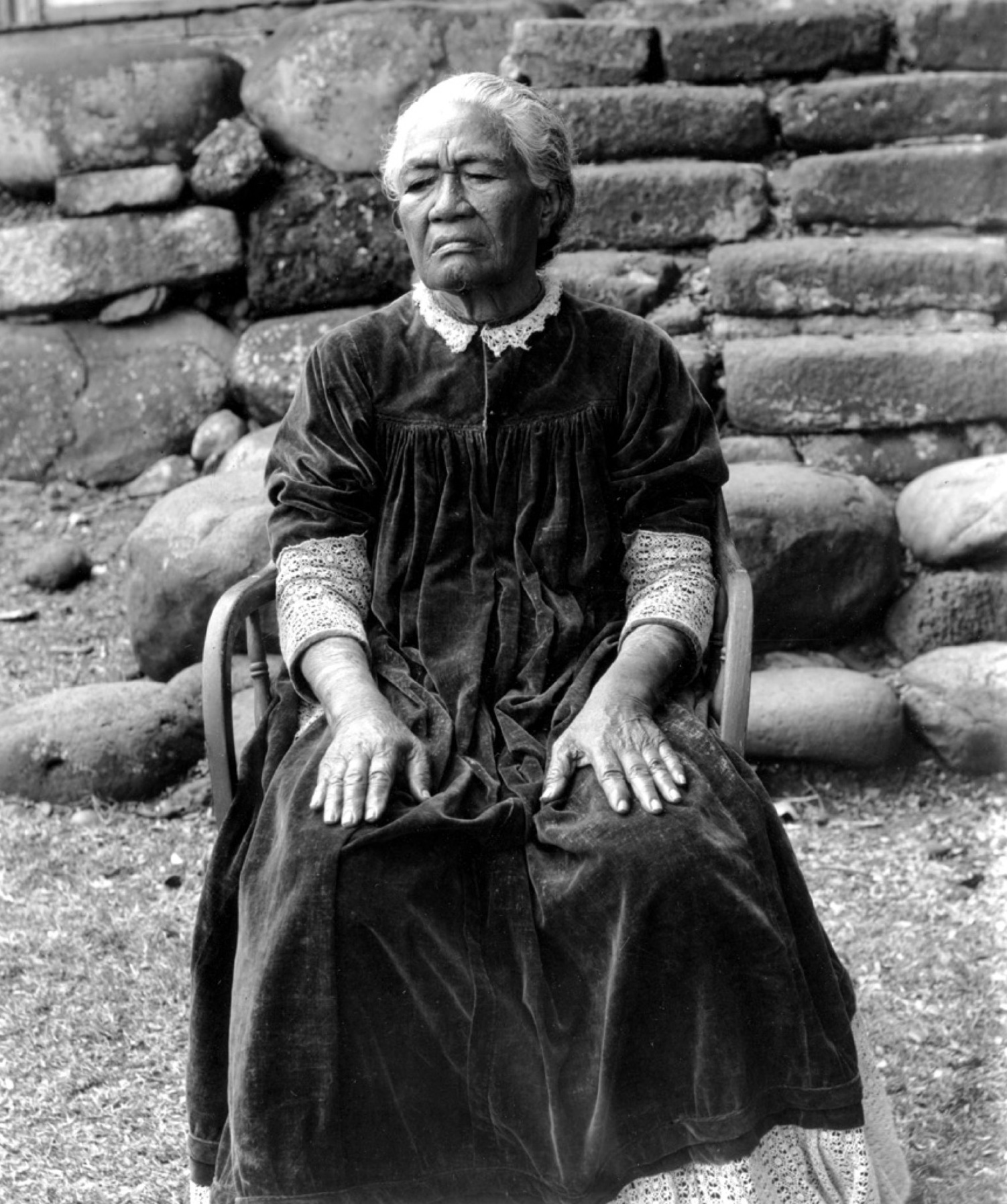
- Queen Vaekehu, photographed in 1899
- Born: Vaekehu; 1823; Nuka Hiva
- Died: 1901 (aged 77–78); Nuka Hiva
- King: Temoana
- Mother: Paetini
- Religion: Catholicism

Vaekehu (1823–1901) was the last Queen of Nuka Hiva, who reigned alongside King Temoana until his death in 1863. She converted to Catholicism in 1853, and spent time with her husband converting the rest of the Island. During her later life, she was visited by many European travellers, including Robert Louis Stevenson.

== Early life ==
Vaekehu was the youngest of two daughters of Paetini, who was a descendant of the prominent Chiefly house on Nuka Hiva. Paetini's husband was the High Chief of the Taioha'e on the islands, but she also had several secondary husbands. Vaekehu was married to a Hapa'a chief and had a daughter, who died in childhood as did her husband around the same time. Her elder sister married Temoana, and after her death, due to local custom, Vaekehu and Temoana were married. She adopted her niece and nephew, although both died before her. As with other local customs, Vaekehu was extensively tattooed, which was written about and drawn by many European visitors. Vaekehu described the pain she suffered while being tattooed, telling Albert Davin that she wished to be killed at the time to stop the pain.

== Marriage to Temoana ==
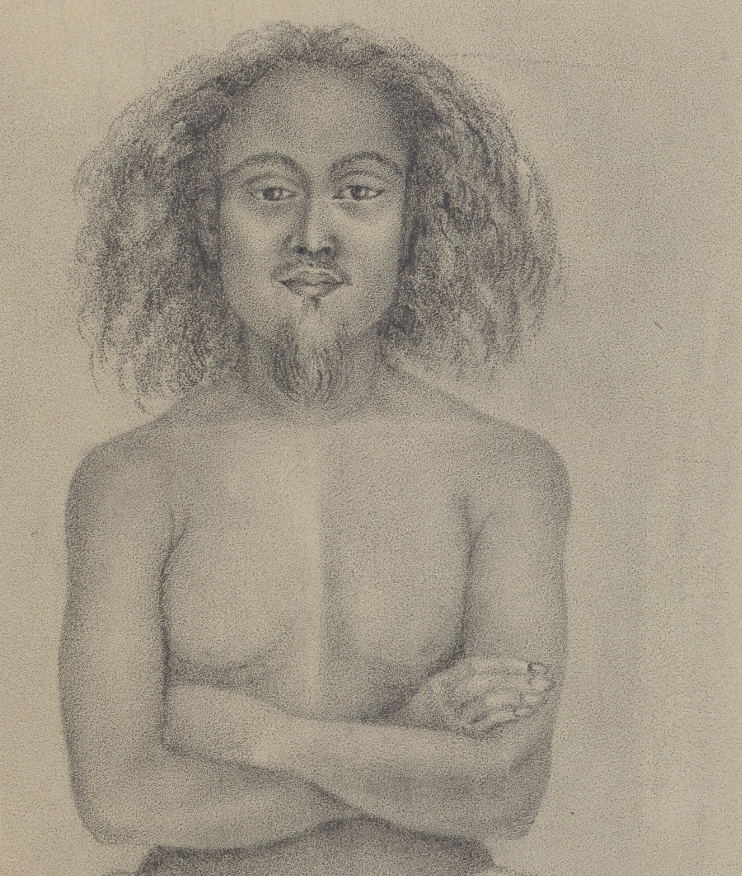
Temoana, king of Nuku-Hiva by Adele de Dombasle (1847-1848)

Temoana and Vaekehu were considered to be the King and Queen of Nuka Hiva by the French Empire. They received support from the French, despite Temoana's increasing erratic behaviour caused by excessive alcohol consumption. After an Italian named Motto managed to have the King arrested for plotting against the French, Vaekehu was among those who managed to have him released.

However, with the French planning an attack, Vaekehu created a French tricolour flag in order to show that they were loyal. Despite the flag being raised, the French were convinced by Motto to attack anyway. Temoana and Vaekehu were exiled to Tahiti on 8 October 1852, but were returned after only ten days by the Governor of the island. When they arrived back at Nuka Hiva, they stayed with the Catholic Bishop on the Island as their property had been destroyed. The Governor arrived the following January and reinstated Temoana and Veekehu as King and Queen, fired Motto and reprimanded the French commander.

Their entire family were baptised on 29 June 1853. They took westernised names, with Vaekehu adopting Elisabeth. The Bishop, Dordillion, was later adopted by Vaekehu as a grandson to provide him protection as a member of her family. They worked together to promote Catholicism on the Island extensively, with Temoana undertaking wars against neighbouring tribes to convert them. After the French ship Diamant left 12 dying crewmen in the hands of missionaries on the island, smallpox was introduced to Nuka Hiva. In the following seven months, 1500 islanders died. Around the same time, Temoana died of pleurisy on 12 September 1863. Vaekehu continued to reign on her own as Queen.

== Later life ==
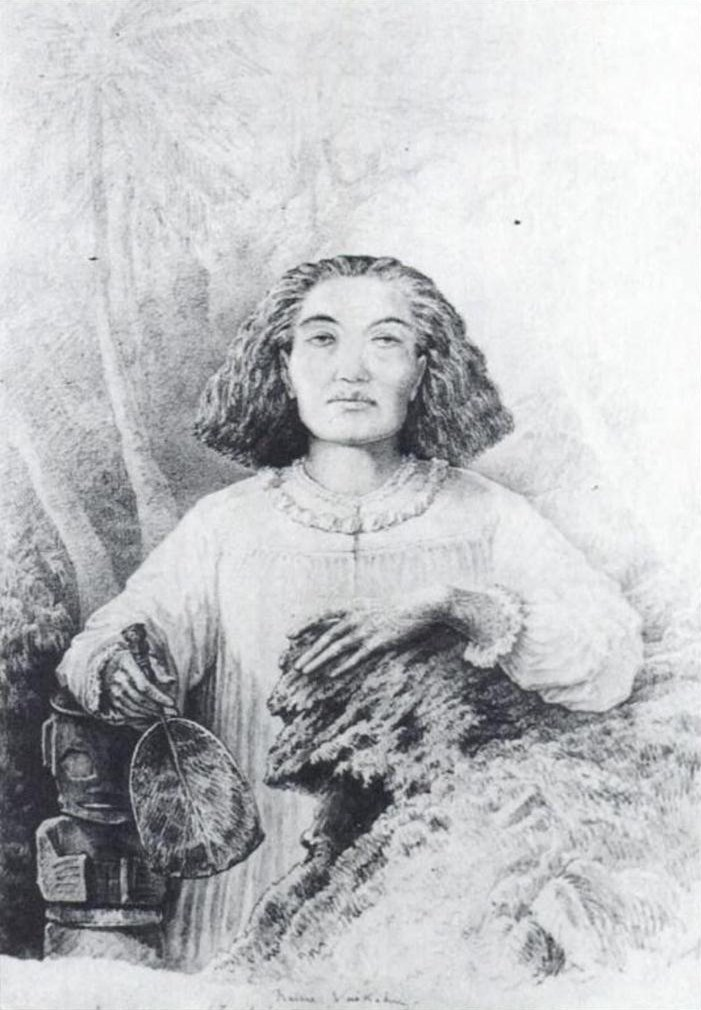
A drawing of Vaekehu by Pierre Loti, published in 1872

With the Nuka Hiva culture collapsing due to the ongoing deaths and the influence of the French, Vaekehu retreated to the mission compound and devoted herself to religion. She continued to receive European visitors, who spoke of her growing family with several adopted members. These included Robert Louis Stevenson, Pierre Loti and Karl von den Steinen. Although they spoke of her great dignity, they also said that she would enjoy telling stories, claiming to have eaten her first husband. She spent her time with Catholic nuns, and refused to engage with the traditions of the old religion of the island referring to them as pagan in nature.

Nine years after his death, she held a feast day for Temoana, which combined the Island traditions with a more sobre Catholic mass. She long thought that she was about to die, having received her last rights in 1872. She had already organised a coffin for herself by the time Stevenson visited her, and died in June 1901. She was placed in a mausoleum next to Temoana near the Catholic mission. She was known as the last Queen of the island.
