= Teriitua Tuavira Pōmare =

Teriʻitua Tuavira Pomare
- Prince of Tahiti
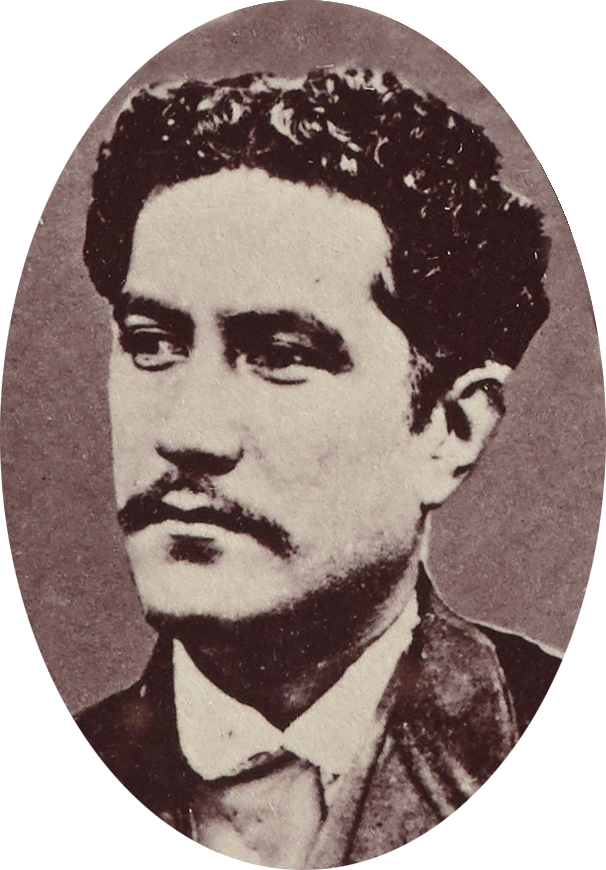

Chief of Hitiaa
- Reign: 1849–1875
- Predecessor: Teriʻitua Vahine
- Successor: Teri'ihinoiatua Pōmare
- Born: Teriʻitua Tuavira Pomare; December 17, 1847; Papeete Tahiti
- Died: April 9, 1875 (aged 27); Papeete (Tahiti)
- Spouse: Isabelle Vahinetua Shaw
- Issue: Teri'ihinoiatua Pomare
- House: Pōmare
- Father: Ariʻifaʻaite a Hiro
- Mother: Pōmare IV

Prince Teriʻitua Tuavira Joinville Pōmare (17 December 1847 – 9 April 1875), also known as Prince Joinville, was a member of the royal family of Tahiti, the Pōmare dynasty, who lived in the time of the French protectorate of the Kingdom of Tahiti (1842–1880).

== Biography ==
Tuavira Joinville was the youngest son of Pōmare IV, queen from 1827 to 1877, and of Ari'ifaite a Hiro, Prince consort, first cousin of the queen, and a chief from Huahine. At his birth, he was adopted by the childless Teri'itua, the female chief of the Hitia'a district, who had no children. When she died on 3 June 1849, the infant prince succeeded her and took her title. Because of his age, Teohu, the widower of Teri'itua, ruled as his representative. Matahiapo a Tanoa or Maraetaata later served as his representative in Hitiaa from 1872 to 1875.

At his christening, he was given the name "Joinville" by the French governor, Lavaud, in honor of Prince François, Prince of Joinville, one of the sons of French King Louis Philippe I. The Tahitians translated the given name of "Joinville" as "Tuavira." At a young age, he was able to speak a little of the French language. French governor Dubouzet took Tuavira on his 1856 visit to the French colony in New Caledonia to show him the tastes and habits of the Europeans.

At the age of 15, at his mother's request and with the agreement of the French governor La Richerie, he was sent with a group of six young Polynesian aristocrats to France to finish his education. The students departed Tahiti on 3 November 1862 and arrived in Brest on 25 February 1863 after four months of travel. They lived in France from 1863 to 1865 and acquired a good knowledge of the French language. Despite being Protestants, the Tahitian nobles wee educated by the Brothers of Ploërrnel at the École de Notre Dame de Toutes Aides in Nantes. He also was a student interpreter for indigenous affairs.

He died at Papeete on 9 April 1875.

=== Marriage and descendants ===
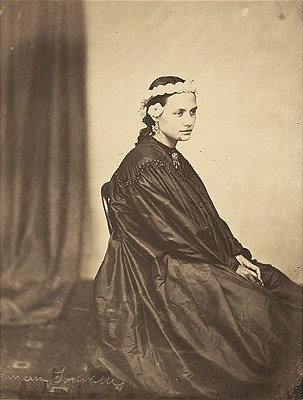
Princess Tuavira Joinville of Tahiti

In June 1868, he married Isabelle Vahinetua Shaw (1850–1918), the natural daughter of Captain William Shaw, an Englishman living in Papeete, and Teina a Tohi, a Tahitian from a chiefly family in Mo'orea. Considered an unequal marriage, the union was a great embarrassment for Queen Pōmare IV and the nobles but was accepted by the common people. Isabelle later became the mistress of his elder brother Pōmare V.

This marriage produced one son:

- Teri'ihinoiatua Pōmare, also known as Prince Hinoi (1869–1916), whose descendants still live in French Polynesia.

== Ancestry ==
Ancestors of Teriitua Tuavira Pōmare

4. Ariʻipeu-a-Hiro
2. Ariʻifaʻaite
10. Tamatoa IV (= 14)
5. Teihotu Taʻavea
11. Tu-ra’i-ariʻi E-he-vahine (= 15)
1. Teriʻitua Tuavira Pōmare
12. Pōmare I
6. Pōmare II
13. Tetua-nui-reia-i-te-raʻi-atea
3. Pōmare IV
14. Tamatoa IV (= 10)
7. Teri’to’-o-terai Tere-moe-moe
15. Tu-ra’i-ariʻi E-he-vahine (= 11)

== Bibliography ==
- Cuzent, Gilbert (1860). Îles de la société Tahiti: considérations géologiques, météorologiques et botaniques sur l'île. État moral actuel des Tahitiens, traits caractéristiques de leurs moeurs, végétaux susceptibles de donner des produits utiles au commerce et a l'industrie, et de procurer des frets de retour aux navires, cultures et productions horticoles, catalogue de la flore de Tahiti, dictionnaire Tahitien (in French). Rochefort: Impr. Thèze. OCLC 13494527. Archived from the original on 24 May 2020.
- Henry, Teuira; Orsmond, John Muggridge (1928). Ancient Tahiti. Vol. 48. Honolulu: Bernice Pauahi Bishop Museum. OCLC 3049679. Archived from the original on 7 July 2014.
- Newbury, Colin W. (1980). Tahiti Nui: Change and Survival in French Polynesia, 1767–1945 (PDF). Honolulu: University Press of Hawaii. hdl:10125/62908. ISBN 978-0-8248-8032-3. OCLC 1053883377. Archived (PDF) from the original on 10 November 2019.
- Oliver, Douglas L. (1974). Ancient Tahitian Society. Honolulu: University of Hawaii Press. doi:10.2307/j.ctvp2n5ds. hdl:1885/114907. ISBN 978-0-8248-8453-6. OCLC 1126284798. S2CID 165869849.
- O'Reilly, Patrick; Teissier, Raoul (1962). Tahitiens: répertoire bio-bibliographique de la Polynésie française (in French) (1st ed.). Paris: Musée de l'homme. pp. 82, 292, 356, 372, 452, Princesses Joinville, 297, 356, Prince Hinoi, 313, 376, 408, 451, Ariiaue, 453. OCLC 1001078211.
- O'Reilly, Patrick; Teissier, Raoul (1975). Tahitiens: répertoire biographique de la Polynésie française (in French) (2nd ed.). Paris: Musée de l'homme. pp. 554–555, 99. 358, Princesse Joinville, 365, 456, 555, Prince Hinoi, 80, 383, 435, 456, 458, 496, 554, Ariiaue, 556. OCLC 164090777. Archived from the original on 22 April 2016.
- Pritchard, George (1983). The Aggressions of the French at Tahiti: And Other Islands in the Pacific. Oxford: Oxford University Press. ISBN 978-0-19-647994-1. OCLC 10470657.
- Teissier, Raoul (1978). "Chefs et notables des Établissements Français de l'Océanie au temps du protectorat: 1842–1850". Bulletin de la Société des Études Océaniennes (in French) (202). Papeete: Société des Études Océaniennes. OCLC 9510786. Archived from the original on 25 April 2018.
