= Titaua Salmon =

Tahitian princess

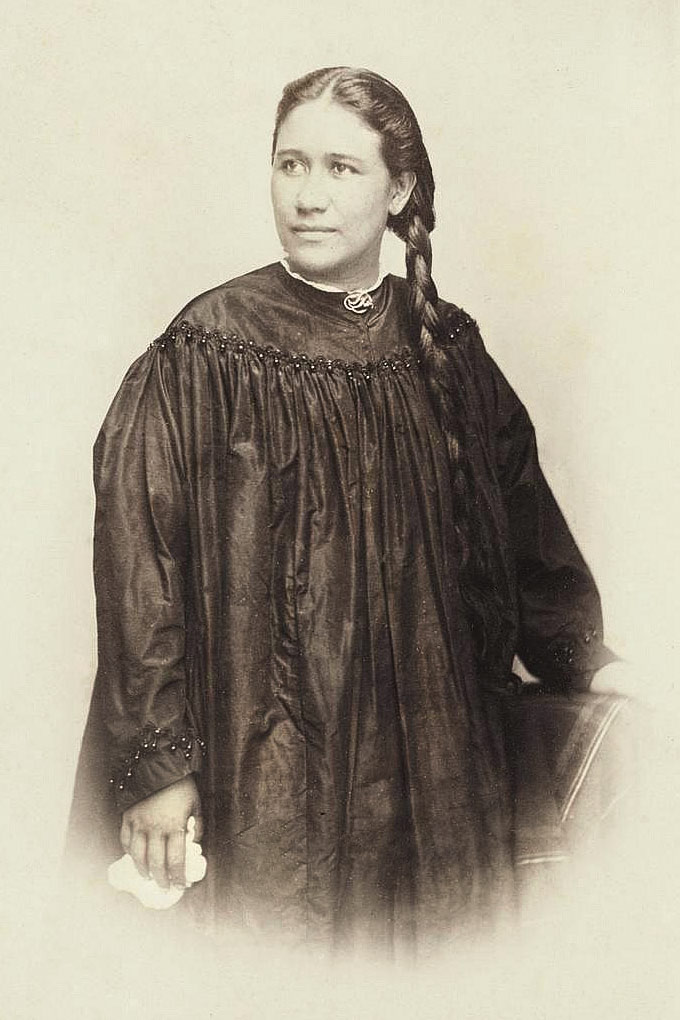
Titaua, photograph by Paul-Emile Miot, 1869-70

Princess Titaua Marama of Tahiti (1842–1898), also known as Tetuanui Reiaitera'iatea Titaua Salmon, was a Tahitian princess who traveled the 10,000 miles from Tahiti to Scotland in 1892.

== Early life ==
She was born November 3, 1842, in Papetoai, Moorea, in the Society Islands, the daughter of Alexander Salmon and Princess Arrioehau. Growing up as Chiefess of Haapiti, she met the author Robert Louis Stevenson and the painter Constance Gordon-Cumming when they visited the island.

At the age of 14, in July 1859, she married Scottish merchant John Brander. Together they had nine children. Following Brander's death in 1877, she married her second husband, George Darsie, in Tahiti in 1878. Together she and Darsie had six children, five of whom died.

== Scotland ==
In 1892 she moved with Darsie to Anstruther, Scotland.

She died on 25 September 1898 in Anstruther, after giving birth to her fifteenth child, who was known as Princess Paloma. She is buried alongside Darsie at the Anstruther Parish Church.

She is the subject of the book From the South Seas to the North Sea by British-American author Fiona J Mackintosh.
