= Alexander Ariʻipaea Salmon =

Tahitian businessman (1855–1914)

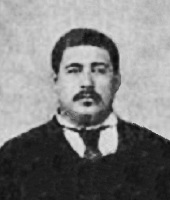
Alexander Salmon, Jr., c. 1885.

Alexander Ariʻipaea Vehiaitipare Salmon Jr. (1855–1914) was the English-Jewish-Tahitian co-owner of the Maison Brander plantations on Tahiti and de facto ruler of Easter Island from 1878 until its cession to Chile in 1888.

== Family ==
Salmon's father, Alexander Salmon (Solomon, 1822–1866), was an English Jewish merchant. While secretary to Pōmare IV of Tahiti, he fell in love with her twenty-year-old adoptive sister Oehau. For three days the queen suspended the law forbidding a Tahitian to marry a foreigner, gave Princess Oehau the title ari'i Taimai, and they married.

Their daughter, Salmon's sister, Johanna Marau Ta'aroa (1846–1934), married her first cousin, the future King Pōmare V, and was de facto ruler as Queen Marau (1877–1880) until he abdicated to the French colonial government. Another daughter married the Scottish merchant John Brander.

Alexander Ariʻipaea Salmon was their son, Alexander Jr., known as "Pa'ea" (Mangarevan for 'hobble'). He inherited his father's business interests and became co-owner with Brander of the Maison Brander copra and coconut oil plantations in Tahiti, the Marquesas, and the Cook Islands.

== Easter Island ==
The Maison Brander owned a large sheep ranch on Easter Island for exporting wool. The ranch was managed by the power-hungry convicted murderer Jean-Baptiste Dutrou-Bornier, who had acquired additional land and appointed his Rapanui wife "Queen". This was the low point in the island's history; by 1872 its resident population had been reduced to 111.

In 1871, Alexander Jr had picked up rudimentary Rapanui from his hundreds of indentured Easter Island labourers at the Mahina coconut plantation on Tahiti. In 1877, Queen Pōmare IV died, and Alexander's sister became regent. John Brander also died that year, and Dutrou-Bornier was assassinated. Alexander set off for Easter Island to manage the sheep station in around October 1878 with twenty Tahitian workers and an unknown number of Rapanui whose indentures had expired and ran the island for a decade. He introduced the coconut, the first sizeable tree on the island since its deforestation two centuries earlier, apart from some fruit trees at the SSCC Catholic mission and Dutrou-Bornier's estate.

Salmon returned to Tahiti in 1883–1884 for business. Upon his return to Easter Island he bought up all remaining land apart from the SSCC mission at Hanga Roa. As owner of nearly all the island and sole source of employment, Salmon was de facto ruler.

As he was not a religious man, and a Jew, the priests did not like him, especially Hippolyte Roussel, who had been forced to leave the island in 1871 due to conflict with Dutrou-Bornier but who visited again in 1879. Bishop Jaussen in Tahiti appointed a Rapanui, Atamu te Kena, "king" to protect church interests from the Maison Brander, but Salmon ignored him and he never had any influence. However, Salmon was an honest man and sincerely interested in the welfare of the people, and the population started to recover. This was the era of the strong Tahitian influence on the Rapanui language and culture.

In addition to wool exports, Salmon developed a tourist industry. He encouraged the manufacture of Rapanui artworks, including imitation rongorongo inscriptions, and helped sell them to passing ships for good prices as cultural artefacts, though he never claimed they were genuine. The artisans knew currency exchange rates and could deal with Europeans and Americans on their own terms.

Salmon served as the principal informant for the British and German archaeological expeditions to the island in 1882 and for the Americans in 1886, as guide, translator, and hotelier.

Cooke, surgeon of the USS Mohican, which dropped anchor in December 1886, said,

Mr Salmon, who is guide, philosopher, and friend to these people, unites in his person (and being a giant in stature, he can well contain them) the duties of referee, arbiter, judge. They entertain the greatest respect for him; evince the utmost affection; look up to him as their master; go to him with all their troubles; refer to him all their disputes and grievances. His word is law, and his decisions final and undisputed.

The information Salmon provided, despite its often poor quality, is still among the most important of Easter Island's early historical period. He also sent three genuine rongorongo tablets to his niece's husband, Heinrich August Schlubach, the German consul of Valparaíso, which are now kept in Vienna and Berlin.

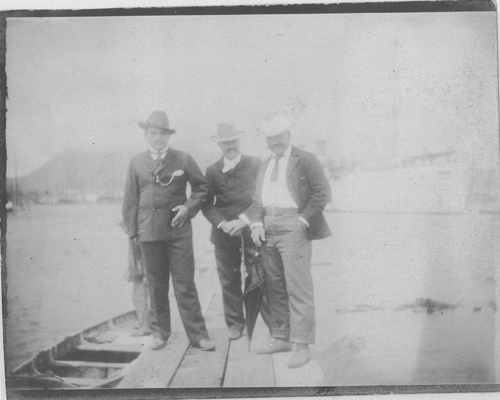
Salmon with Hawaiian Prince Kūhiō in 1907

Salmon sold the Brander Easter Island holdings to the Chilean government on 2 January 1888 and signed as a witness to the cession of the island. He returned to Tahiti in December of that year. He left for the remote Tuamotu Islands after being arrested and put in prison for assault and battery. He collected the oral histories of the people of the Tuamotus. He moved to San Francisco in later life and was involved in a scheme to marry ex-Queen Liliuokalani of Hawaii, who he claimed he had been engaged to from birth. The plot was merely a heist to take Liliuokalani's money to pay his debt. He died in 1914.

== Ancestry ==
Ancestors of Alexander Ariʻipaea Salmon

4. John Solomon
2. Alexander Salmon
10. Solomon Polack
5. Catherine Polack
11. Sarah
1. Alexander Ari'ipaea Salmon
6. Tupua-Ta'aroa, of Teraimarou
3. Princess Oehau

== Family tree ==
Salmon-Ariʻitaimai family tree (partial)

			Alexander; Salmon (1820–1866)	Ariʻitaimai (1821–1897)
Titaua; Salmon (1842–1898)	Tepau; Salmon (1843–1844)	Moetia; Salmon (1848–1935)	Tati; Salmon (1850–1918)	Ariʻipaea; Salmon (1855–1918)	Nariʻi; Salmon (1856–1906)	Marau; Salmon (1860–1934)	Beretania; Salmon (1863–1894)	Manihinihi; Salmon (1866–1919)

Notes:
- Salmon, Ernest (1964). Alexandre Salmon, 1820–1866, et sa femme Ariitaimai, 1821–1897: deux figures de Tahiti à l'époque du protectorat. Paris: Société des Océanistes. doi:10.4000/books.sdo.777. ISBN 9782854300420. OCLC 6229240.

== Bibliography ==
- Fischer, Stephen. 2005. Island at the End of the World: The Turbulent History of Easter Island. Reaktion Books ISBN 1-86189-282-9
