= Adèle de Dombasle =

French traveller and illustrator

Gabrielle Adélaide Garreau (called Adèle Mathieu de Dombasle), known as Adèle de Dombasle, was a French traveller and illustrator, who worked in the French Pacific territories during the 19th century. Her illustrations are detailed and show notable indigenous figures such as Pomare IV and King Temoana of Nuku Hiva. On her return to France she published an account of her experiences. She has been compared to figures such as Rose de Freycinet, Jeanne Leenhardt and Margaret Stokes, who were other early explorers and pioneers of women's archaeology in the Pacific.

== Biography ==
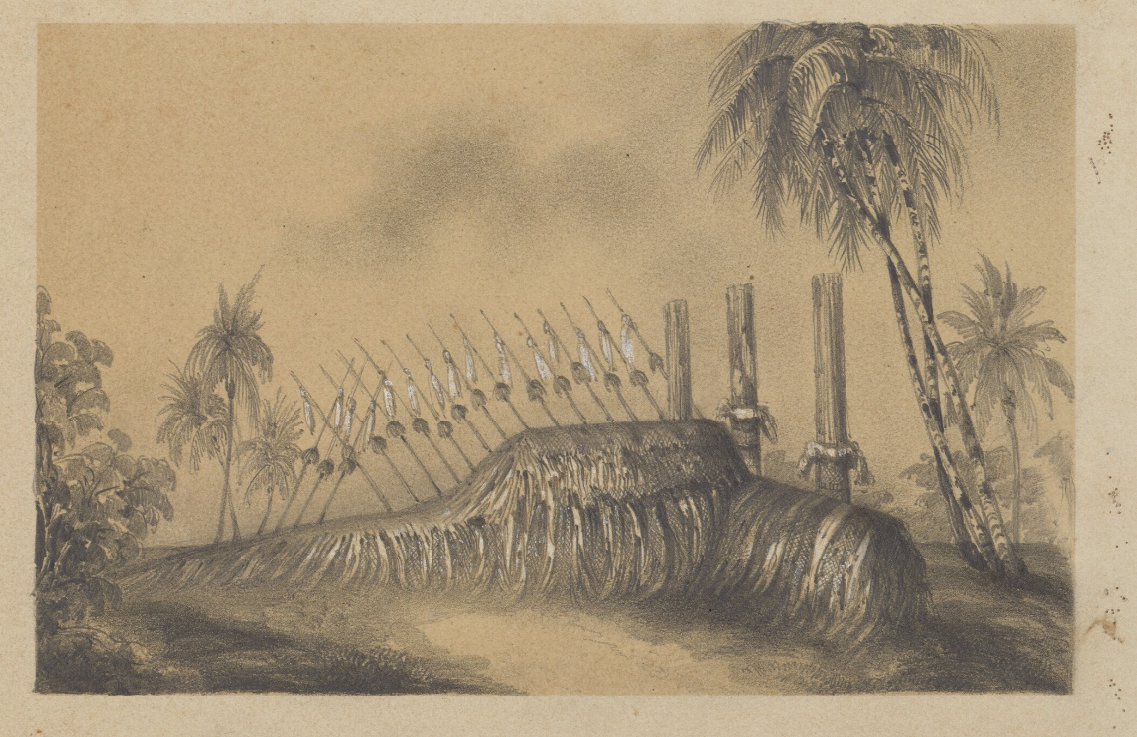
Tomb of the son of the high priest Vékétou in Nuku-Hiva by de Dombasle, 1847–48

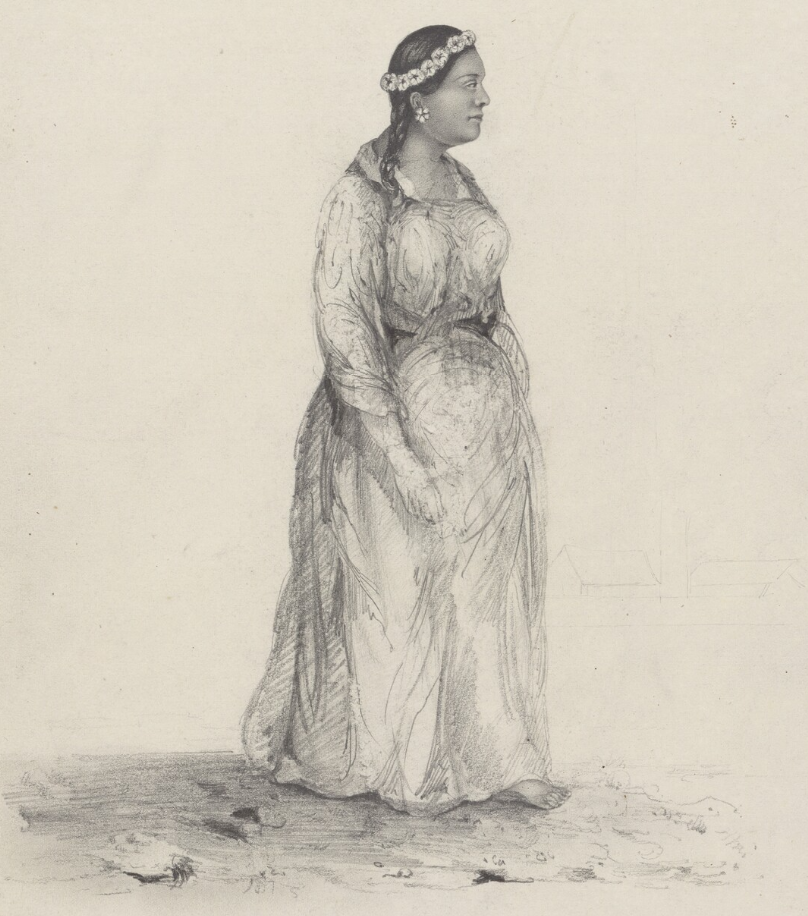
Pomare IV, queen of Tahiti by de Dombasle

Born in 1819 in Nancy, she came from an aristocratic family. She travelled to the Pacific in 1847 accompanying Edmond Ginoux de la Coche, who had been sent on a mission by the French Ministry of Foreign Affairs. Ginoux was tasked in part with building expanding ethnographic collections relating to the indigenous peoples he was to encounter; part of this collecting programme was the creation of illustrations, undertaken by de Dombasle. Their expedition was cut short: they spent one week in the Marquesas Islands and one week in Tahiti, before Ginoux was asked to leave by the Governor of the latter. By 1851, de Dombasle had returned to France.

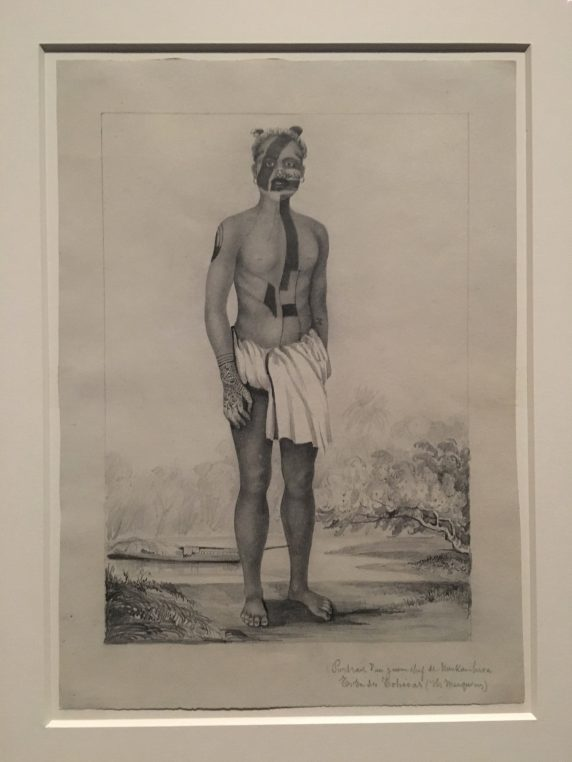
Young chief Nuku-Hiva, by de Dombasle

The illustrations made by de Dombasle are intricately detailed and depict important indigenous figures, such as Queen Pomaré IV, as well as landscapes, objects and the natural world. Her botanical illustrations are so specific that they can be used for identification. She also has a role in Ginoux's collecting activities, for example a sperm whale tooth now in the Musée des Explorations du monde was presented to de Dombasle by the 'priestess Hina' during a naming ceremony. The pictures are also an important source for archaeologists. One illustration, of a young chief, is similar to one made by René Gillotin.

In 1851 she published an account of her time travelling in the journal La Politique Nouvelle. It shows that she was knowledgeable about the people, places and events that she was encountering, and that prior to the expedition she had spoken to people who had previously travelled there. After Ginoux's death in 1870, de Dombasle inherited his ethnographic collection and appears to have been the person who secured its future, by selling it on to the Museum of the Baron Lycklama (the forerunner of the Museum of World Exploration).

== Legacy ==
De Dombasle's illustrations were featured in a 2022 exhibition entitled Si Tahiti m'était contée. Ginoux, journaliste et voyageur en Polynésie au XIXe siècle (If I Were Told the Story of Tahiti. Ginoux, Journalist and Traveler in 19th Century Polynesia), which was held at the Musée des Explorations du monde in Cannes. The Musée du Quai Branly-Jacques Chirac holds a collection of 17 of her pencil drawings. Historian Emilie Dotte-Sarout views de Dombasle as a pioneer of women's exploration and archaeology in the Pacific, along with figures such as Rose de Freycinet, Jeanne Leenhardt and Margaret Stokes.
