= René Gillotin =

French painter

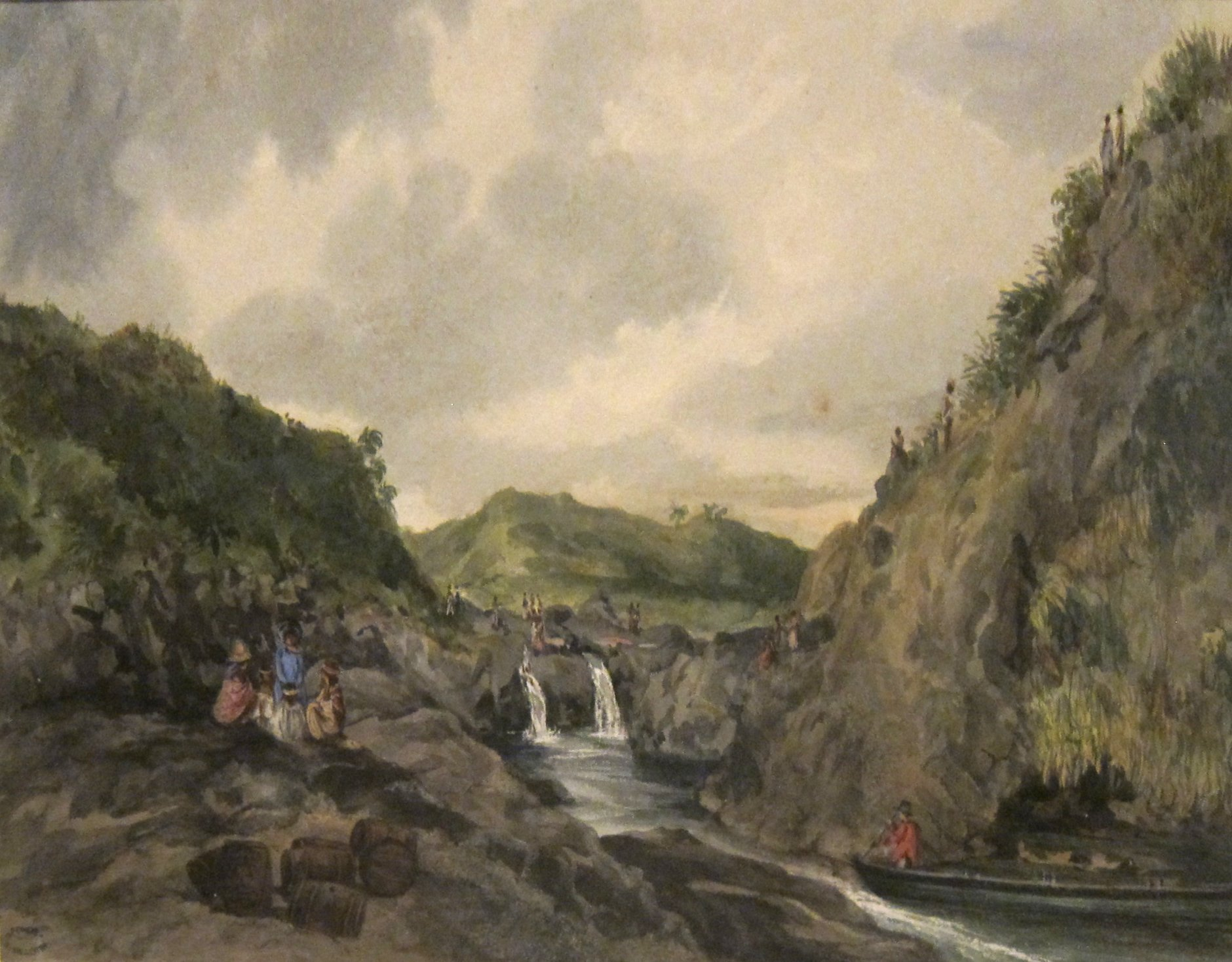
Landing in Byron [Hilo] Bay, Hawai’i Island, watercolor over graphite on paper by René Gillotin, c. 1844-48, Honolulu Museum of Art

Auguste René Gillotin (1814–1861) was a French naval officer and painter. He was born in Normandy and entered the naval school at Brest, France. His first campaign was to South America in 1833, with a first stop at Gorée in Senegal. 1844-1846 he visited French Polynesia on the frigate La Virginie. After promotion to lieutenant, he visited Senegal again in 1852 on the steam frigate Eldorado. He served in the Crimean War as a commander, and made many drawings and watercolor paintings throughout his naval career.

François Jacquin, a nephew of René Gillotin, came upon a trove of writings, drawings, sketches and watercolors by his uncle. Based upon this discovery, he published De Constantinople a Tahiti: Seize ans d'aquarelles autour du monde, 1840-1856, en suivant Rene Gillotin in 1997. Gillotin’s style is typical of mid-19th-century French painting. Although he is best known for his images of French Polynesia and Constantinople, he also drew and painted (presumably from life) in Africa, South America and Hawaii.
