= Alexander Salmon =

British merchant

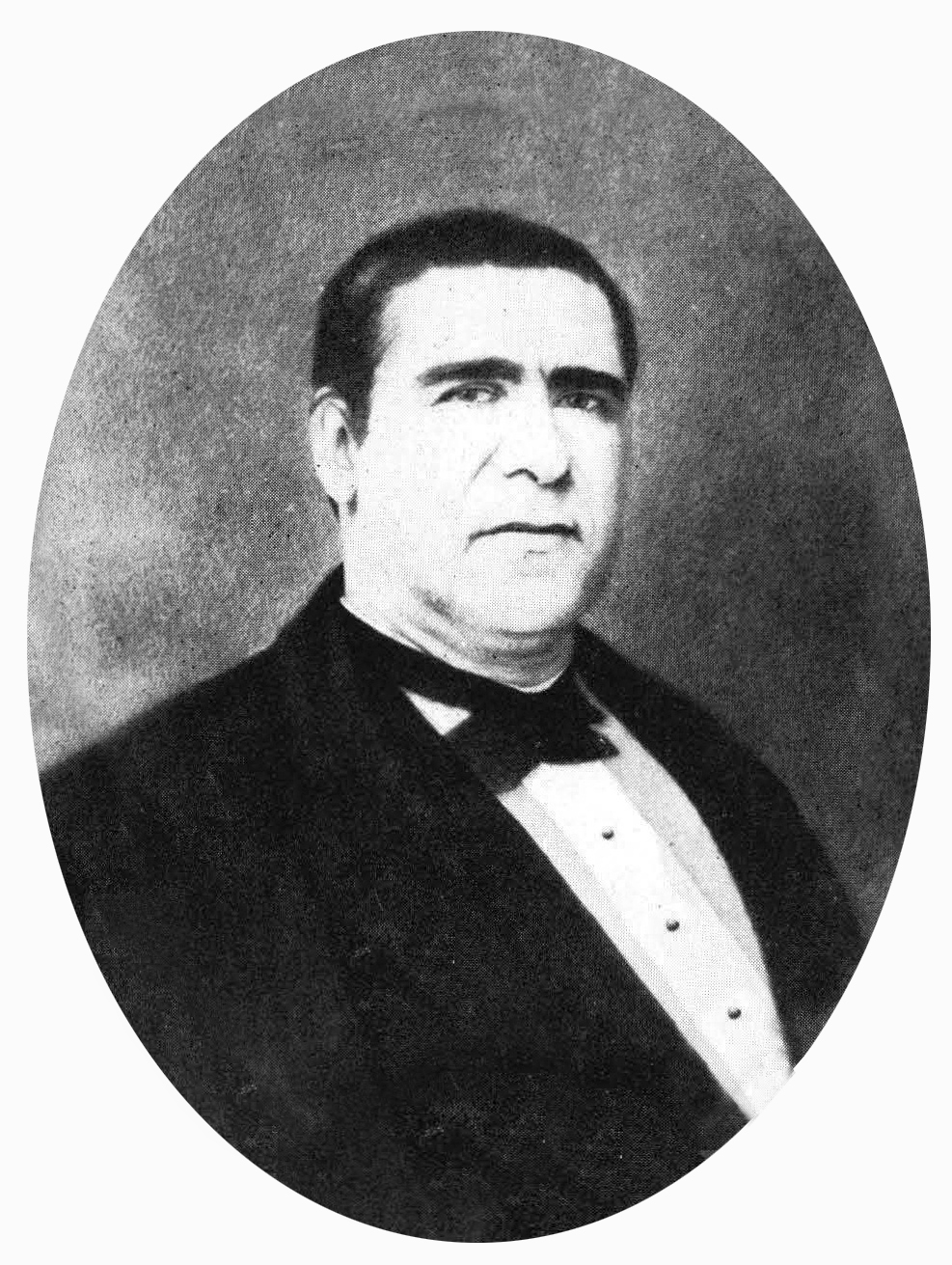
Alexander Salmon, c. 1865.

Alexander Salmon (1820 – 6 August 1866) was an English merchant who was the first Jew to reside in Tahiti. He became secretary to Queen Pōmare IV and married her adopted half-sister. Through his daughter's marriage to John Brander his family formed part of the influential Salmon/Brander Clan of Tahiti.

== Birth and early life ==
Salmon was born Alexander Solomon in 1820 in Hastings, England. While often described as "the scion of a British Jewish banking family", his background was quite different. His father, John Solomon, was a fruiterer or greengrocer selling from a store in Piccadilly. He improved his background when he arrived in Tahiti at age 19 in 1841. This is not surprising when it is considered how he was treated by British and European visitors to Tahiti. An example of this was Captain Henry Byam Martin, commander of HMS Grampus, who in 1847 described Salmon as, "... a low swindling bankrupt Jew from London." On his mother Rebecca's side, Alexander was a grandson of a renowned Jewish miniaturist artist, Solomon Polack. His maternal uncle was Joel Samuel Polack.

== Marriage and children ==
In January 1842, Salmon married Princess Oehau, Ari'i Ari'ioehau Ari'ita'ima'i Hinari'i (1824 – 24 June 1897), later given the title ari'i. She was the adoptive daughter of King Pōmare II's widow, the mother of Pōmare III and Pōmare IV. Considered one of the highest ranking chiefesses in the land, she was head of the Teva clan, the traditional rivals of the Pōmare family, and descended from Chief Amo and Queen Purea who received the first European explorer to Tahiti Samuel Wallis in 1767. In 1846, she was considered a rival candidate to the Tahitian throne by the French governor Armand Joseph Bruat in the event that Queen Pōmare IV did not to return from her self-imposed exile to Raiatea and comply with a French protectorate over Tahiti.

The union of Salmon and Ali'i|ari'i produced the following children:

- Tetuanui Reiaitera'iatea Titaua Salmon (3 November 1842 – 25 September 1898), married in 1856 John Brander; and in 1878 George Darsie with whom she moved to Anstruther in Scotland, where she died and is buried
- Ernest Tepauari'i'iahurai Salmon (December 1843 – April 1844)
- Ari'ino'ore Moetia Salmon (3 March 1848 – 1935), married Dorence Atwater
- Ari'i Teuraitera'i Tati Salmon (1852 – 5 December 1918)
- Alexander Ari'ipaea Vehiaitipare Salmon (4 August 1855 – 1914)
- Jean Nari'ivaihoa Tepau Marama Salmon (24 October 1856 – 6 February 1906)
- Queen Johanna Marau Ta'aroa a Tepau Salmon (24 April 1860 – 2 February 1934), married King Pōmare V
- Lois Beretania "Pri" Salmon (23 March 1863 – 25 May 1894)
- Alexandria Manihinihi "Cheeky" Salmon (1 October 1866 – 2 December 1918), married her nephew Norman Brander

Salmon-Ariʻitaimai family tree (partial)

| | | | Alexander; Salmon (1820–1866) | Ariʻitaimai (1821–1897) |
| Titaua; Salmon (1842–1898) | Tepau; Salmon (1843–1844) | Moetia; Salmon (1848–1935) | Tati; Salmon (1850–1918) | Ariʻipaea; Salmon (1855–1918) | Nariʻi; Salmon (1856–1906) | Marau; Salmon (1860–1934) | Beretania; Salmon (1863–1894) | Manihinihi; Salmon (1866–1919) |

Notes:
- Salmon, Ernest (1964). Alexandre Salmon, 1820–1866, et sa femme Ariitaimai, 1821–1897: deux figures de Tahiti à l'époque du protectorat. Paris: Société des Océanistes. doi:10.4000/books.sdo.777. ISBN 9782854300420. OCLC 6229240.

== Salmon/Brander Clan ==
For four decades from the 1840s, the Alexander Salmon and John Brander families, who were of English, Scottish and Tahitian ethnicity, were important socially, commercially and politically in Tahiti. They married into the Tahitian royal families, and were aligned through marriage and commerce with each other. A daughter of the second generation married the last King of Tahiti and was for many years known as 'the last Queen of Tahiti'. This royal connection was a major part of the prestige of what became a 'clan'. As each of family had nine children, the clan was numerically strong but on the founders' deaths many were still very young. Commercial naivety, familial distrust, poor staff management and infighting over inheritances led to the disappearance of the clan within a generation.

== Life in Tahiti ==
The author Herman Melville described him thus: “The lady he wedded being a near kinswoman of the queen, he became a permanent member of her majesty's household. This adventurer rose late, dressed theatrically in calico and trinkets, assumed a dictatorial tone in conversation, and was evidently on excellent terms with himself. We found him reclining on a mat, smoking a reed-pipe of tobacco, in the midst of an admiring circle of chiefs and ladies. He must have noticed our approach; but instead of rising and offering civilities, he went on talking and smoking, without even condescending to look at us."

== Death ==
Salmon died on 6 August 1866 in Papeete, Tahiti.
