= George Pritchard (missionary) =

British missionary and diplomat (1796–1883)

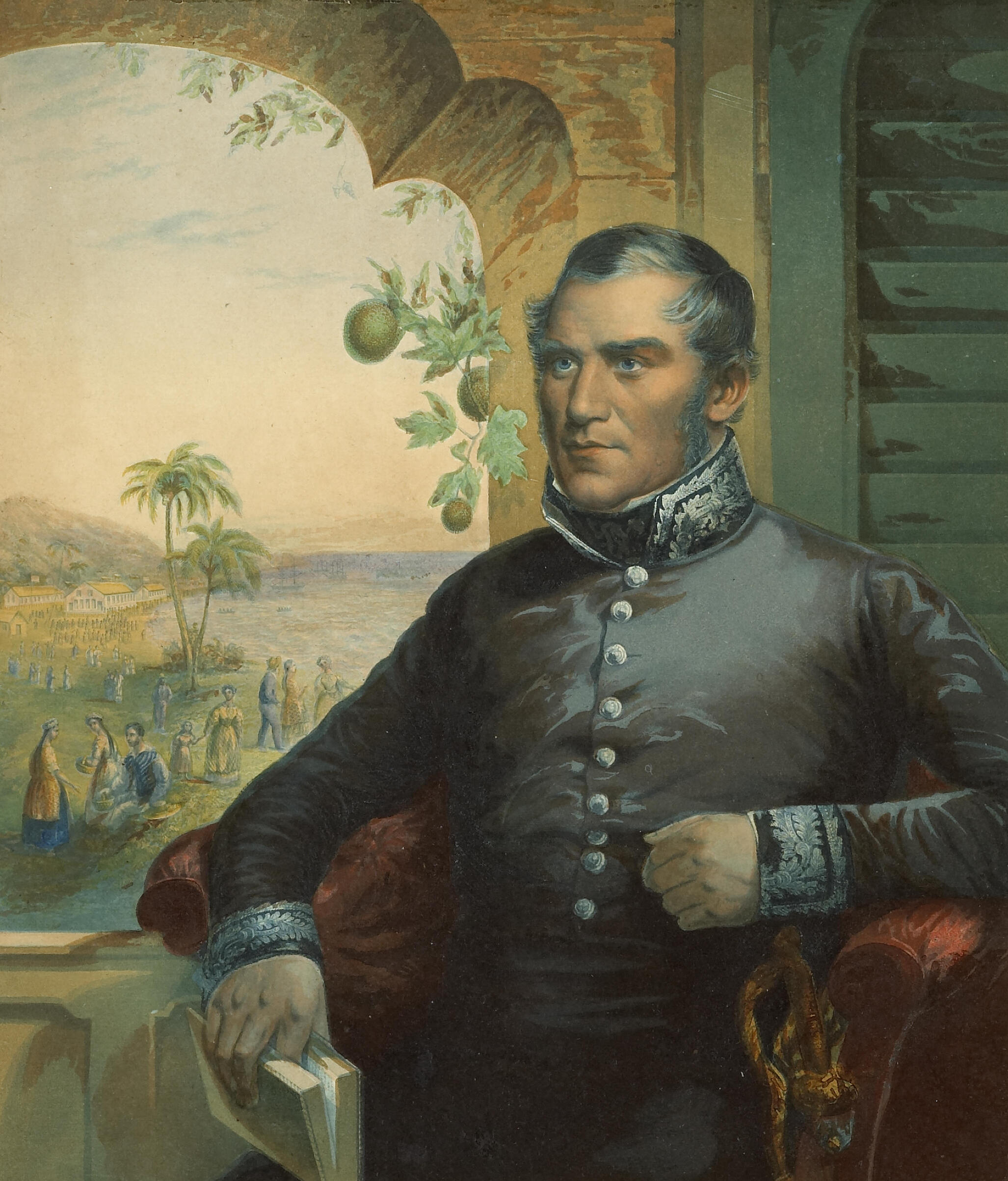
1845 portrait of Pritchard by George Baxter

George Pritchard (1 August 1796 – 6 May 1883) was a British missionary and diplomat. Pritchard was born in Birmingham and studied at the mission seminary at Gosport. In 1824 he travelled to the Society Islands to undertake work for the London Missionary Society. While there, he campaigned against rival French Catholic missionaries, leading the French to demand compensation and threaten to bombard Papeete. In 1837, he was appointed British consul at Tahiti, advising Queen Pōmare IV. The Islands were annexed by France in spite of his protests, in 1843. He was compelled to leave the islands in 1844 and returned to England. In 1845, he was appointed British consul at Samoa, resigning in 1856 and subsequently living in retirement in England.

In 1844, he published his memoir The Missionary's Reward: Or, the Success of the Gospel in the Pacific, with a second printing in the year of publication. In 1845, George Pritchard was appointed British consul to Samoa. He resigned in 1856 and returned to England. His wife died in 1871, and he remarried shortly afterwards. In 1878, he published Queen Pomare and her Country, an account of his Tahitian experience. He died of bronchitis on 6 May 1883 at his home in Hove.

In 1845, George Pritchard was appointed British consul to Samoa. During his time in Samoa, he had a son named George Ayleen Pritchard (1825–1895), who married Atalina Selby Pritchard, the daughter of Leiataua, the high chief of Manono. Their three sons, George Ayleen Pritchard (1825–1895), William Francis (Frank) Pritchard (1865–1928), and Alfred James Pritchard (1867–1944), established the foundation for the Pritchard connections in Samoa. Vaigaga, a village on the main island of Upolu in Samoa, serves as the headquarters of the Pritchard family in the country. To this day, most of them have chosen to live there and have spread across the Samoan islands through marriage and intercultural lineage with the Samoans. Some children stayed in Samoa, but others remained in England or were married and moved elsewhere in Polynesia.

== See also ==
- Jarnac Convention

== Publications ==
Pritchard, George (1844). The Missionary's Reward: Or, The Success of the Gospel in the Pacific. London: John Snow.
