= Pōmare IV =

Queen of Tahiti from 1827 to 1877

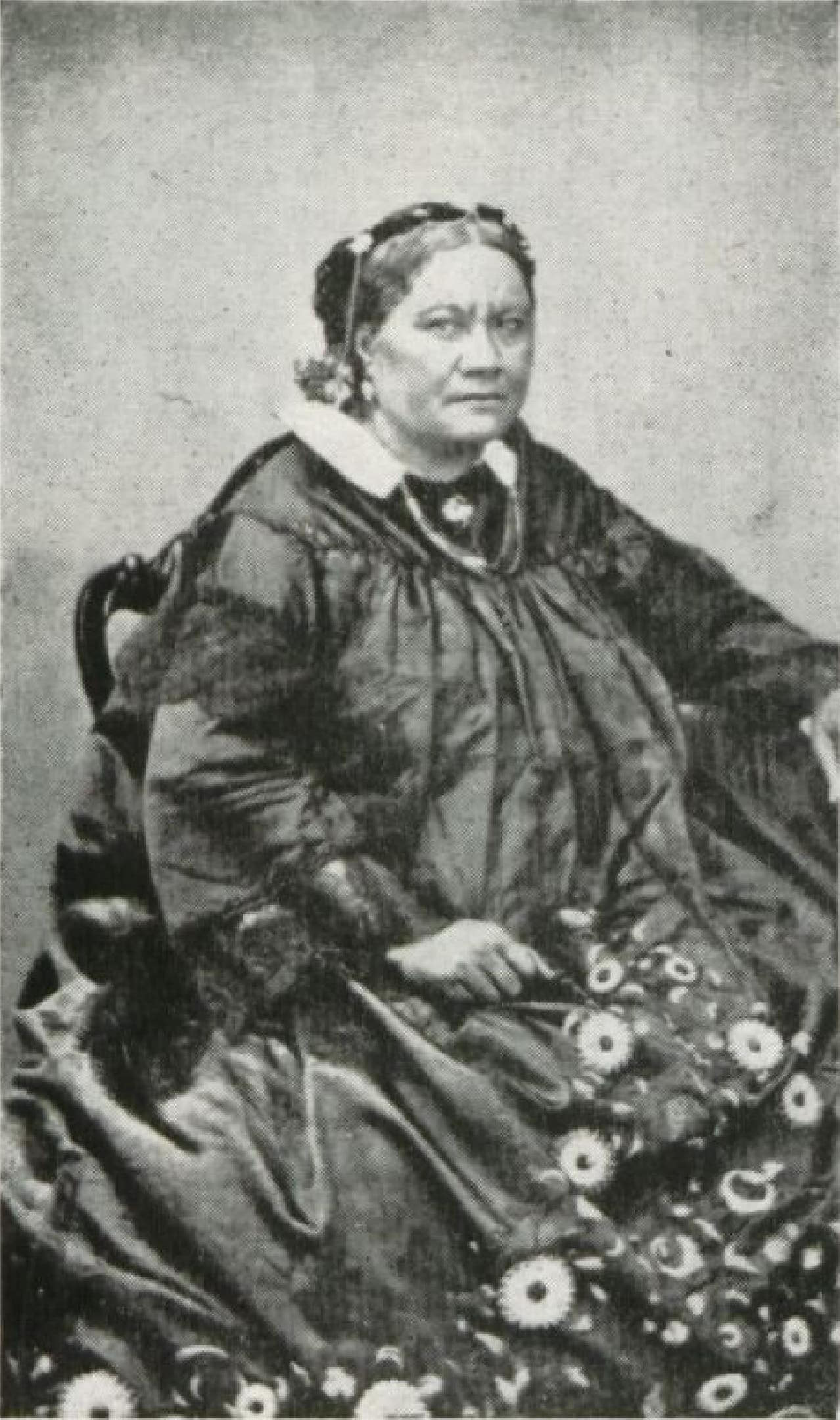

Queen of Tahiti
- Reign: 11 January 1827 – 17 September 1877
- Predecessor: Pōmare III
- Successor: Pōmare V
- Regent: Teriʻitariʻa Ariʻipaeavahine; Teriʻitoʻoterai Teremoemoe; Council of Chiefs
- Born: 28 February 1813; Pare, Tahiti
- Died: 17 September 1877 (aged 64); Royal Palace, Papeete, Tahiti
- Burial: Pōmare Royal Cemetery, Papaʻoa, ʻArue
- Spouse: Tapoa II; Ariʻifaʻaite
- Issue among others: Ariʻiaue; Pōmare V Teriʻimaevarua II; Tamatoa V Punuariʻi Teriʻitapunui; Teriʻitua Tuavira
Names
- ʻAimata Pōmare IV Vahine-o-Punuateraʻitua
- House: House of Pōmare
- Father: Pōmare II
- Mother: Teriʻitoʻoterai Tere-moe-moe
- Religion: Mamaia (syncretism between Maohi beliefs and Anglican Christianity)
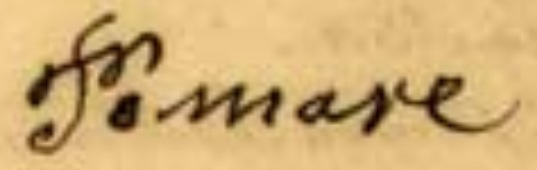
- Signature

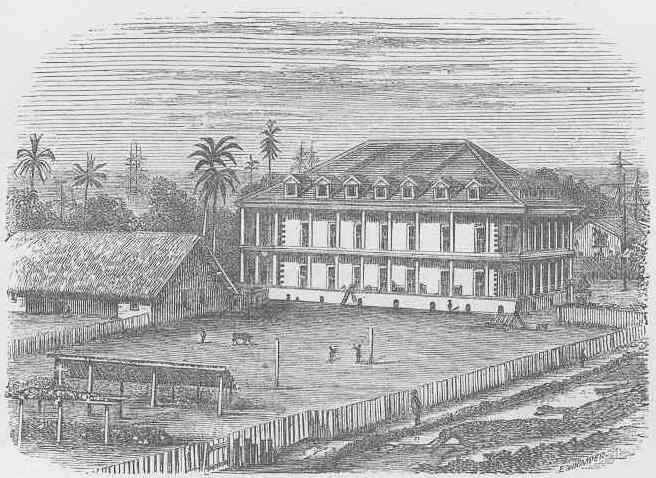
Queen Pomare's Palace, Tahiti (LMS, 1869, p. 30)

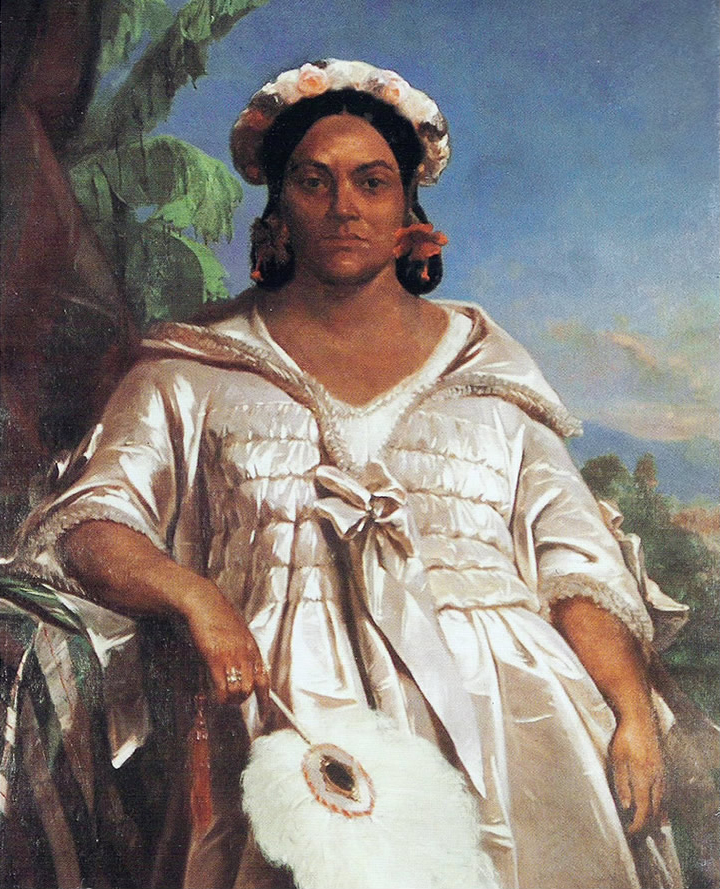
Queen Pōmare IV, portrait by Charles Giraud, Musée de Tahiti et des Îles

Pōmare IV (28 February 1813 – 17 September 1877), more properly ʻAimata Pōmare IV Vahine-o-Punuateraʻitua (otherwise known as ʻAimata – "eye-eater", after an old custom of the ruler to eat the eye of the defeated foe), was the Queen of Tahiti between 1827 and 1877. She was the fourth monarch of the Kingdom of Tahiti.

== Family ==
Pōmare was the daughter of Pōmare II and Teriʻitoʻoterai Tere-moe-moe, his second wife. Her grandfather was Pōmare I.

She succeeded as ruler of Tahiti after the death of her brother Pōmare III when she was only 14 years old.

== Biography ==
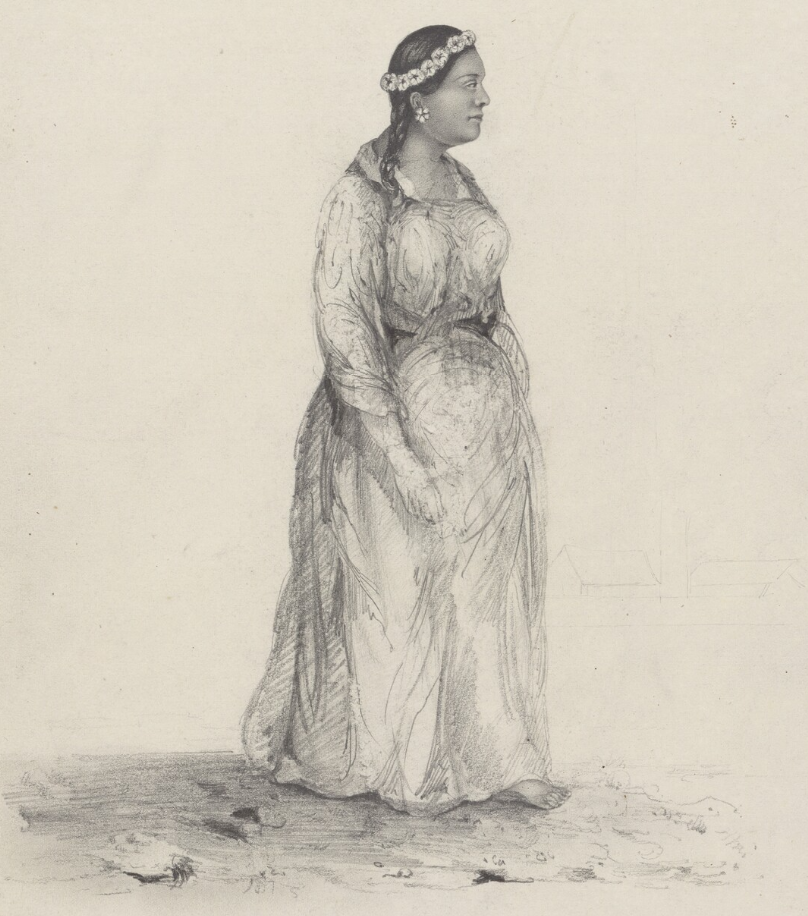
Pomare IV by Adele de Dombasle, at Musee du Quai Branly

In 1843, the French declared Tahiti a French protectorate and installed a governor at Papeete. She fought in vain against French intervention, writing to the King Louis Philippe I of France and Queen Victoria, asking in vain for British intervention, and exiling herself to Raiatea in protest. What followed was the bloody French-Tahitian War which lasted from 1843 to 1847, involving every kingdom of the Society Islands. The Tahitians suffered many casualties, but the French losses were also great. Although the British never assisted the Tahitians, they actively condemned France and war nearly broke between the two powers in the Pacific. These conflicts ended in the defeat of the Tahitian forces at the Fort of Fautaua. The French were victorious, but they weren't able to annex the island due to diplomatic pressure from Great Britain, so Tahiti and Moorea continued to be ruled under the French protectorate. A clause to the war settlement was that Queen Pōmare's allies in Huahine, Raiatea, and Bora Bora would be allowed to remain independent.

Pōmare IV eventually relented and ruled under the French administration from 1847 until 1877. She attempted to install her children in positions of power in Tahiti and the Leeward Islands. Three of her children were to become monarchs in their own right: King Pōmare V of Tahiti (r. 1877–1880), Queen Teriʻimaevarua II of Bora Bora (r. 1860–1873), King Tamatoa V of Raiatea-Tahaa (r. 1857–1871).

Pōmare IV died on 17 September 1877. She is buried in the Royal Mausoleum, Papaʻoa, ʻArue. She was succeeded by Pōmare V, who reigned 1877–1880.

== Issue ==
In December 1822, Pōmare married the future King Tapoa II of Taha'a and Bora Bora. In 1830, Tahiti was visited by HMS Seringapatam, and her captain William Waldegrave noted in his diary with some surprise that Pōmare was then sixteen years old and married but had no children. The marriage remained childless and ended with the Queen repudiating it on the ground that Tapoa was sterile.

On 5 December 1832, Pōmare was married again, this time to her first cousin, Tenaniʻa Ariʻifaʻaite a Hiro (10 January 1820 – 6 August 1873). By her second husband, she had issue:

1. A boy (1833, died young), died of dysentery.
2. Henry Pōmare (August 1835, died young), died of dysentery.
3. Ariʻiaue Pōmare (12 August 1838 – 10 May 1856), Crown Prince of Tahiti, Ariʻi of Afaʻahiti.
4. Pōmare V (3 November 1839 – 12 June 1891), succeeded as King of Tahiti.
5. Teriʻimaevarua II (23 May 1841 – 12 February 1873), succeeded as Queen of Bora Bora.
6. Tamatoa V (23 September 1842 – 30 September 1881), succeeded as King of Ra'iātea and Taha'a.
7. Victoria Pōmare-vahine (1844 – June 1845).
8. Punuariʻi Teriʻitapunui Pōmare (20 March 1846 – 18 September 1888), Ariʻi of Mahina and President of the Tahitian High Court.
9. Teriʻitua Tuavira Pōmare (17 December 1847 – 9 April 1875), Ariʻirahi of Hitiaʻa, called "Prince Joinville".
10. Tevahitua Pōmare (1850/1852, died young).

== Ancestry ==
Ancestors of Pōmare IV

8. Teu Tunuieaite Atua
4. Pōmare I of Tahiti
9. Tetupaia-i-Hauiri
2. Pōmare II of Tahiti
10. Teihotu-i-Ahura’i
5. Tetua-nui-reia-i-te-raʻi-atea
11. Vave’a Tetua-nui-rei-a-ite Ra’iatea
1. Pōmare IV
12. Vetea-raʻi Uʻuru
6. Tamatoa IV of Raiatea
13. Opai-pai Te-roro
3. Teri’to'-o-terai Tere-moe-moe
14. Mato Teri’i Tepoara’i
7. Tu-ra’i-ariʻi E-he-vahine
15. Te-ha’apapa I of Huahine

== Bibliography ==
- Baldwin, J. R. (June 1938). "England and the French Seizure of the Society Islands". The Journal of Modern History. 10 (2). Chicago: University of Chicago Press: 212–231. doi:10.1086/243524. JSTOR 1898837. OCLC 4642653458. S2CID 144138675.
- Bennett, Frederick Debell (1840). Narrative of a Whaling Voyage Round the Globe from the Year 1833 to 1836: Comprising Sketches of Polynesia, California, the Indian Archipelago, Etc. With an Account of Southern Whales, the Sperm Whale Fishery, and the Natural History of the Climates Visited. London: R. Bentley. OCLC 1382866.
- Cuzent, Gilbert (1860). Îles de la société Tahiti: considérations géologiques, météorologiques et botaniques sur l'île. État moral actuel des Tahitiens, traits caractéristiques de leurs moeurs, végétaux susceptibles de donner des produits utiles au commerce et a l'industrie, et de procurer des frets de retour aux navires, cultures et productions horticoles, catalogue de la flore de Tahiti, dictionnaire Tahitien. Rochefort: Impr. Thèze. OCLC 13494527.
- Dodd, Edward (1983). The Rape of Tahiti. New York: Dodd, Mead & Company. ISBN 978-0-396-08114-2. OCLC 8954158.
- Fayaud, Viviane (January 2006). "A Tahitian Woman in Majesty: French Images of Queen Pomare". History Australia. 3 (1). Melbourne: Monash University Publishing: 12.1 – 12.6. doi:10.2104/ha060012. OCLC 4644118741. S2CID 143839491.
- Great Britain. Parliament. House of Commons (1843). "Correspondence Relative to the Proceedings of the French at Tahiti, 1825–1843.". Accounts and Papers. London: T. R. Harrison. pp. 265–292.
- Gunson, Niel (July 1987). "Sacred Women Chiefs and Female 'Headmen' in Polynesian History". The Journal of Pacific History. 22 (3). Canberra: Australian National University: 139–172. doi:10.1080/00223348708572563. JSTOR 25168930. OCLC 5543864601.
- Henry, Teuira; Orsmond, John Muggridge (1928). Ancient Tahiti. Vol. 48. Honolulu: Bernice Pauahi Bishop Museum. OCLC 3049679.
- London Missionary Society (1845). The Juvenile Missionary Magazine (and Annual). Vol. 2. London: London Missionary Society.
- London Missionary Society (1846). The Juvenile Missionary Magazine (and Annual). Vol. 3. London: London Missionary Society.
- Lucett, Edward (1851). Rovings in the Pacific, from 1837 to 1849: with a glance at California. Vol. 2. Longman, Brown, Green, and Longmans.
- Matsuda, Matt K. (2005). "Society Islands: Tahitian Archives". Empire of Love: Histories of France and the Pacific. New York: Oxford University Press. pp. 91–112. ISBN 978-0-19-534747-0. OCLC 191036857.
- Mortimer, Favell Lee (1838). The Night of Toil; or, A Familiar Account of the Labors of the First Missionaries in the South Sea Islands (1 ed.). London: J. Hatchard & Son. OCLC 752899081.
- Mortimer, Favell Lee (1869). The Night of Toil; or, A Familiar Account of the Labors of the First Missionaries in the South Sea Islands (6 ed.). London: J. Hatchard & Son. OCLC 9676610.
- Newbury, Colin (1986). "Commissioner George Brown at Tahiti, 1843". Hawaiian Journal of History. 20. Hawaiian Historical Society: 83–104. hdl:10524/470.
- O'Brien, Patricia (April 2006). "'Think of Me as a Woman': Queen Pomare of Tahiti and Anglo-French Imperial Contest in the 1840s Pacific". Gender & History. 18 (1). Oxford: Blackwell: 108–129. doi:10.1111/j.1468-0424.2006.00417.x. OCLC 663096915. S2CID 143494777.
- Pritchard, George (1983). The Aggressions of the French at Tahiti: And Other Islands in the Pacific. Oxford: Oxford University Press. ISBN 978-0-19-647994-1. OCLC 10470657.
- Pritchard, George (1878). Queen Pomare and Her Country. London: Elliot Stock. OCLC 663667911.
- Sissons, Jeffrey (2014). The Polynesian Iconoclasm: Religious Revolution and the Seasonality of Power. New York: Berghahn Books. ISBN 978-1-78238-414-4. JSTOR j.ctt9qcvw9. OCLC 885451227.
- Stevenson, Karen (June 2014). "ʻAimata, Queen Pomare IV: Thwarting Adversity in Early 19th Century Tahiti". The Journal of the Polynesian Society. 123 (2). Wellington: The Polynesian Society: 129–144. doi:10.15286/jps.123.2.129-144. JSTOR 43286236. OCLC 906004458.
- Teissier, Raoul (1978). "Chefs et notables des Établissements Français de l'Océanie au temps du protectorat: 1842–1850". Bulletin de la Société des Études Océaniennes (202). Papeete: Société des Études Océaniennes. OCLC 9510786.
- Ward, Adolphus William; Gooch, George Peabody (1922). The Cambridge History of British Foreign Policy. Vol. 2. CUP Archive. pp. 182–185.

== Succession ==
Regnal titles
Preceded by Pōmare III	Queen of Tahiti; 1827–1877	Succeeded by Pōmare V
