= Tofari =

Island in the Society Islands, French Polynesia

Coordinates: 16.480°S 151.696°W

Tofari Island
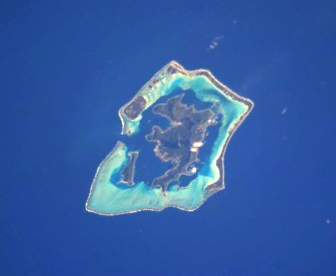
- The Bora Bora Group.
- Interactive map of Tofari Island

Geography
- Location: Pacific Ocean
- Archipelago: Society Islands
- Area: 1.132 km^{2} (0.437 sq mi)
- Highest elevation: 0 m (0 ft)

Administration
- France
- Commune: Bora Bora Commune
- Island Group: Bora Bora
- Largest settlement: Tenamanu (pop. 20 inhabitants)

Demographics
- Population: 40 (2016)
- Pop. density: 35/km^{2} (91/sq mi)

Motu Tofari is a 1.132 km^{2} (0.4 sq mi) island in the Bora Bora Islands Group, within the Society Islands of French Polynesia. It is the located between Taufarii, and Ome.

The island has some private households.

== Administration ==
The island is part of Bora Bora Commune.

== Demographics ==
Tenamanu, the main village of the island, is on the north west corner, next to the Four Seasons Resort. Its current population includes many private households as the resorts staff usually commute daily to the piers of the resorts

== Tourism ==
The Island boasts many resorts.

- Near the island of Taufarii, is St. Regis Resort.

The resort has extended Tofari with an artificial island inside the lagoon.

- Four Seasons operates the large Four Seasons Resort Bora Bora

== Wildlife ==
Ruahatu Lagoon Sanctuary is located on the island.

== Transportation ==
After arriving in Fa'a'ā International Airport, an Air Tahiti inter-island flight (50 minutes) will bring you to Bora Bora Airport.

You will need to board the airline's catamaran shuttle to Vaitape, where resorts staff take boats to the island.
