= Bora Bora Island =

Island in French Polynesia

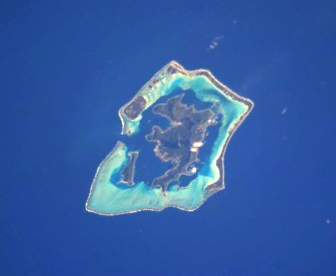
- The Island of Bora Bora in the center of the Bora Bora Group.
- Interactive map of Bora Bora Island

Geography
- Location: Pacific Ocean
- Archipelago: Society Islands
- Area: 19.91 km^{2} (7.69 sq mi)
- Highest elevation: 727 m (2385 ft)
- Highest point: Mount Otemanu

Administration
- France
- Overseas collectivity: French Polynesia
- Administrative subdivision: Leeward Islands
- Commune: Bora Bora Commune
- Largest settlement: Vaitape (pop. 4,927 inhabitants)

Demographics
- Population: 9455 (2016)
- Pop. density: 475/km^{2} (1230/sq mi)

Bora Bora Island is a 19.91 km^{2} (8 sq mi) island in the Bora Bora Islands Group, within the Society Islands of French Polynesia. It is the main island of the commune of the same name. Together with its surrounding islands of Tapu, Ahuna, Tevairoa, Tane, Mute, Tufari, Tehotu, Pitiaau, Sofitel, Toopua, and Toopuaiti, it forms the group of Bora Bora.

== See also ==
- List of volcanoes in French Polynesia
- List of reduplicated place names
