= Haapiti Rahi =

Private island in the lagoon of Bora Bora in French Polynesia

Coordinates: 16.460°S 151.770°W

Haapiti Rahi Island
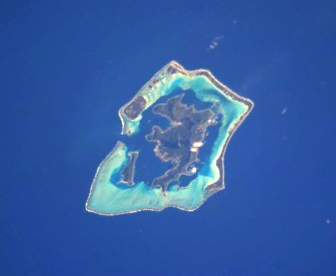
- The Bora Bora Group.
- Interactive map of Haapiti Rahi Island

Geography
- Location: Pacific Ocean
- Archipelago: Society Islands
- Area: 0.02 km^{2} (0.0077 sq mi)
- Highest elevation: 0 m (0 ft)

Administration
- France
- Commune: Bora Bora Commune
- Island Group: Bora Bora
- Largest settlement: Haapiti Rahi (pop. 0)

Demographics
- Population: 0 (2016)
- Pop. density: 0/km^{2} (0/sq mi)

Haapiti Rahi, also known as Motu Haapiti Rahi, is a 1 ha (0.010 km^{2}) private island in the lagoon of Bora Bora in French Polynesia. It is located between Krisu, and Tevairoa, near Haapiti Iti.

== Administration ==
The island is part of Bora Bora Commune, more specifically Faanui.

== Tourism ==
The island was sold by the end of 2024. Teva Victor and Vanessa Lejolivet's child Mana Victor was born on the island 1 January 2005.

== Transportation ==
After arriving in Fa'a'ā International Airport, an Air Tahiti inter-island flight (50 minutes) will bring visitors to Bora Bora Airport. There, one can hire a boat.
