= Tupe (Bora Bora) =

Islet in Bora Bora, French Polynesia

Coordinates: 16.4994°S 151.700°W

Tupe Island
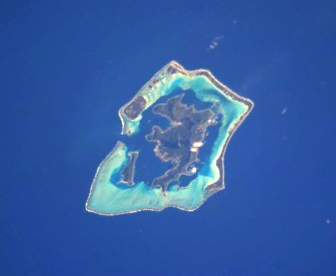
- The Bora Bora Group.
- Interactive map of Tupe Island

Geography
- Location: Pacific Ocean
- Archipelago: Society Islands
- Area: 0.014 km^{2} (0.0054 sq mi)
- Highest elevation: 0 m (0 ft)

Administration
- France
- Commune: Bora Bora Commune
- Island Group: Bora Bora
- Largest settlement: Lagoonarium (pop. 0)

Demographics
- Population: 0 (2016)
- Pop. density: 0/km^{2} (0/sq mi)

Motu Tupe is a 14-acre (0.057 km^{2}) private island in the lagoon of Bora Bora in French Polynesia. It is the located between Tape and Taufarii.

== History ==
Motu Tupe is well known in Bora Bora as being the location of the Bora Bora Lagoonarium.

== Administration ==
The island is part of Bora Bora Commune.

== Tourism ==
The Lagoonarium is operated by the Le Meridien resort. On the island there is a pension

== Transportation ==
After arriving in Fa'a'ā International Airport, an Air Tahiti inter-island flight (50 minutes) will bring you to Bora Bora Airport.

There, you will need to hire a boat at the Rent-a-boat Office.
