= Toopua =

Coordinates: 16.52°S 151.77°W

Toopua Island
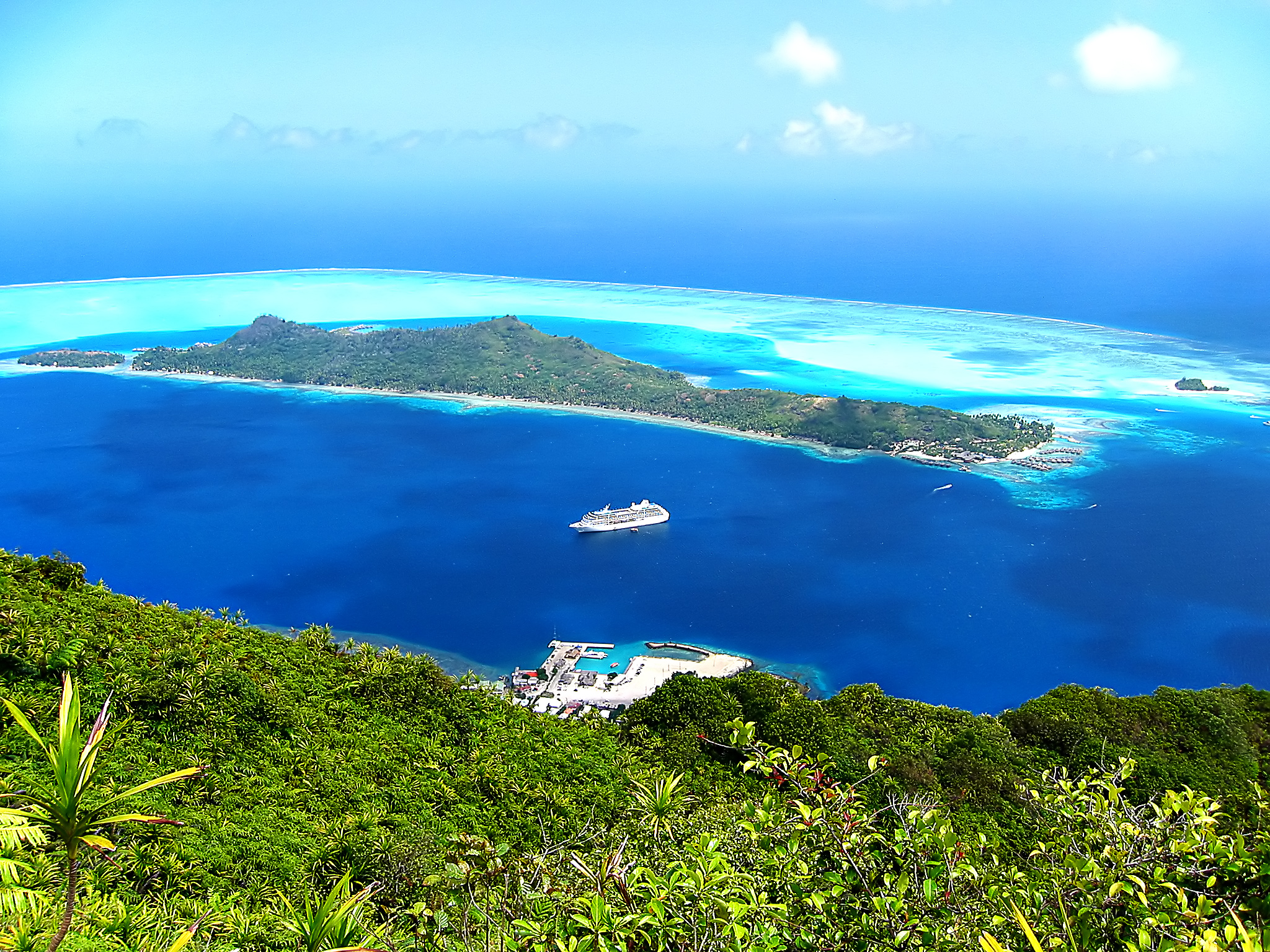
- Motu Toopua
- Interactive map of Toopua Island

Geography
- Location: Pacific Ocean
- Archipelago: Society Islands
- Area: 1.45 km^{2} (0.56 sq mi)
- Highest elevation: 148 m (486 ft)
- Highest point: Mount Mauaohunoa

Administration
- France
- Commune: Bora Bora Commune
- Island Group: Bora Bora
- Largest settlement: Ativahia (pop. 50 inhabitants)

Demographics
- Population: 70 (2016)
- Pop. density: 48.3/km^{2} (125.1/sq mi)

Motu Toopua is a 1.45 km^{2} (0.6 sq mi) island in the Bora Bora Islands Group, within the Society Islands of French Polynesia. It is the located between Toopua Iti, and Tapu.

== Geography ==
Motu Toopua in the west is a high island up to 148 m over the sea surface (Mount Mauaohunoa) of the rest of the former crater rim and also consists of volcanic rocks.

== History ==
On Toopua, as on the main island, was one of the stratified tribal societies (named Ativahia), and it was in constant rivalries and wars among the other tribes.

== Administration ==
The island is part of Bora Bora Commune.

== Demographics ==
Ativahia, the main village of the island, is on the south east corner, facing Bora Bora Island Toopua is the 2nd most populous island in the Bora Bora Commune. Its current population includes many private households and also the staff of the resorts on the island.

== Tourism ==
The Island boasts many resorts.

- Near the village of Teauratau, was the infamous Lagoon resort.
- Near Tehou Bay village, is the Banana Cafe and pension.
- At Mohio point, the southeast corner, is the biggest Bora Bora resort, called Conrad Hilton Bora Bora Nui. It was the location of Amazing Race filming.

== Transportation ==
After arriving in Fa'a'ā International Airport, an Air Tahiti inter-island flight (50 minutes) will bring you to Bora Bora Airport.

You will need to board the airline's catamaran shuttle to Vaitape, where you can hire a boat to Toopua. Conrad Hilton resort operates a helipad on the island.
