= Taufarii =

Island in French Polynesia

Coordinates: 16.489°S 151.697°W

Taufarii Island
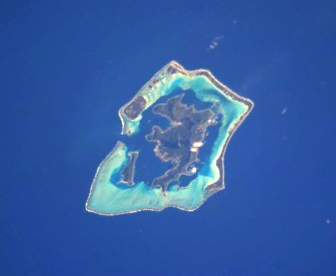
- The Bora Bora Group.
- Interactive map of Taufarii Island

Geography
- Location: Pacific Ocean
- Archipelago: Society Islands
- Area: 0.059 km^{2} (0.023 sq mi)
- Highest elevation: 0 m (0 ft)

Administration
- France
- Commune: Bora Bora Commune
- Island Group: Bora Bora
- Largest settlement: Taufarii (pop. 2 inhabitants)

Demographics
- Population: 2 (2016)
- Pop. density: 34/km^{2} (88/sq mi)

Motu Taufarii is a 0.059 km^{2} (0.0 sq mi) island in the Bora Bora Islands Group, within the Society Islands of French Polynesia. It is the located between Tupe, and Tofari.
