= Vananui =

Island in French Polynesia

Coordinates: 16.452°S 151.768°W

Vananui Island
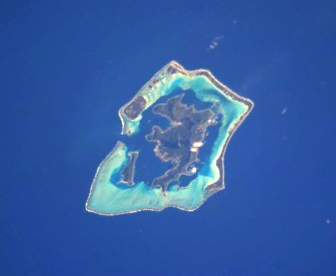
- The Bora Bora Group.
- Interactive map of Vananui Island

Geography
- Location: Pacific Ocean
- Archipelago: Society Islands
- Area: 0.013 km^{2} (0.0050 sq mi)
- Highest elevation: 0 m (0 ft)

Administration
- France
- Commune: Bora Bora Commune
- Island Group: Bora Bora
- Largest settlement: Vananui (pop. 5 inhabitants)

Demographics
- Population: 5 (2016)
- Pop. density: 385/km^{2} (997/sq mi)

Motu Vananui is a 0.013 km^{2} (0.0050 mi^{2}) island in the Bora Bora Islands Group, within the Society Islands of French Polynesia. It is the located between Paahi, and Mouti.

The island is the site of the small "Le Pension Paradis".

The nearest airport is Bora Bora Airport.

== Administration ==
The island is part of Bora Bora Commune. Its current population includes the family operating the hotel.
