= Mouti =

Island in the Society Islands, French Polynesia

Coordinates: 16.455°S 151.770°W

Moute Island
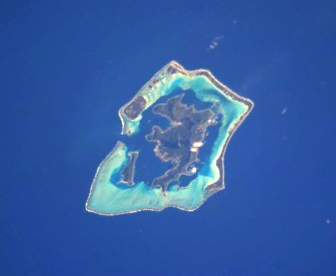
- The Bora Bora Group.
- Interactive map of Moute Island

Geography
- Location: Pacific Ocean
- Archipelago: Society Islands
- Area: 0.115 km^{2} (0.044 sq mi)
- Highest elevation: 0 m (0 ft)

Administration
- France
- Commune: Bora Bora Commune
- Island Group: Bora Bora
- Largest settlement: Moute (pop. 10 inhabitants)

Demographics
- Population: 10 (2016)
- Pop. density: 87/km^{2} (225/sq mi)

Motu Moute is a 0.115 km^{2} (0.044 sq mi) island in the Bora Bora Islands Group, within the Society Islands of French Polynesia. It is the located between Vananui, and Moute Iti.

The island is part of Bora Bora Commune. The nearest airport is Bora Bora Airport.
