= Paahi =

Private island in French Polynesia

Coordinates: 16.450°S 151.765°W

Paahi Island
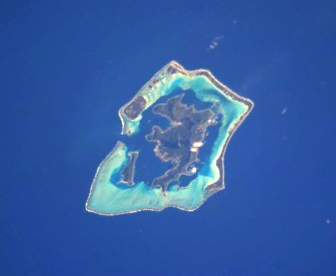
- The Bora Bora Group.
- Interactive map of Paahi Island

Geography
- Location: Pacific Ocean
- Archipelago: Society Islands
- Area: 0.19 km^{2} (0.073 sq mi)
- Highest elevation: 0 m (0 ft)

Administration
- France
- Commune: Bora Bora Commune
- Island Group: Bora Bora
- Largest settlement: Blue Heaven (pop. 20 inhabitants)

Demographics
- Population: 20 (2016)
- Pop. density: 104/km^{2} (269/sq mi)

Motu Paahi is a private island in the Bora Bora Islands Group, within the Society Islands of French Polynesia. It is located between Vananui and Tane. The island has a somewhat rocky shoreline and a view of nearby mountains.

== Administration ==
The island is part of Bora Bora Commune. Its current population includes the staff operating the hotel.

== Tourism ==
The island is the site of the Blue Heaven Island Resort.
