= Oume =

Oume may refer to:

- Oumé Department, a department of Côte d'Ivoire
  - Oumé, a city, as well as a sub-prefecture and seat of the department
- Oume, a character in Yotsuya Kaidan, a Japanese ghost story
- Daigoro Oume, a character in Kaizoku Sentai Gokaiger, a Japanese TV show/franchise

== See also ==
- Ome (disambiguation)
