= Nunue =

- Associated commune of Bora-Bora
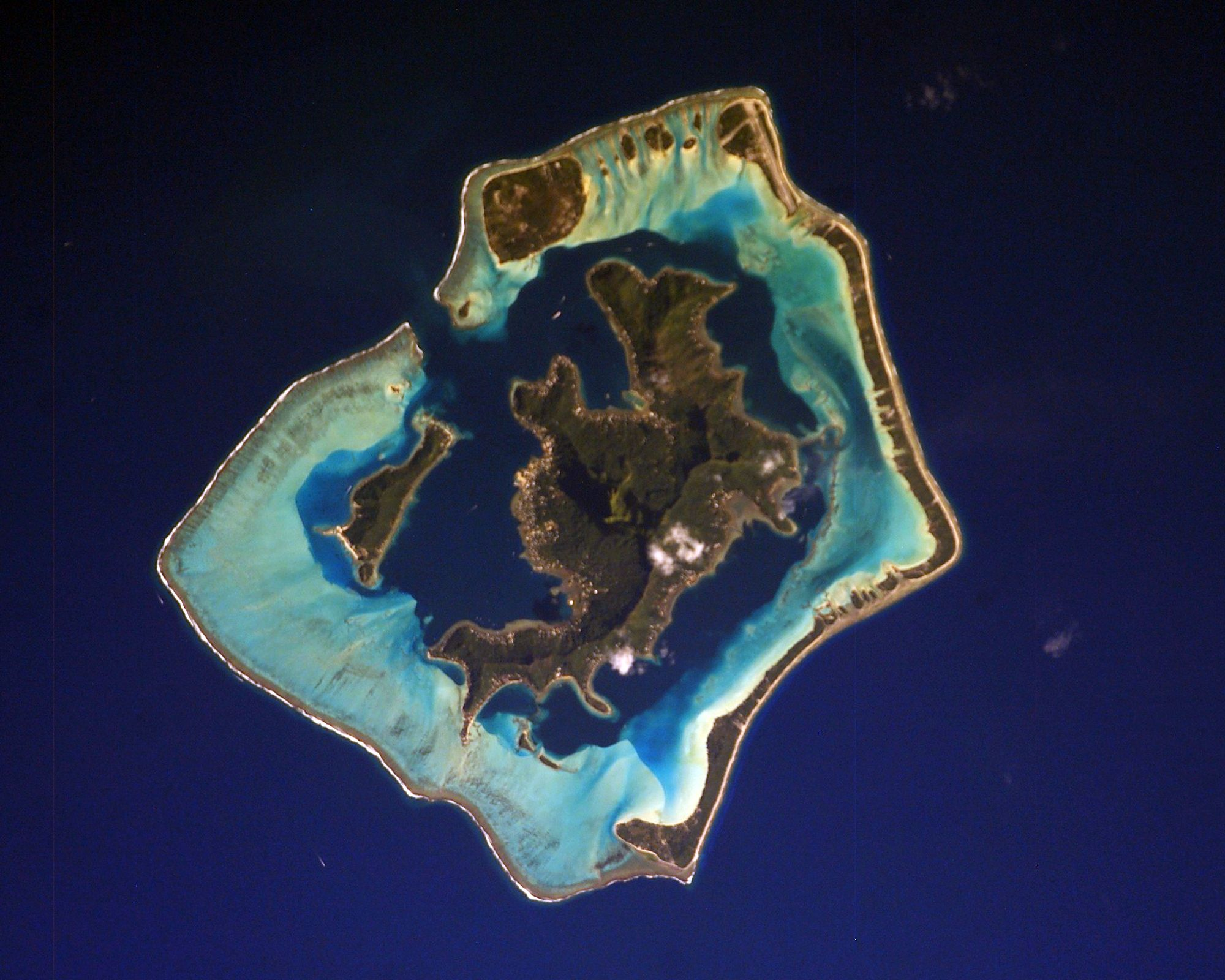
- Bora Bora, the island on which Nunue is located

- Location within French Polynesia
- Location of Nunue
- Coordinates: 16°30′54″S 151°44′5″W
- Country: France
- Overseas collectivity: French Polynesia
- Subdivision: Leeward Islands
- Commune: Bora-Bora
- Elevation: 6 m (20 ft)
- Population (2022): 5,541
- Time zone: UTC−10:00

Nunue is an associated commune on the island of Bora Bora, in French Polynesia. According to the 2022 census, it had a population of 5,541 people.
