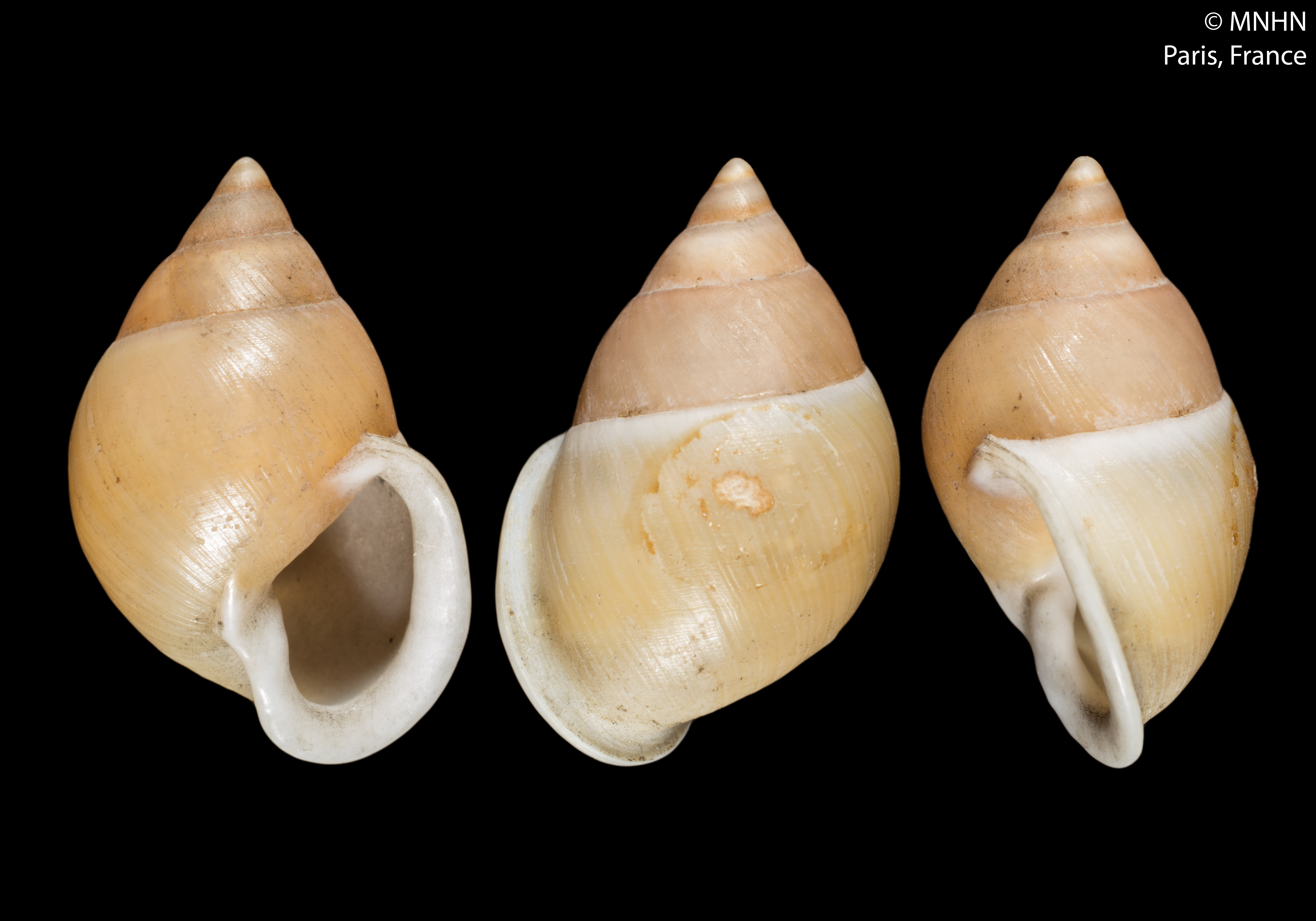

Conservation status
- Extinct (IUCN 3.1)

Scientific classification
- Kingdom: Animalia
- Phylum: Mollusca
- Class: Gastropoda
- Order: Stylommatophora
- Family: Partulidae
- Genus: Partula
- Species: †P. lutea

Binomial name
- †Partula lutea (Lesson, 1831)

= Partula lutea =

Extinct species of gastropod

Partula lutea was a species of air-breathing tropical land snail, a terrestrial pulmonate gastropod mollusk in the family Partulidae.

This species was endemic to Bora Bora, French Polynesia. It is now extinct. This was a relatively uniform species with several color forms and was originally exceedingly common on Mount Otemanu, yet was originally believed to have become extinct in the early 1990s. Evidence in the condition of recently collected shells show that P. lutea survived 10 years further than it had once been thought. Some shells have been found in lava tubes or under rocky overhangs in forests of Hibiscus tiliaceaus. The species had become extinct due to predation by flatworms, Euglandina, and Lissachatina species. A similar (if not conspecific) population has been discovered on Maupiti, an island near to Bora Bora, also represented by shells that may have been introduced to the island in the 19th century.
