= Ahuna (Bora Bora) =

Island in French Polynesia

Coordinates: 16.490°S 151.775°W

Motu Ahuna
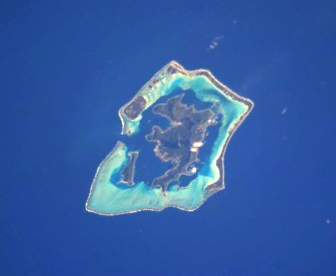
- The Bora Bora Group.
- Interactive map of Motu Ahuna

Geography
- Location: Pacific Ocean
- Archipelago: Society Islands
- Area: 0.04 km^{2} (0.015 sq mi)
- Highest elevation: 0 m (0 ft)

Administration
- France
- Commune: Bora Bora Commune
- Island Group: Bora Bora
- Largest settlement: Villa Ahuna (pop. 5 inhabitants)

Demographics
- Population: 5 (2016)
- Pop. density: 125/km^{2} (324/sq mi)

Motu Ahuna is a 0.04 km^{2} (0.0 sq mi) island in the Bora Bora Islands Group, within the Society Islands of French Polynesia. It is the located between Toopua, and Tevairoa.

The island is the site of the Villa Ahuna hotel. Villa Ahuna is located on the Southern end of Motu Ahuna.

The nearest airport is Bora Bora Airport.

== Administration ==
The island is part of Bora Bora Commune. Its current population includes the family operating the hotel.
