= Anau, Bora Bora =

Anau
- Associated commune of Bora-Bora
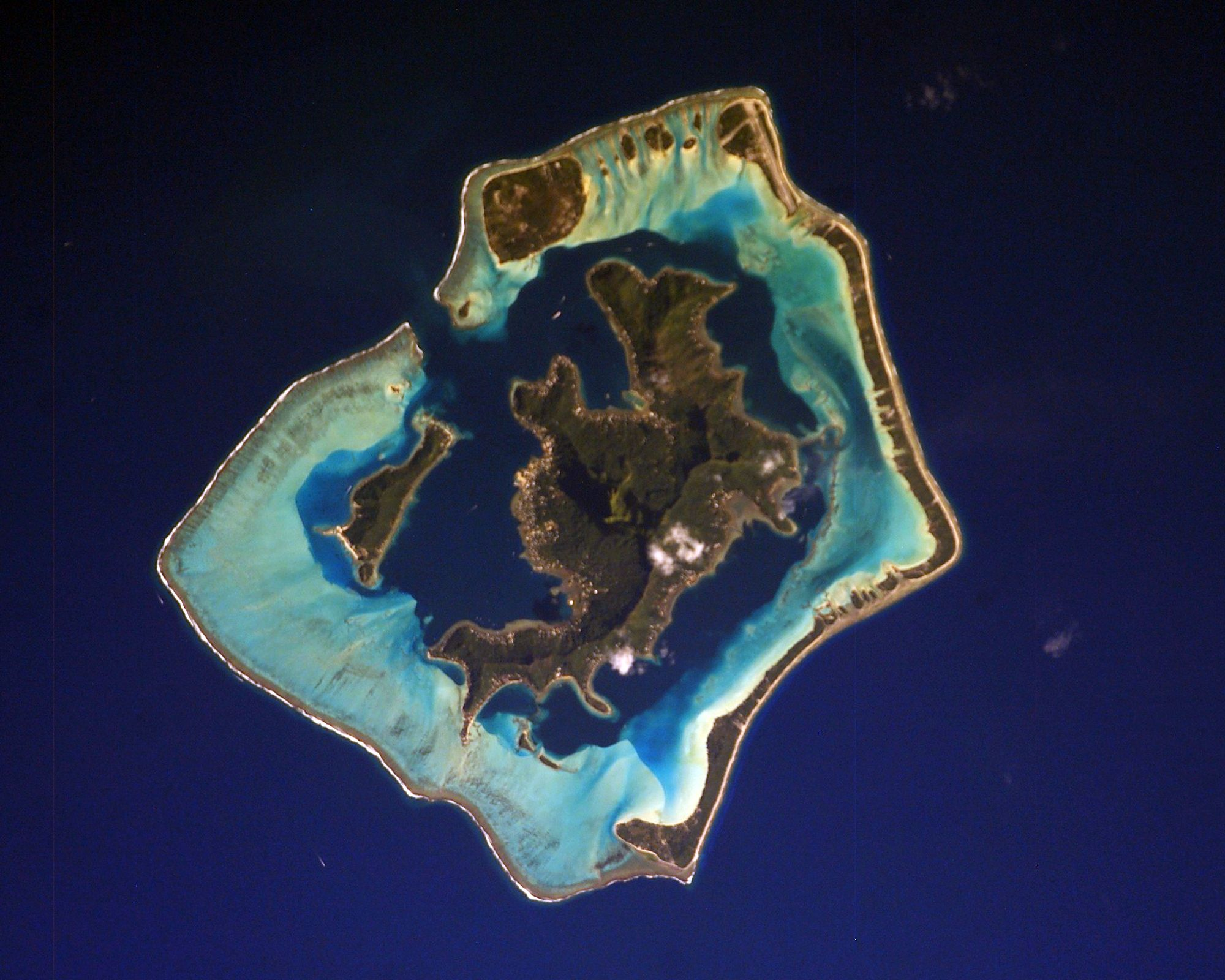
- Bora Bora, the island on which Anau is located

- Location within French Polynesia
- Location of Anau
- Coordinates: 16°30′17″S 151°43′19″W
- Country: France
- Overseas collectivity: French Polynesia
- Subdivision: Leeward Islands
- Commune: Bora-Bora
- Elevation: 6 m (20 ft)
- Population (2022): 1,905
- Time zone: UTC−10:00

Anau is an associated commune on the island of Bora Bora, in French Polynesia. According to the 2022 census, it had a population of 1,905 people.
