= Borabora =

Borabora may refer to:

- Bora Bora, an island group in the South Pacific
- Borabora, a synonym for a genus of plants, Cyperus
