= Tevairoa =

Island in French Polynesia

Coordinates: 16.471°S 151.778°W

Tevairoa Island
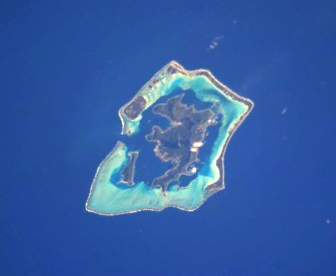
- The Bora Bora Group.
- Interactive map of Tevairoa Island

Geography
- Location: Pacific Ocean
- Archipelago: Society Islands
- Area: 2.363 km^{2} (0.912 sq mi)
- Highest elevation: 20 m (70 ft)
- Highest point: Tevairoa hill

Administration
- France
- Commune: Bora Bora Commune
- Island Group: Bora Bora
- Largest settlement: Tevairoa (pop. 20 inhabitants)

Demographics
- Population: 20 (2016)
- Pop. density: 8.5/km^{2} (22/sq mi)

Motu Tevairoa is a 2.363 km^{2} (0.9 sq mi) island in the Bora Bora Islands Group, within the Society Islands of French Polynesia. It is the located between Haapiti Rahi, and Ahuna.

== Geography ==
Motu Tevairoa is the second largest island in the Bora Bora group.

== Administration ==
The island is part of Bora Bora Commune.

== Demographics ==
Tevairoa, the main village of the island, is on the south corner.

== Tourism ==
The Island hosts the Le Bora Bora by Pearl Resorts.

== Transportation ==
After arriving in Fa'a'ā International Airport, an Air Tahiti inter-island flight (50 minutes) will bring you to Bora Bora Airport.

You will need to board the airline's catamaran shuttle to Vaitape, where you can hire a boat to Toopua. Conrad Hilton resort operates a helipad on the island.
