= Ome =

Ome or OME may refer to:

== Places ==
- Ome (Bora Bora), a public island in the lagoon of Bora Bora
- Ome, Lombardy, Italy, a town and comune in the Province of Brescia
- Ōme, Tokyo, a city in the Prefecture of Tokyo
- Ome (crater), a crater on Mars

== Transportation ==
- Ōme Line, a railway in the Prefecture of Tokyo
  - Ōme Station, a railway station in Ōme
  - Ōme (train), an express train on the Ōme Line
- OME, the IATA and FAA code for Nome Airport, Alaska

== Acronym ==
- Office of Manpower Economics, a body of the United Kingdom government
- Ontario Ministry of Education, Canada
- Open Microscopy Environment
- Osaka Mercantile Exchange
- Otitis media with effusion, the accumulation of fluid in the middle ear
- -ome, a suffix in biology and related sciences, associated with omics

== People ==
- Open Mike Eagle, a rapper from Los Angeles, California
- Jaslyn Ome, Playboy Playmate of the Month for April 2013

== Chemicals ==
- Polyoxymethylene dimethyl ethers Often abbreviated as OME3, OME4, OME5, and "OMEx" in papers where it is discussed as a Second-generation biofuel / Electrofuel

== See also ==
- Ōme Kaidō, a main road running through the city of Ōme
- OME-B, OME-C, OME-E and OME-Ant, parts of the MINERVA spacecraft
