= Faanui =

- Associated commune of Bora-Bora
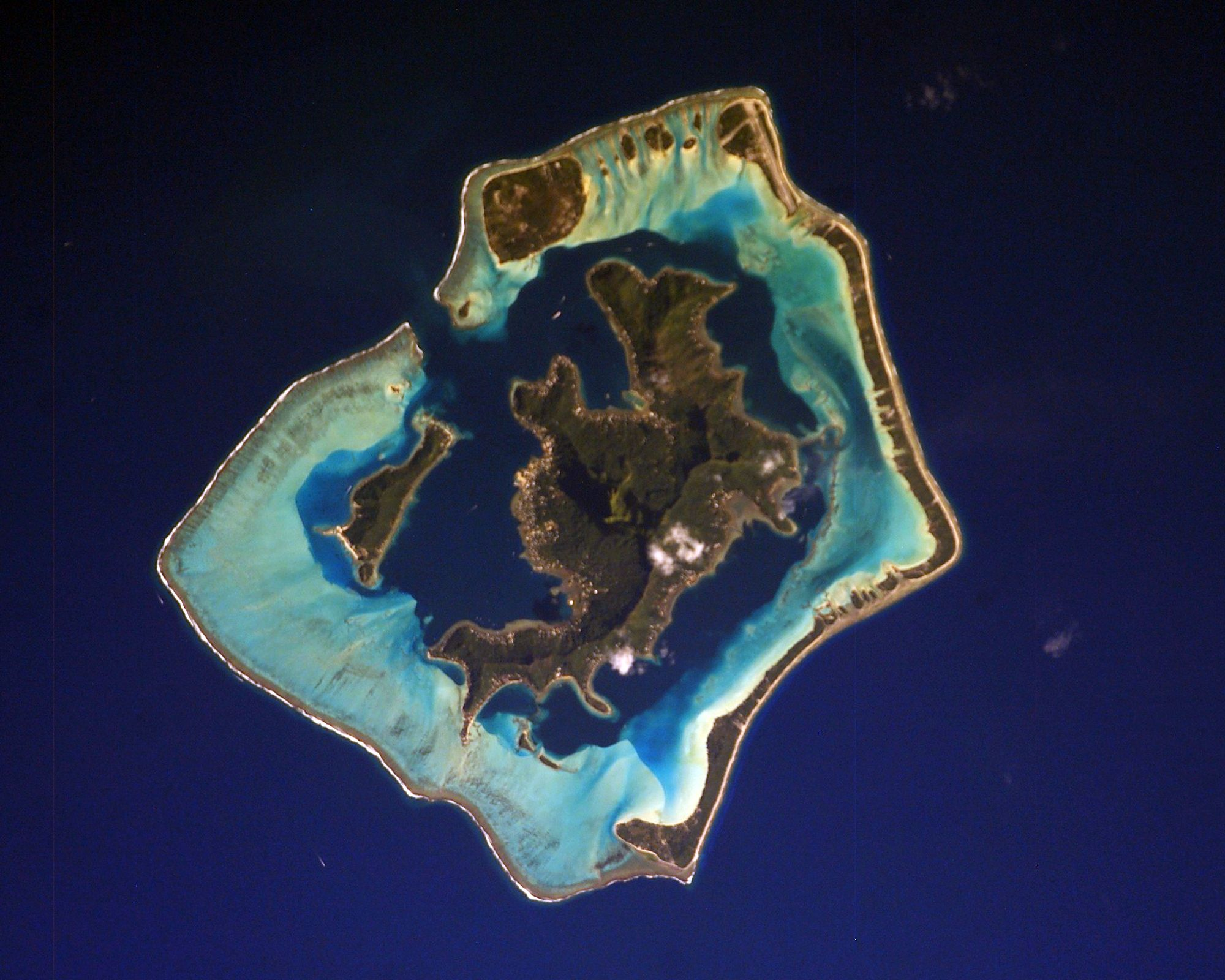
- Bora Bora, the island on which Faanui is located

- Location within French Polynesia
- Location of Faanui
- Coordinates: 16°29′19″S 151°44′37″W
- Country: France
- Overseas collectivity: French Polynesia
- Subdivision: Leeward Islands
- Commune: Bora-Bora
- Elevation: 5 m (16 ft)
- Population (2022): 3,312
- Time zone: UTC−10:00

Faanui is an associated commune on the island of Bora Bora, in French Polynesia. According to the 2022 census, it had a population of 3,312 people.
