= Mount Pahia =

Mountain in Bora Bora, French Polynesia

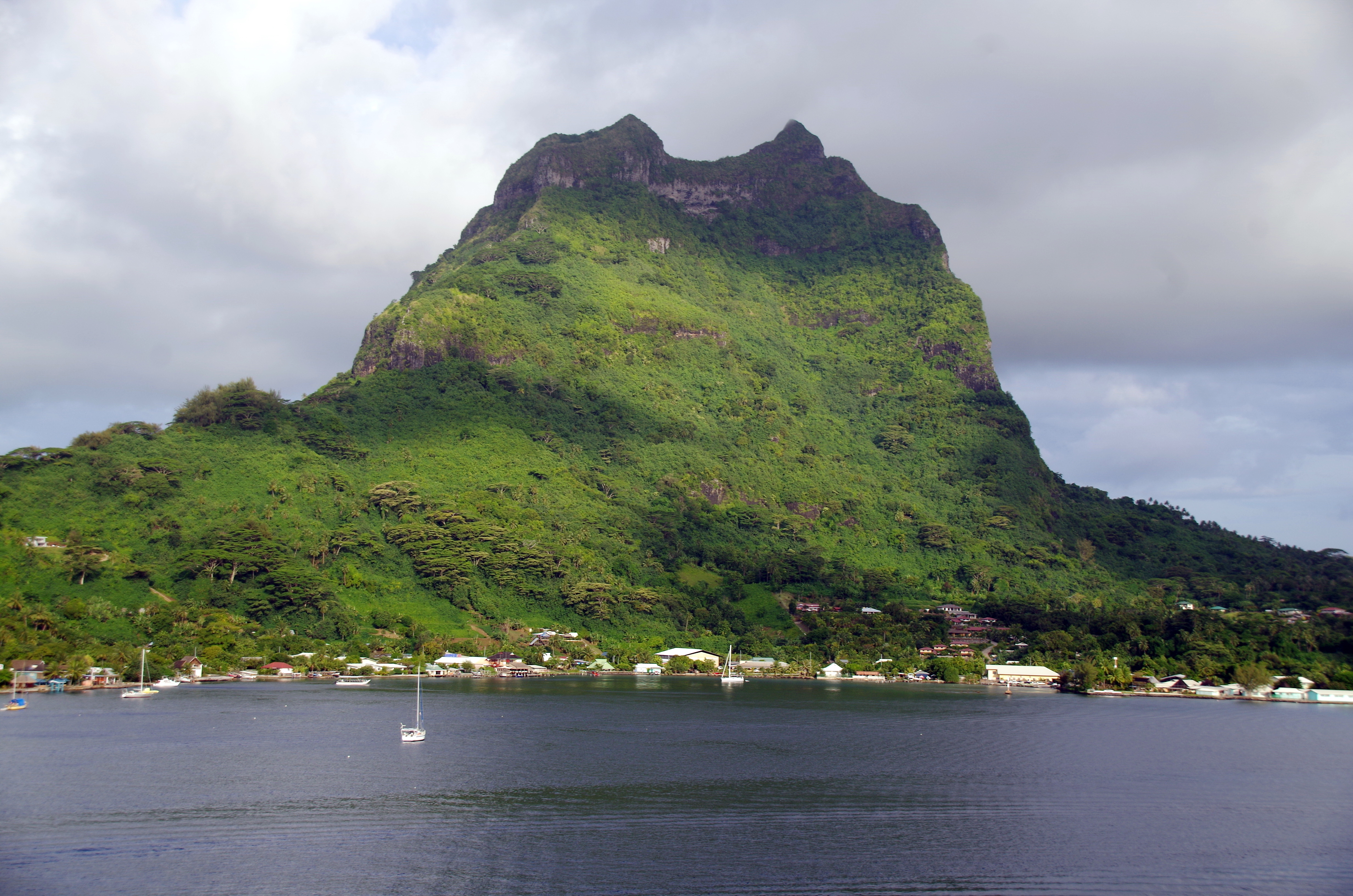
- The mountain in 2017

Highest point
- Elevation: 661 m (2,169 ft)
- Prominence: 661 m (2,169 ft)
- Coordinates: 16°29′S 151°44′W

Geography
- Location within Oceania
- Location: Central Bora Bora, French Polynesia

Mount Pahia is a mountain located on the island of Bora Bora in the South Pacific. With an elevation of 661 metres (2,169 ft) above sea level, it is the second-highest point of the island, after the neighboring Mount Otemanu. Mount Pahia is an extinct volcano forming two twin peaks. The mountain is in the center of the island next to Mount Otemanu. The city of Vaitape sits at the base of the mountain.

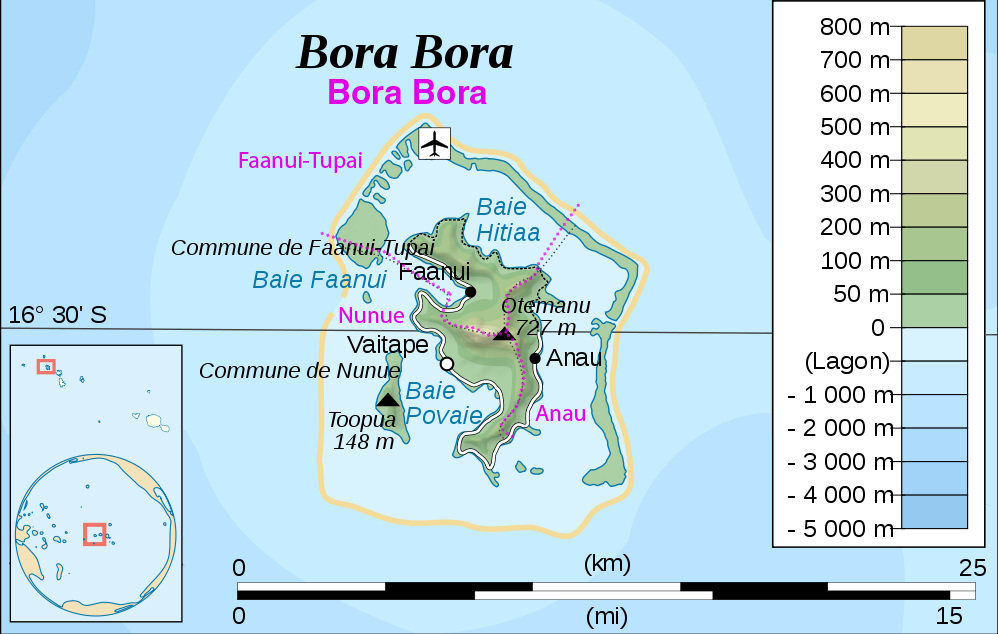
Mount Pahia is located in central Bora Bora next to Mount Otemanu

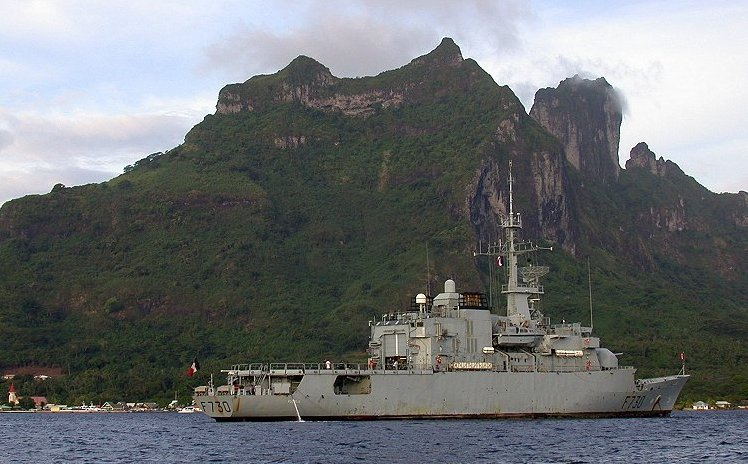
Mount Pahia next to the French frigate Floréal in November 2002

== See also ==
- List of Ultras of Oceania
