= Hotel Bora Bora =

Resort hotel in Bora Bora, French Polynesia

Coordinates: 16°32′8.28″S 151°44′47.11″W

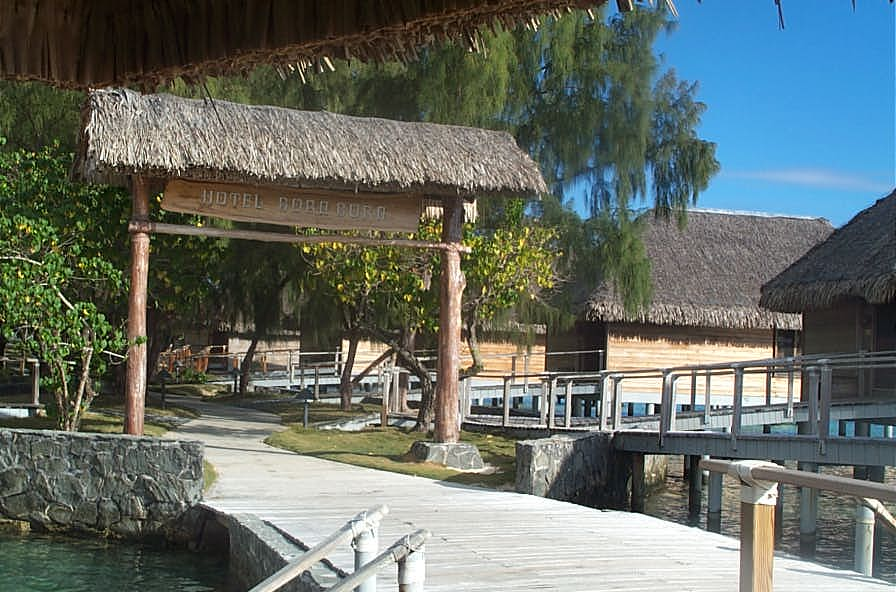
The entrance to Hotel Bora Bora

Hotel Bora Bora was a luxury hotel and resort located on the island of Bora Bora in the Society Islands in French Polynesia. It is currently a part of Aman Resorts. Hotel Bora Bora has been reviewed by Conde Nast Traveler and TripAdvisor. The hotel has over-water bungalows and suites, beach bungalows, garden bungalows with swimming pools (referred to as fare), gardens, and restaurants. The hotel was not reopened after plans for reconstruction, and remains closed.

== History ==
Hotel Bora Bora first opened in 1961 and was designed by Hammarberg and Herman. The original design featured 18 thatched-roof huts. Hotel Bora Bora closed in October 2008 for reconstruction. It was scheduled to reopen in 2011, however, it currently remains closed indefinitely. Hotel Bora Bora was the first large hotel on Bora Bora, and the first hotel to feature the over-water bungalow design concept.

== Overwater bungalows ==
The classic over-the-water bungalows were added to the hotel in 1970, nine years after its original construction. These were the first over-the-water bungalows in Bora Bora, and created a precedent for future developers. The bungalows on the water provide resort guests with a 270-degree view of the surrounding islands of Tahaa, Raiatea, Maupiti, Mootu, and Toopua, as well as a view of the barrier reef. The design of the hotel is based on the traditional Tahitian style. The 65 luxury rooms and 15 over-the-water bungalows are built on stilts in the water, facing the Bora Bora Lagoon.

== Notable guests ==
Notable guests at Hotel Bora Bora have included Robert De Niro, Robert Redford, Martin Sheen, Raquel Welch, Sharon Stone, Keanu Reeves, Pierce Brosnan, Helma Hermans, Eddie Murphy, Dan and Sharon Greany,
