= Motu Tane =

Private island in French Polynesia

Coordinates: 16.450°S 151.763°W

Tane Island
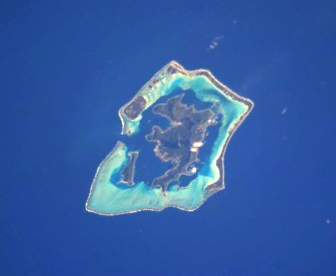
- The Bora Bora Group.
- Interactive map of Tane Island

Geography
- Location: Pacific Ocean
- Archipelago: Society Islands
- Area: 0.014 km^{2} (0.0054 sq mi)
- Highest elevation: 0 m (0 ft)

Administration
- France
- Commune: Bora Bora Commune
- Island Group: Bora Bora
- Largest settlement: Tane (pop. 23)

Demographics
- Population: 58 (2019)
- Pop. density: 0/km^{2} (0/sq mi)

Motu Tane (which in Tahitian translates as Man's Island), is a 9.6-acre (0.039 km^{2}) private island in the lagoon of Bora Bora in French Polynesia. It is located between Paahi, and Pitoraverahi.

== History ==
Motu Tane is well known in Bora Bora as having been Paul-Emile Victor's home. Paul-Emile Victor was the famous French polar explorer and author and chose as his personal paradise refuge Motu Tane in Bora Bora, to live a peaceful and secluded life.

The island has coconut groves, encircled by a white sand beach with, just beyond, Polynesia's sparkling turquoise blue waters. In 1997, it was purchased by François Nars, artistic director of the well-known cosmetic brand that he founded which carries his name. As of 2020, it is for sale.

== Administration ==
The island is part of Bora Bora Commune.

== Tourism ==
The island is up for sale

== Transportation ==
After arriving in Fa'a'ā International Airport, an Air Tahiti inter-island flight (50 minutes) will bring you to Bora Bora Airport.

There, you will need to hire a boat at the Rent-a-boat Office.
