= Ome (Bora Bora) =

Coordinates: 16.457°S 151.724°W

Ome Island
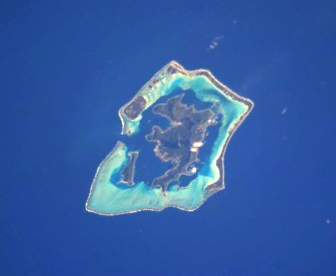
- The Bora Bora Group.
- Interactive map of Ome Island

Geography
- Location: Pacific Ocean
- Archipelago: Society Islands
- Area: 1.087 km^{2} (0.420 sq mi)
- Highest elevation: 0 m (0 ft)

Administration
- France
- Commune: Bora Bora Commune
- Island Group: Bora Bora
- Largest settlement: Tooparopae Point (pop. 15)

Demographics
- Population: 20 (2016)
- Pop. density: 18.3/km^{2} (47.4/sq mi)

Ome, is a 1.087 km^{2} (0.420 sq mi) public island in the lagoon of Bora Bora in French Polynesia. It is the located between Mute, and Temahu. Former island of Tooparopae is now adjoined to Ome in its western point.

== Administration ==
The island is part of Bora Bora Commune. the population of the island, mostly the resort staff, are working in tourism and fishing industry. On the south end of the island, some private properties of famous actors.

== Tourism ==
The island is the location of the Chez Alice resort

== Transportation ==
After arriving in Fa'a'ā International Airport, an Air Tahiti inter-island flight (50 minutes) will bring you to Bora Bora Airport.
