= Motu Tapu (Bora Bora) =

Small island in French Polynesia

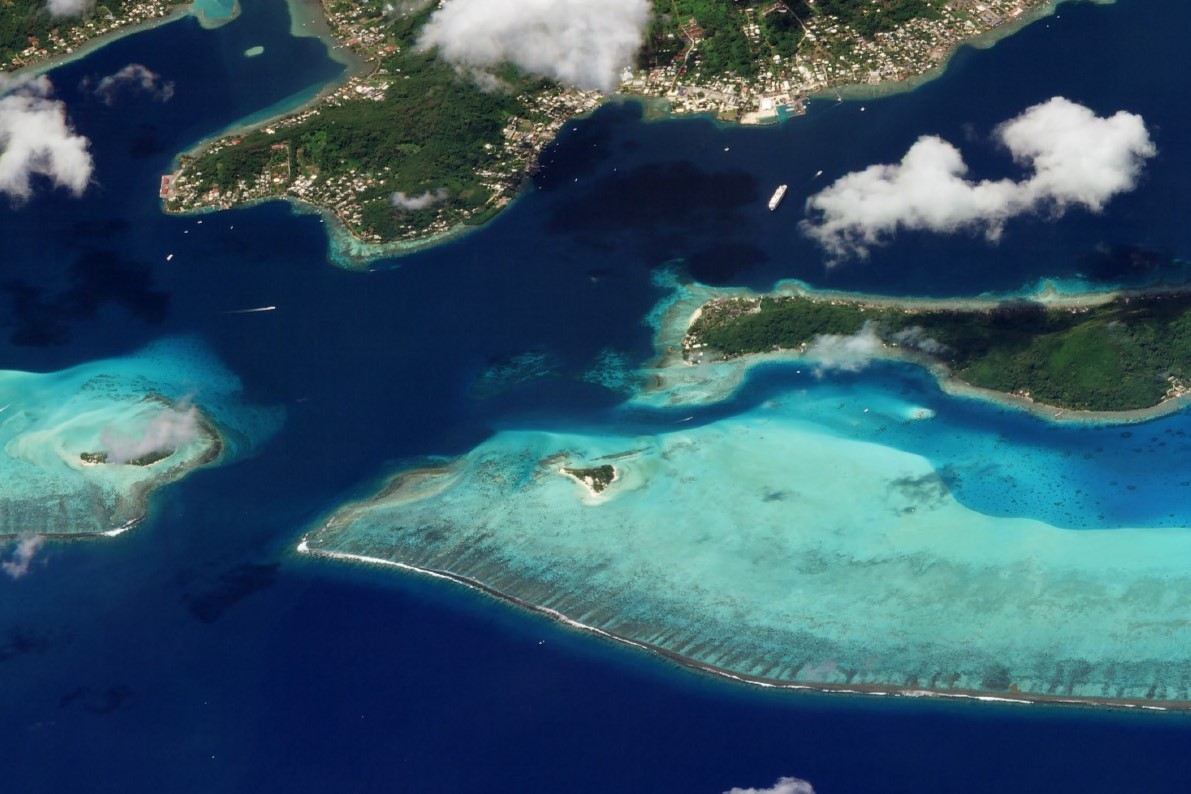
- Motu Tapu (Lower centre), Bora Bora French Polynesia

- Location within French Polynesia

Geography
- Location: Bora Bora
- Coordinates: 16°30′16.8″S 151°46′36.1″W
- Area: 0.026 km^{2} (0.010 sq mi)

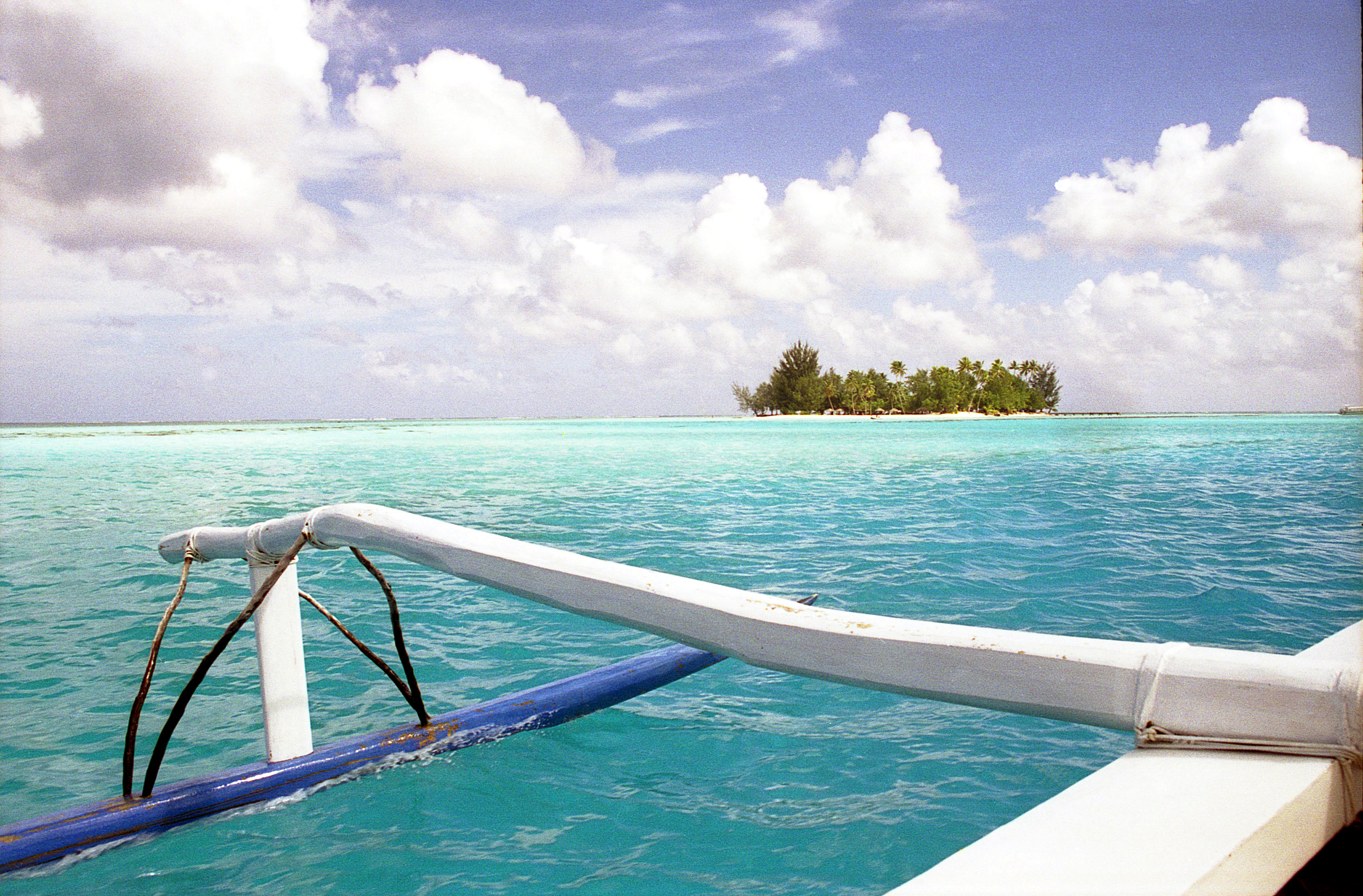
Motu Tapu Island, Bora Bora

Motu Tapu, is a 0.026-square-kilometre (0.010 sq mi) private island in the lagoon of Bora Bora in French Polynesia. It is the located betweenTo'opua and the lagoon entrance Te Ava Nui Passage.

In the 19th century, Tahitian queen Pōmare IV held Motu Tapu as her private beach.

== Etymology ==
The name "Motu Tapu" means "Sacred island" in several Polynesian languages.
