= Orobophana pacifica =

Scientific classification
- Kingdom: Animalia
- Phylum: Mollusca
- Class: Gastropoda
- Order: Cycloneritida
- Family: Helicinidae
- Genus: Orobophana
- Species: O. pacifica

Binomial name
- Orobophana pacifica (Pease, 1865)

Species of gastropod

Orobophana pacifica is a species of land snail in the family Helicinidae.
