= Four Seasons Resort Bora Bora =

Coordinates: 16.472°S 151.7073°W

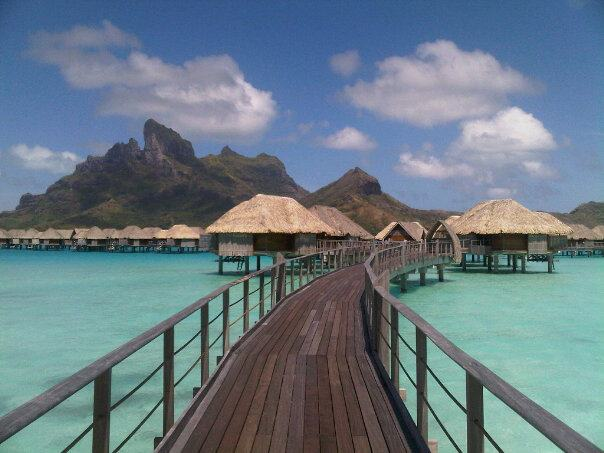
- Interactive map of the Four Seasons Resort Bora Bora area

General information
- Type: Hotel
- Location: Motu Tehotu, Bora Bora, Society Islands, French Polynesia
- Current tenants: Four Seasons Hotels and Resorts
- Opened: September 2008

Four Seasons Resort Bora Bora is a luxury resort located at Motu Tehotu on the island of Bora Bora, in the Society Islands of French Polynesia. The Resort is a part of Four Seasons Hotels and Resorts, a Toronto-based hotel management company. Four Seasons Resort Bora Bora is the company's first and only property in French Polynesia. The Resort was named the #1 Resort in French Polynesia in 2012, according to Condé Nast Traveler.

== History ==
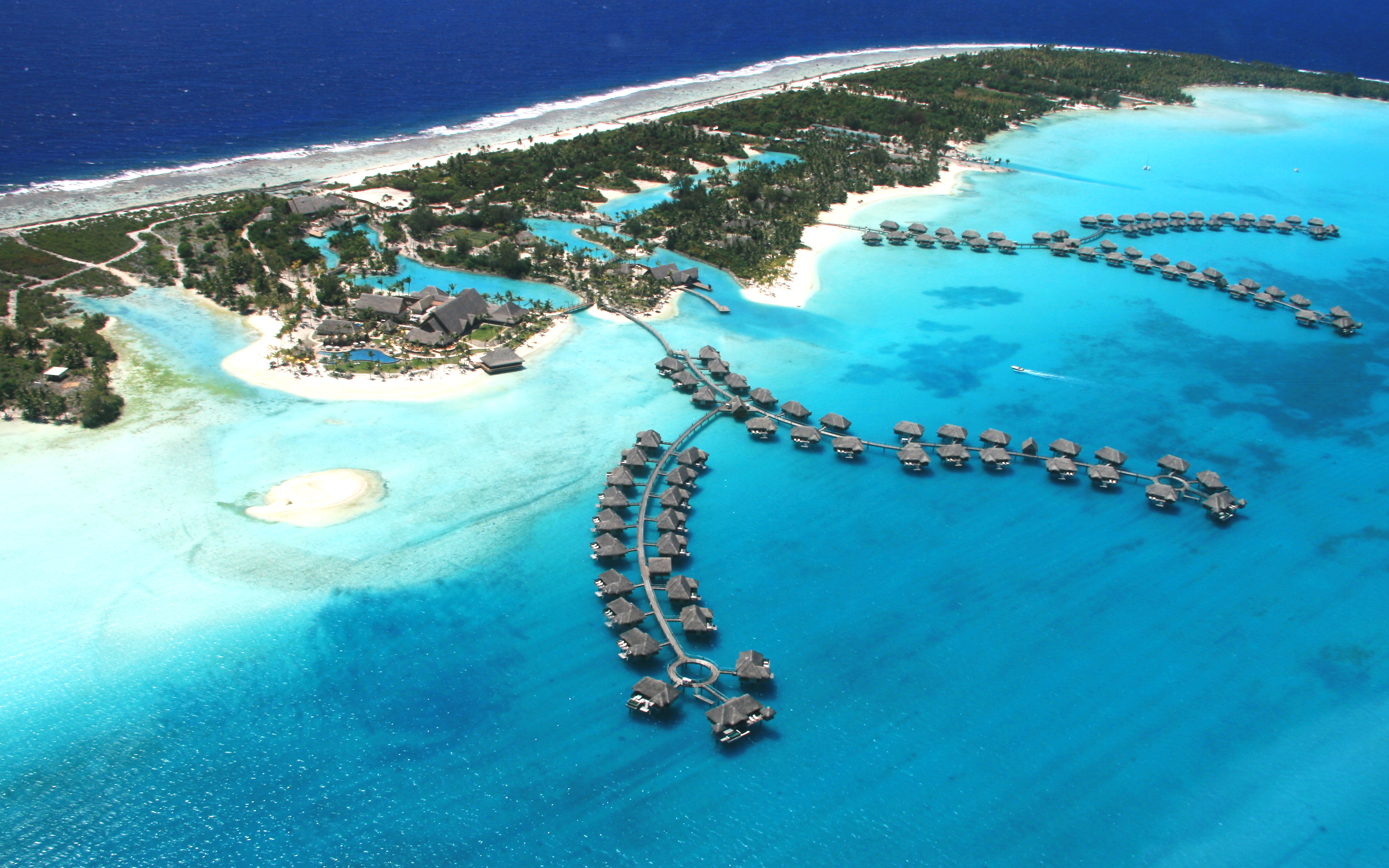
Four Seasons Resort Bora Bora

Opened in September 2008, Four Seasons Resort Bora Bora was built new by developer Thierry Barbion and designed by architects Didier Lefort and Pierre-Jean Picart, with BAMO as the interior designers. Four Seasons Resort Bora Bora consists of 100 overwater bungalows and seven beachfront villas.

== Amenities ==
The Resort offers a full-service spa, which was named the #1 Spa in French Polynesia by Condé Nast Traveller. Four restaurants, as well as watersports and Resort activities are offered. Popular with wedding and honeymoon guests, TripAdvisor named the Resort the #1 Hotel for Romance in the World.

== Lagoon Sanctuary ==
The Resort is home to the Ruahatu Lagoon Sanctuary, a research facility and home to over 100 species of marine life. A marine biologist conducts ongoing research, teaches the principles of conservation to guests on tours (Monday, Wednesday, & Friday) and grafts coral in effort to further the development of the lagoon. Marine life within the lagoon include such species as octopus, eagle ray, lizard fish, Picasso trumpet fish, soldier fish, fire fish, unicorn fish, spotted puffer fish, parrot fish, peacock damselfish, clown fish, butterfly fish, sea urchin, anemone and shrimp. The lagoon sanctuary is maintained in partnership with the Pacific Eco-World Initiative, a non-profit organization.
