= Mount Otemanu =

Highest point in Bora Bora, French Polynesia

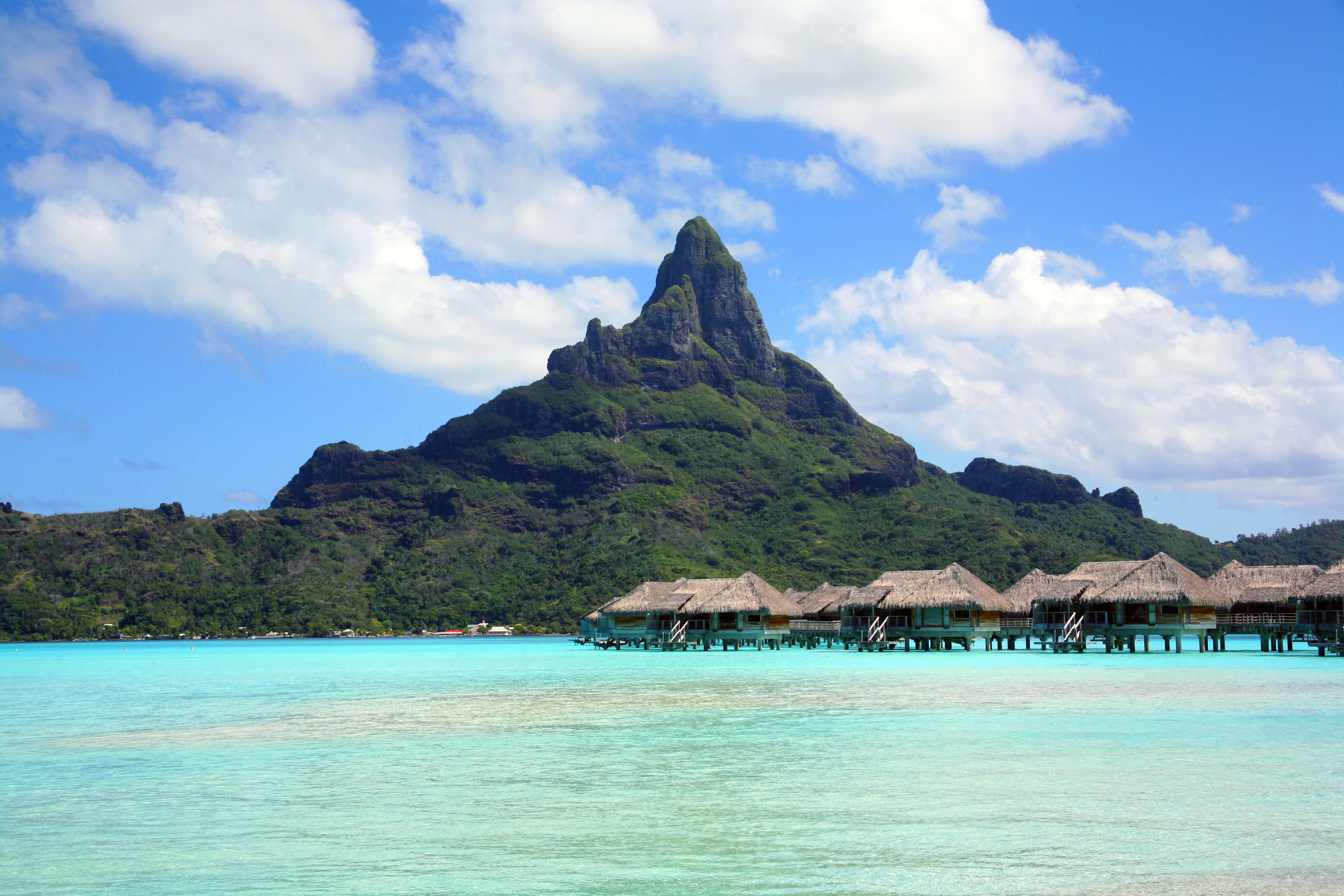
- The mountain in 2009

Highest point
- Elevation: 727 m (2,385 ft)
- Prominence: 727 m (2,385 ft)
- Coordinates: 16°30′S 151°44′W

Geography
- Location within Oceania
- Location: Central Bora Bora, French Polynesia

Mount Otemanu is a mountain located in the South Pacific, on the island of Bora Bora. With an elevation of 727 metres (2,385 ft) above sea level, it is the highest point of the island. Mount Otemanu is an extinct volcano. The mountain serves a major tourist attraction in Bora Bora for both hiking and picture-taking. The island is centered around its peak although there are no major settlements or inhabitants that occupy the mountain. It is next to the smaller Mount Pahia.

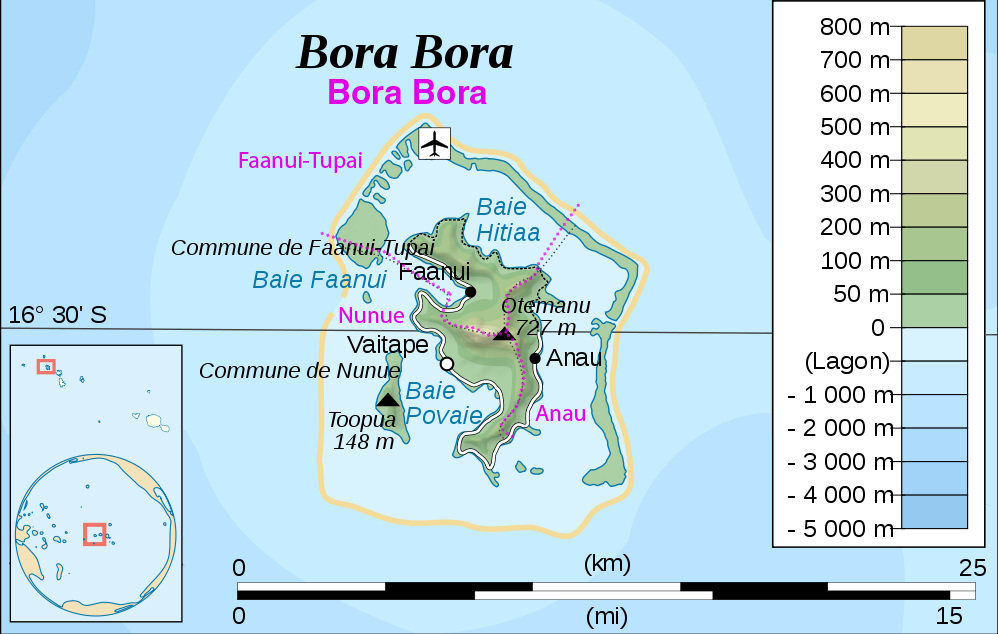
Mount Otemanu is located in central Bora Bora

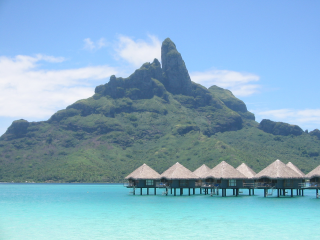
Mount Otemanu next to Four Seasons Resort Bora Bora

== See also ==
- List of Ultras of Oceania
