= Vaitape =

Largest city on Bora Bora

Coordinates: 16°30′23″S 151°44′58″W

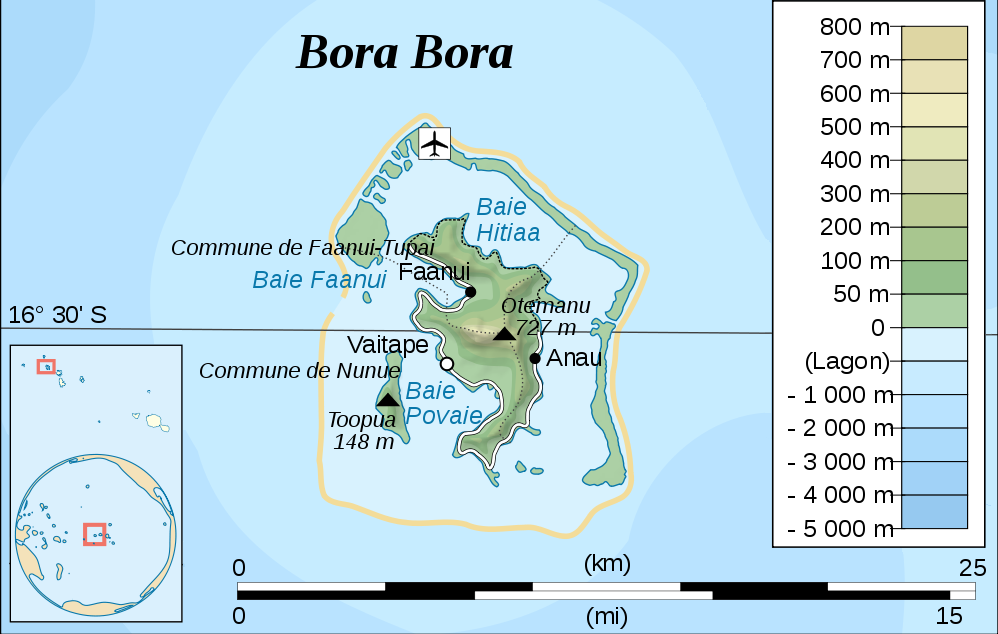
Map of Bora Bora showing the location of Vaitape

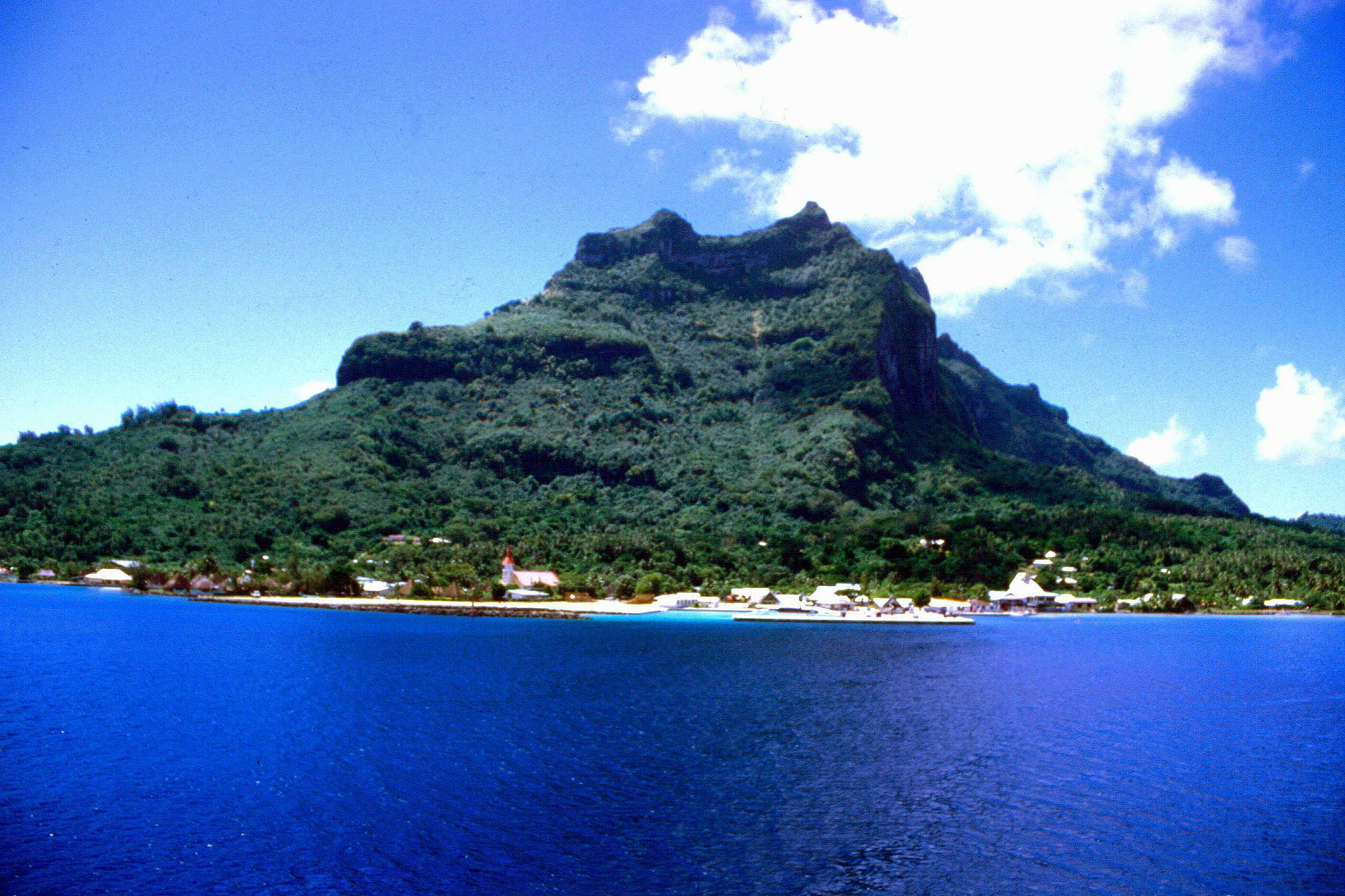
Vaitape

Vaitape is the largest city of Bora Bora Island in French Polynesia. It has a population of 4,927, about half of the island's population which is about 10,605. It is located about 210 km (130 mi) northwest of Papeete, the capital of French Polynesia. The main language of Vaitape is French, although 20 percent of the population speaks Tahitian.

== History ==
The area was first settled by early Polynesians around the 9th century. The Polynesians built grass huts and hunted fish with spears and sticks. The Tahitians lost the Franco-Tahitian War and the Leeward Islands War, leaving Tahiti and all the other islands as possessions of France. During the California Gold Rush, many people left Vaitape in search for gold. By the 1900s, the population of the area had grown significantly, and during World War II it served as a military supply base, with an oil depot, airstrip and seaplane base.

== Geography ==
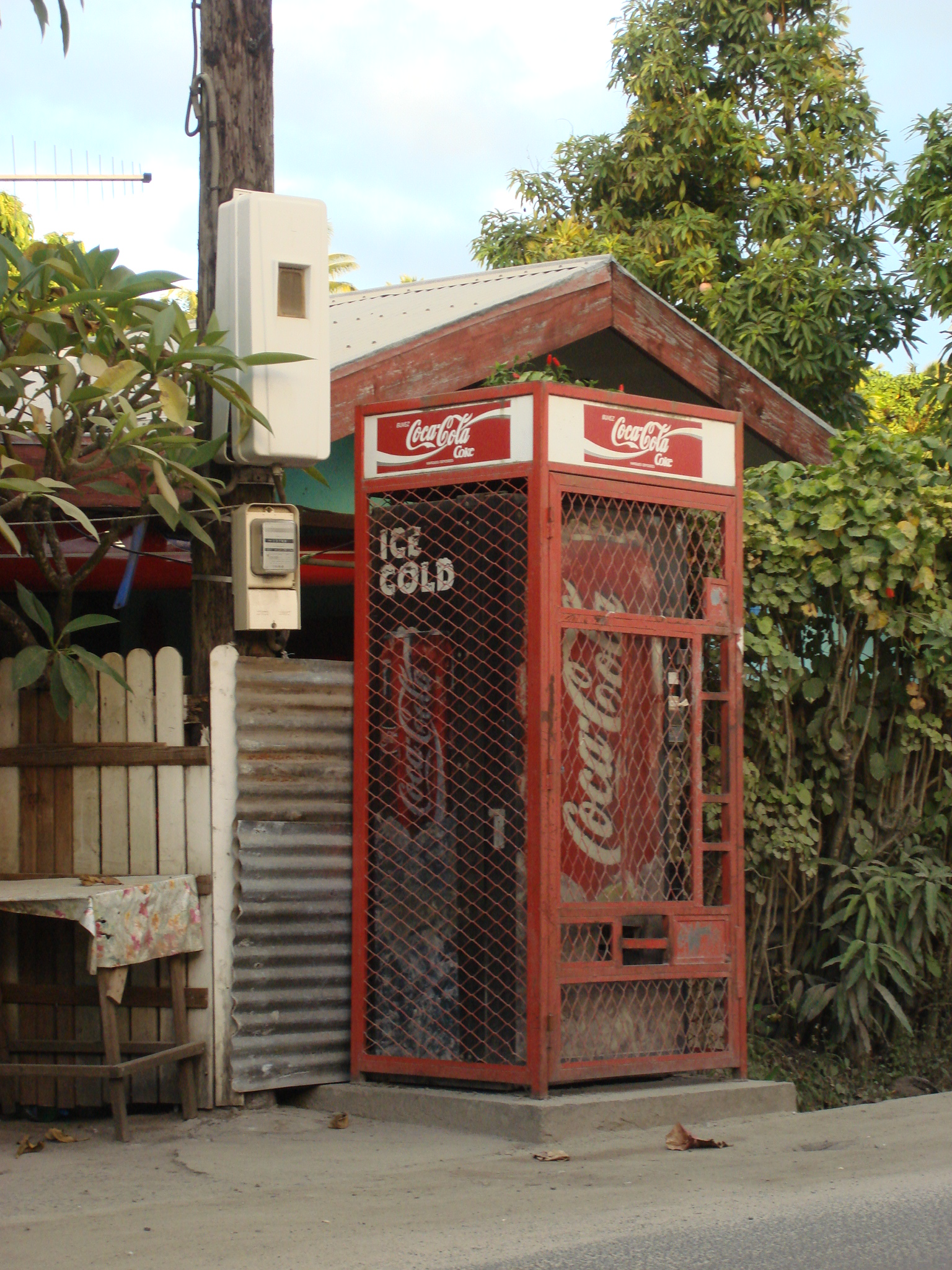
Coca-Cola Machine in coastal Vaitape

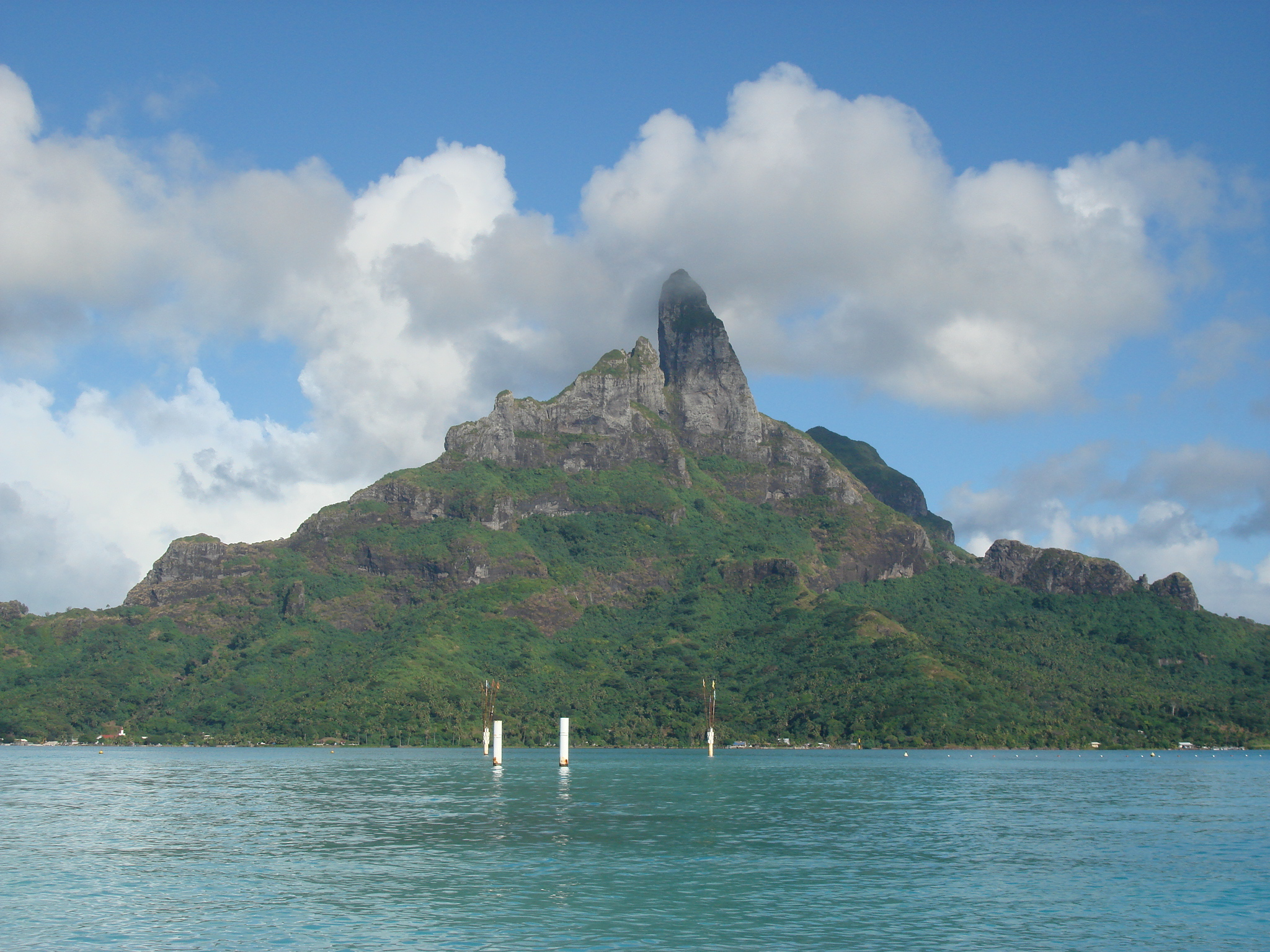
Mount Otemanu, Bora Bora

Vaitape is located on the western side of the main island of Bora Bora. It has a view of the western part of the Bora Bora lagoon. It is about 2,000 mi (3,200 km) east of Sydney, Australia. It also has a view of Bora Bora's tallest mountain, Mount Otemanu. It is surrounded with islets marking the end of the Bora Bora lagoon. The city is located about 20 ft (6.1 m) above mean sea level. Mount Pahia is another major mountain close to Vaitape.

=== Climate ===
Bora Bora has a tropical monsoon climate. Temperatures are relatively consistent throughout the year, with hot days and warm nights. The dry season lasts from June to October yet precipitation is still observed throughout this period.

Climate data for Bora-Bora
Month	Jan	Feb	Mar	Apr	May	Jun	Jul	Aug	Sep	Oct	Nov	Dec	Year
Mean daily maximum °C (°F)	30.2 (86.4)	30.8 (87.4)	30.5 (86.9)	30.3 (86.5)	29.5 (85.1)	28.5 (83.3)	28.1 (82.6)	28.1 (82.6)	28.6 (83.5)	29.1 (84.4)	29.4 (84.9)	29.6 (85.3)	29.4 (84.9)
Mean daily minimum °C (°F)	25.1 (77.2)	25.3 (77.5)	25.5 (77.9)	25.5 (77.9)	25.2 (77.4)	24.2 (75.6)	23.8 (74.8)	23.8 (74.8)	24.0 (75.2)	24.3 (75.7)	24.6 (76.3)	24.8 (76.6)	24.7 (76.5)
Average rainfall mm (inches)	268.7 (10.58)	233.2 (9.18)	176.9 (6.96)	182.7 (7.19)	129.8 (5.11)	98.2 (3.87)	83.3 (3.28)	59.7 (2.35)	65.5 (2.58)	99.8 (3.93)	203.7 (8.02)	280.6 (11.05)	1,882.1 (74.10)
Mean monthly sunshine hours	201.1	202.6	239.4	219.8	224.1	224.5	231.8	248.4	241.0	230.5	217.7	207.0	2,687.9
Source: NOAA

Most rainfall occurs during the winter months (November to April) and is accompanied by high humidity.

== Transportation ==
Bora Bora Airport is an airport outside Vaitape on Motu Mute on the northern part of Bora Bora. Small boats leave the mainland and go across the Bora Bora Lagoon. Several ferries leave Bora Bora and sail to Tahiti and Moorea. Some of these ferries are the Aremeti ferry and the Moorea ferry. Uturoa has a few ferries coming into Vaitape.

=== Air ===
Bora Bora Airport serves the island of Bora Bora. The airport serves as a stopover en route for other destinations in French Polynesia. Although the airport is regularly used by private jets bringing guests to the island, Air Tahiti and Air Moana are the only regular airlines available to the general public. If residents want to make an international flight, they would have to take Air Tahiti or Air Moana to Faa'a International Airport, which is located in Faaa, Tahiti, and is the only airport in French Polynesia that serves international flights.

=== Sea ===
Bora Bora is one of the main stops for cruise ships departing from Papeete. Smaller boats can be rented for tours to discover Bora Bora's islets and go snorkelling among the coral reef. Small ferries transport passengers from the airport to Vaitape and luxury hotels around the island. A ferry departs several times a week from Vaitape for the islands of Tahaa and Raiatea.

=== Road ===
Bora Bora's main road runs through Vaitape. The maximum speed limit is 60km/h in limited stretches of the island. There is no freeway in Bora Bora.

== Economy ==
There are a few supermarkets located in the city which sell common items such as fish, fruit, vegetables, bread, canned foods, general grocery items but also tools, toys, light furniture and white goods. Fruits include mangoes, breadfruits, pineapples, papayas and various sorts of bananas.
