= Bora-Bora (commune) =

Place in French Polynesia, France

- Flag

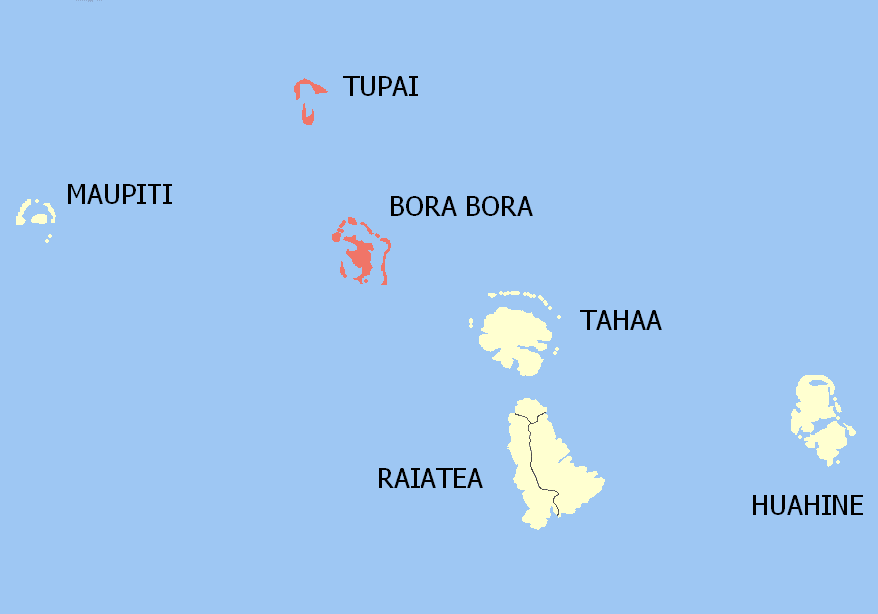
- Location of the commune (in red) within the Leeward Islands
- Location of Bora-Bora
- Coordinates: 16°29′40″S 151°44′11″W
- Country: France
- Overseas collectivity: French Polynesia
- Subdivision: Leeward Islands

Government
  - Mayor (2020–2026): Gaston Tong Sang
- Area^{1}: 41.55 km^{2} (16.04 sq mi)
- Highest elevation: 727 m (2,385 ft)
- Lowest elevation: 0 m (0 ft)
- Population (2022): 10,758
  - Density: 258.9/km^{2} (670.6/sq mi)
- Time zone: UTC−10:00
- INSEE/Postal code: 98714 /98730
- ^{1} French Land Register data, which excludes lakes, ponds, glaciers > 1 km^{2} (0.386 sq mi or 247 acres) and river estuaries.

Bora-Bora (Tahitian: Pora Pora) is a commune of French Polynesia, an overseas territory of France in the Pacific Ocean. The commune is in the administrative subdivision of the Leeward Islands. Its population was 10,758 at the 2022 census.

The commune of Bora-Bora is made up of the island of Bora Bora proper with its surrounding islets emerging from the coral reef (30.55 km^{2}/11.3 sq. miles in total) and of the atoll of Tupai (11 km^{2} (4.2 sq mi)), located 20 kilometres (12 mi) north of Bora Bora. The atoll of Tupai has no permanent population apart from some seasonal workers in the coconut plantations.

The surrounding islets include Motu Tapu, Motu Ahuna, Tevairoa, Motu Tane, Motu Mute, Motu Tufari, Motu Tehotu, Motu Pitiaau, Sofitel Motu, Motu Toopua, and Toopuaiti.

== Climate ==
Bora-Bora has a tropical monsoon climate (Köppen climate classification Am). The average annual temperature in Bora-Bora is 27.6 °C (81.7 °F). The average annual rainfall is 1,654.1 mm (65.12 in) with December as the wettest month. The temperatures are highest on average in March, at around 28.6 °C (83.5 °F), and lowest in August, at around 26.4 °C (79.5 °F). The highest temperature ever recorded in Bora-Bora was 35.9 °C (96.6 °F) on 11 November 1996; the coldest temperature ever recorded was 17.8 °C (64.0 °F) on 10 July 1983.

Climate data for Bora-Bora (Bora Bora Airport, 1991−2020 normals, extremes 1976−present)
Month	Jan	Feb	Mar	Apr	May	Jun	Jul	Aug	Sep	Oct	Nov	Dec	Year
Record high °C (°F)	35.6 (96.1)	35.5 (95.9)	35.5 (95.9)	34.3 (93.7)	33.5 (92.3)	33.4 (92.1)	32.2 (90.0)	33.2 (91.8)	34.0 (93.2)	33.9 (93.0)	35.9 (96.6)	34.7 (94.5)	35.9 (96.6)
Mean daily maximum °C (°F)	31.1 (88.0)	31.1 (88.0)	31.4 (88.5)	31.1 (88.0)	30.2 (86.4)	29.3 (84.7)	28.9 (84.0)	29.0 (84.2)	29.4 (84.9)	29.9 (85.8)	30.7 (87.3)	30.8 (87.4)	30.2 (86.4)
Daily mean °C (°F)	28.2 (82.8)	28.3 (82.9)	28.6 (83.5)	28.4 (83.1)	27.7 (81.9)	26.9 (80.4)	26.5 (79.7)	26.4 (79.5)	26.7 (80.1)	27.2 (81.0)	27.9 (82.2)	28.0 (82.4)	27.6 (81.7)
Mean daily minimum °C (°F)	25.3 (77.5)	25.4 (77.7)	25.8 (78.4)	25.8 (78.4)	25.2 (77.4)	24.5 (76.1)	24.1 (75.4)	23.9 (75.0)	24.0 (75.2)	24.5 (76.1)	25.0 (77.0)	25.2 (77.4)	24.9 (76.8)
Record low °C (°F)	21.1 (70.0)	20.7 (69.3)	21.3 (70.3)	20.7 (69.3)	19.9 (67.8)	19.5 (67.1)	17.8 (64.0)	19.3 (66.7)	19.2 (66.6)	20.0 (68.0)	20.1 (68.2)	21.0 (69.8)	17.8 (64.0)
Average rainfall mm (inches)	245.0 (9.65)	211.5 (8.33)	168.1 (6.62)	143.9 (5.67)	112.0 (4.41)	85.5 (3.37)	61.9 (2.44)	63.7 (2.51)	64.6 (2.54)	108.7 (4.28)	138.5 (5.45)	250.7 (9.87)	1,654.1 (65.12)
Average precipitation days (≥ 1.0 mm)	17.2	15.3	14.5	11.8	11.4	9.7	9.4	8.8	9.3	10.6	12.3	16.8	147.1
Mean monthly sunshine hours	201.1	202.6	239.4	219.8	224.1	224.5	231.8	248.4	241.0	230.5	217.7	207.0	2,687.9
Source 1: Météo-France
Source 2: NOAA (sun 1961-1990)

== Administration ==
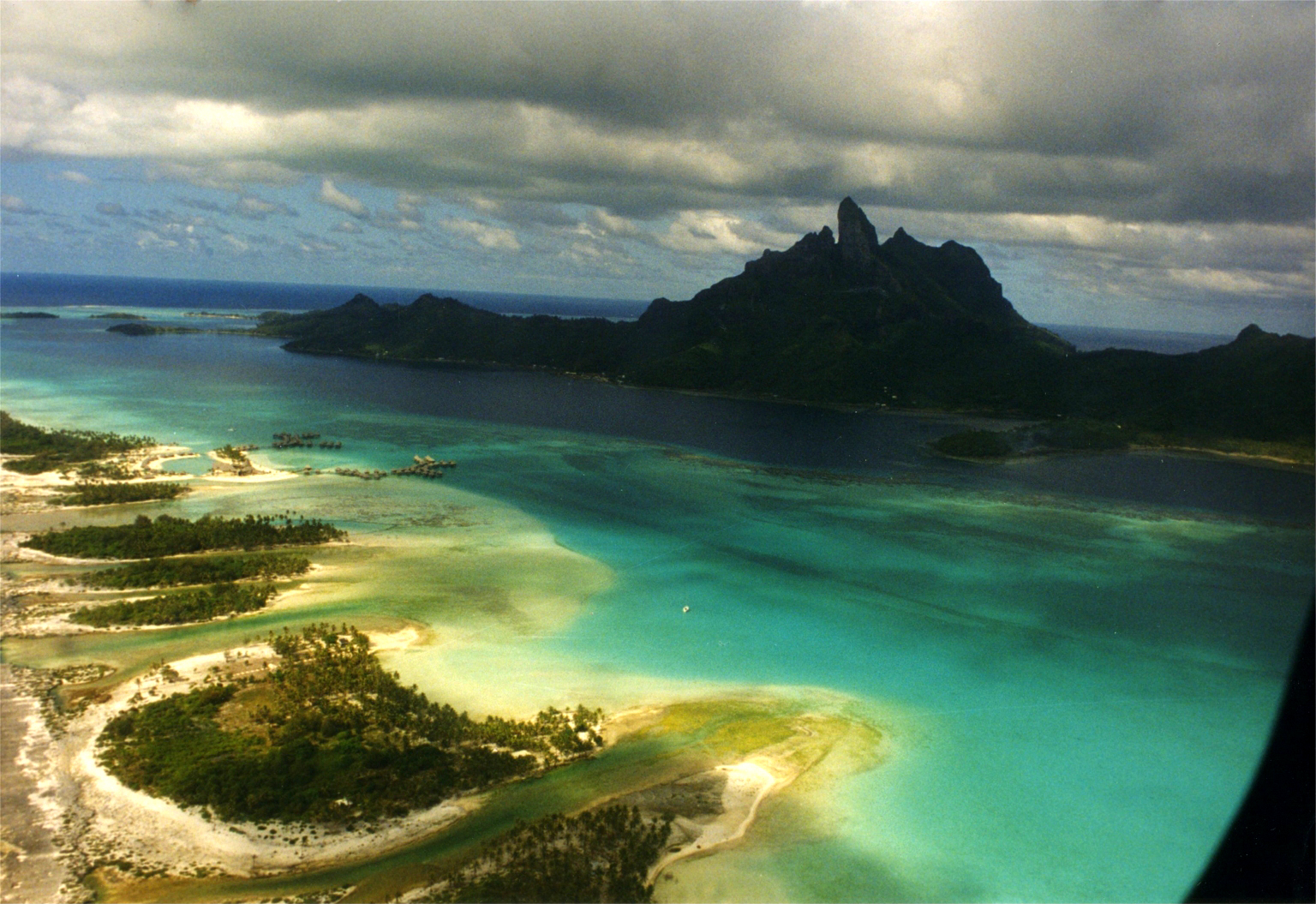
Bora-Bora from air

The commune is in the administrative subdivision of the Leeward Islands and consists of the following associated communes:

- Anau
- Faanui
- Nunue

The administrative center of the commune is the settlement of Vaitape, on the island of Bora Bora. Gaston Tong Sang is the current mayor of Bora Bora.
