= Bora Bora =

Island in French Polynesia

Native name: Pora Pora
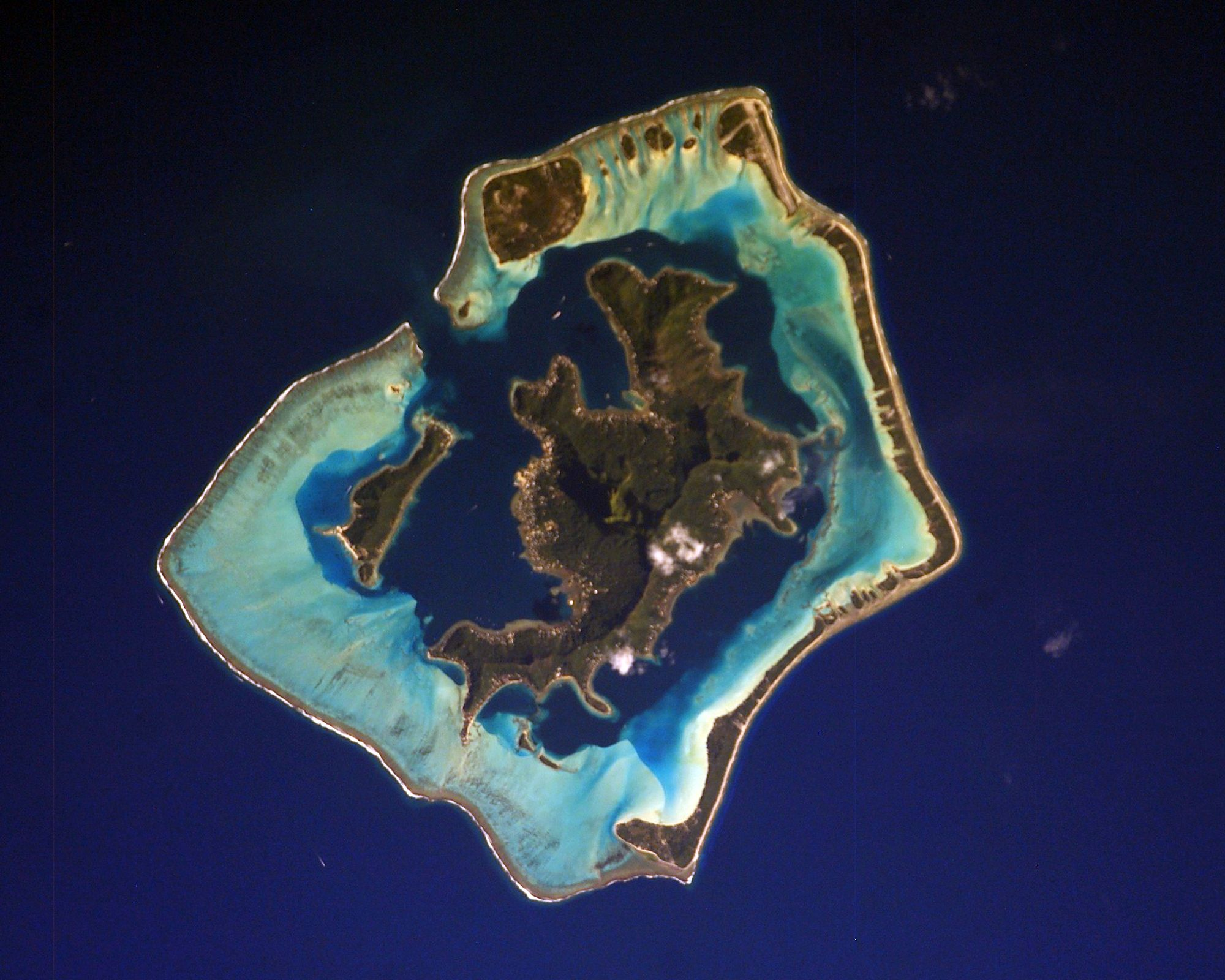
- Bora Bora and its lagoon seen from the International Space Station

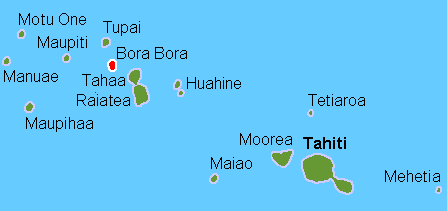
- Location of Bora Bora in the Society Islands

Geography
- Coordinates: 16°30′04″S 151°44′24″W
- Archipelago: Society Islands
- Area: 30.55 km^{2} (11.80 sq mi)
- Highest elevation: 727 m (2385 ft)
- Highest point: Mount Otemanu

Administration
- France
- Overseas collectivity: French Polynesia, France
- Administrative subdivision: Leeward Islands
- Commune: Bora-Bora
- Largest settlement: Vaitape

Demographics
- Population: 10,605 (2017)
- Pop. density: 347/km^{2} (899/sq mi)

Bora Bora (French: Bora-Bora; Tahitian: Pora Pora) is a French island group in the Leeward Islands, comprising the western part of the Society Islands of French Polynesia, an overseas collectivity of the French Republic in the South Pacific. Bora Bora has a total land area of 30.55 km^{2} (12 sq mi). The main island, located about 230 kilometres (125 nautical miles) northwest of Papeete, is surrounded by a lagoon and a barrier reef. In the center of the island are the remnants of an extinct volcano, rising to two peaks, Mount Pahia and Mount Otemanu; the highest point is at 727 m (2,385 ft).

Bora Bora is part of the commune of Bora-Bora, which also includes the atoll of Tupai (or Tūpai). The main languages spoken in Bora Bora are Tahitian and French. However, owing to significant tourist movement, many natives of Bora Bora have learned to speak English.

Bora Bora is a major international tourist destination, featuring seaside (and some offshore) luxury resorts. Its major settlement, Vaitape, is on the western side of the main island, opposite the main channel leading into the lagoon. Produce on the island is mostly limited to what can be obtained from the sea and from the plentiful coconut trees, which were historically of economic importance for the production of copra.

== Name ==
In ancient times, the island was called Porapora mai te pora "created by the gods" in the local Tahitian language, often abbreviated as Porapora "first born". The phonemes [p] and [b] are allophonic to the Tahitian ear or lies between the two while ⟨r⟩ similar in sound to [l] and [ɹ̠] but English, French, or Dutch speakers limitedly perceive them Bola Bola or Bora Bora. When Dutch explorer Jacob Roggeveen first landed on the island, he and his crew adopted the name Bora Bora, which has stood in Western cartography ever since.

== History ==
Flag of the Kingdom of Bora Bora (1837–1842)

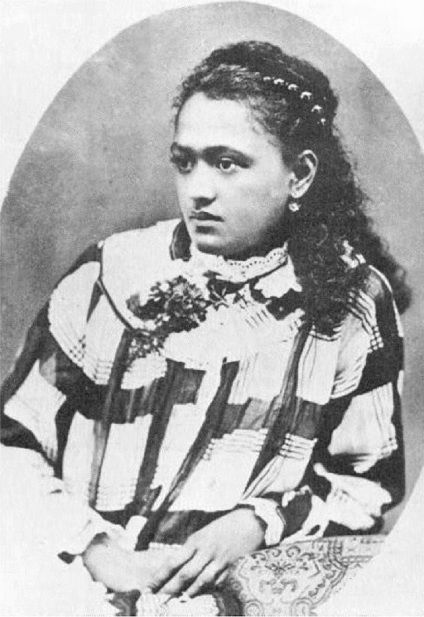
Teriimaevarua III, last Queen of Bora Bora

The island was inhabited by Polynesian settlers around the 3rd century CE. The first European sighting was made by Jacob Roggeveen in 1722.

James Cook sighted the island on 29 July 1769, with the help of a Tahitian navigator, Tupaia. The London Missionary Society arrived in 1820 and founded a Protestant church in 1890. Bora Bora was an independent kingdom until 1888, when the French annexed the island as a colony and forced its last queen, Teriimaevarua III, to abdicate.

=== World War II ===
During World War II, the United States chose Bora Bora as a South Pacific military supply base and constructed an oil depot, an airstrip, a seaplane base, and defensive fortifications. The expedition, known as "Operation Bobcat", comprised nine ships, 18,000 t (18,000 long tons; 20,000 short tons) of equipment, and nearly 7,000 soldiers.

At least eight 7-inch/44-caliber guns were operated by some members of the 13th Coast Artillery Regiment (later renamed the 276th Coast Artillery Battalion). The guns were set up at strategic points around the island to protect it against a potential military attack. All eight of these guns remain in the area to this day.

However, the island saw no combat. The American presence on Bora Bora went uncontested for the entire course of the war. The base was officially closed on 2 June 1946. The World War II airstrip was never enlarged to accommodate large aircraft, but it was nonetheless French Polynesia's only international airport until 1960, when Faa'a International Airport opened next to Papeete, Tahiti.

== Geography ==
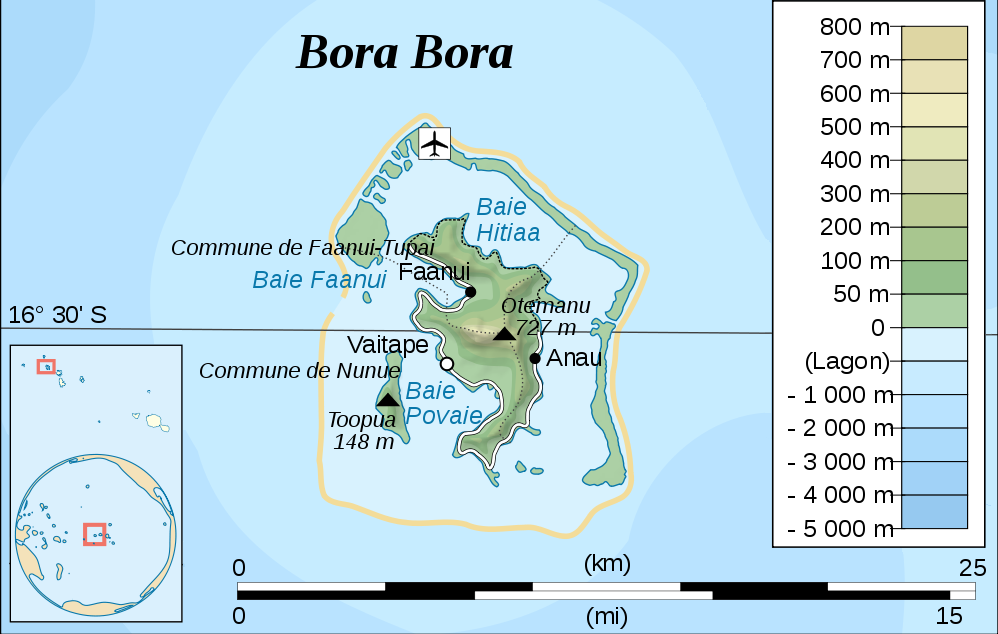
Enlargeable, detailed map of Bora Bora

Bora Bora is located in the Society Islands, which are part of French Polynesia, and is located northwest of Tahiti, about 260 km (162 mi) northwest of Papeete, Tahiti. It also has around it several motus (Motu is a Tahitian word meaning "small island"), which are small elongated islets that usually have some width and vegetation. One of the most beautiful and photographed motus in Polynesia is Motu Tapu, to the west of the main island, especially before a hurricane carried away part of the tongues of sand at its ends.

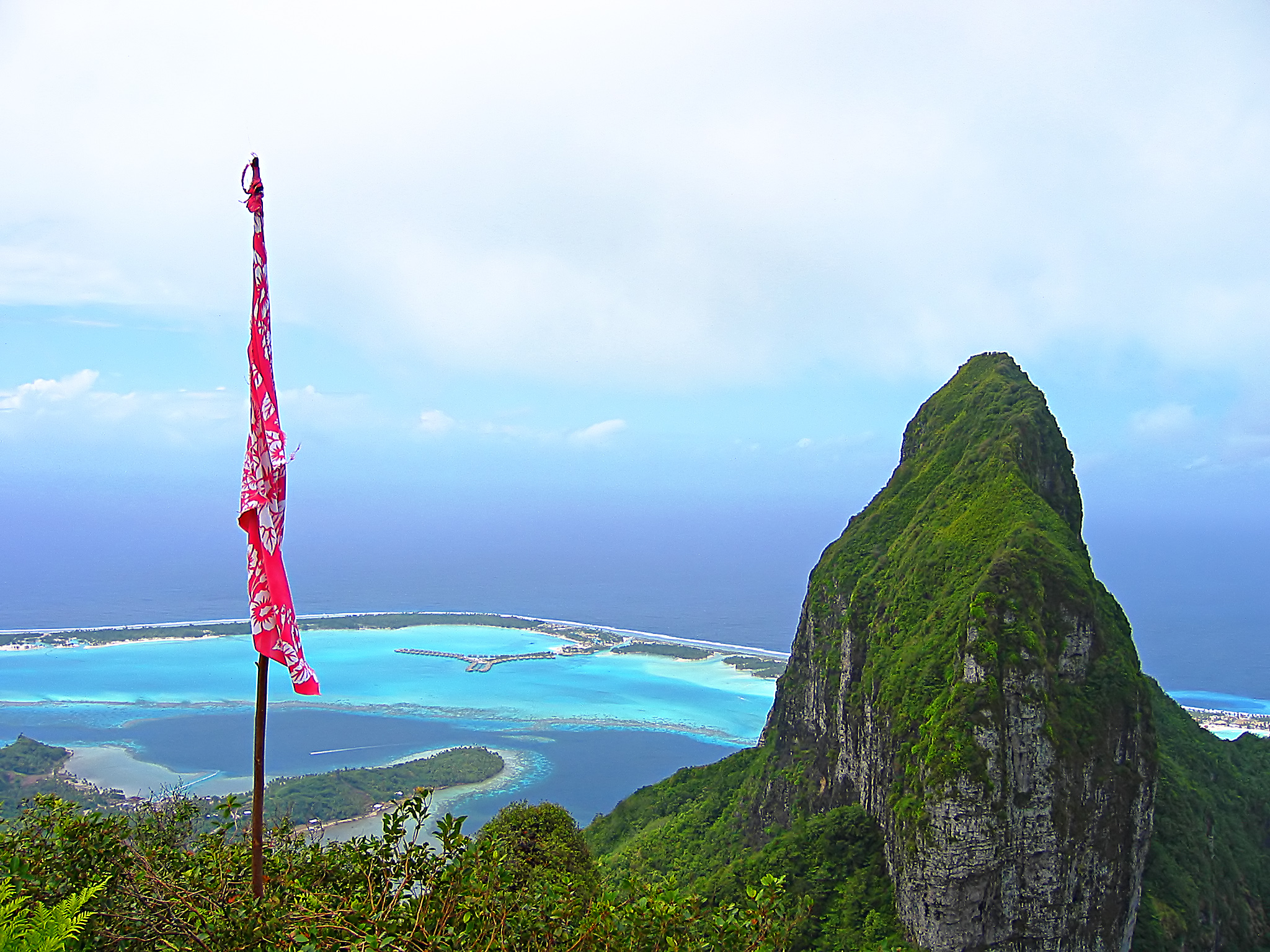
Mount Otemanu, Bora Bora

=== Dimensions ===
Bora Bora is among the smaller of the islands of the Society archipelago: the main island measures only 8 km (5 mi) from north to south and 5 km (3 mi) east to west; the total area of Bora Bora, including islets, is less than 39 km^{2} (15 sq mi). Bora Bora is an area of 29.3 km^{2} (11.3 sq mi) mountainous central island, which is an extinct volcano, itself surrounded by a lagoon separated from the sea by a reef. The highest point is Mount Otemanu, at 727 m (2,385 ft).

=== Description ===
Bora Bora is formed by an extinct volcano, surrounded by a lagoon and a fringing reef. Its summit is Mount Otemanu, located in the center of the atoll; another summit, Mount Pahia, on the main island is 661 m (2,169 ft) high.

The main island has four open bays overlooking the lagoon: Faanui Bay, Tuuraapuo Bay and Povai Bay to the west, and Hitiaa Bay to the northwest. Tuuraapuo Bay separates the main island from two islets of volcanic nature: Toopua and Toopua-iti.

Necklace-shaped coral reefs surround the central island and protect it from the open sea as if it were a dike. It is a barrier reef with only one opening to the ocean: the Teavanui Passage, located west of the main island, which allows most large cargo ships and cruise ships to enter the lagoon.

They must, however, stay in the channel, as much of the lagoon water is shallow outside the Teavanui Passage. The barrier reef is very wide in some sections, where it exceeds two kilometers in width to the southwest of the island. To the east and north of the island, the reef supports a series of islets made up of coral ruins and sand (the motu). One such motu in the north, the Motu Mute, is where the U.S. Army built an air base during the Second World War, which has now become the airport of Bora Bora.

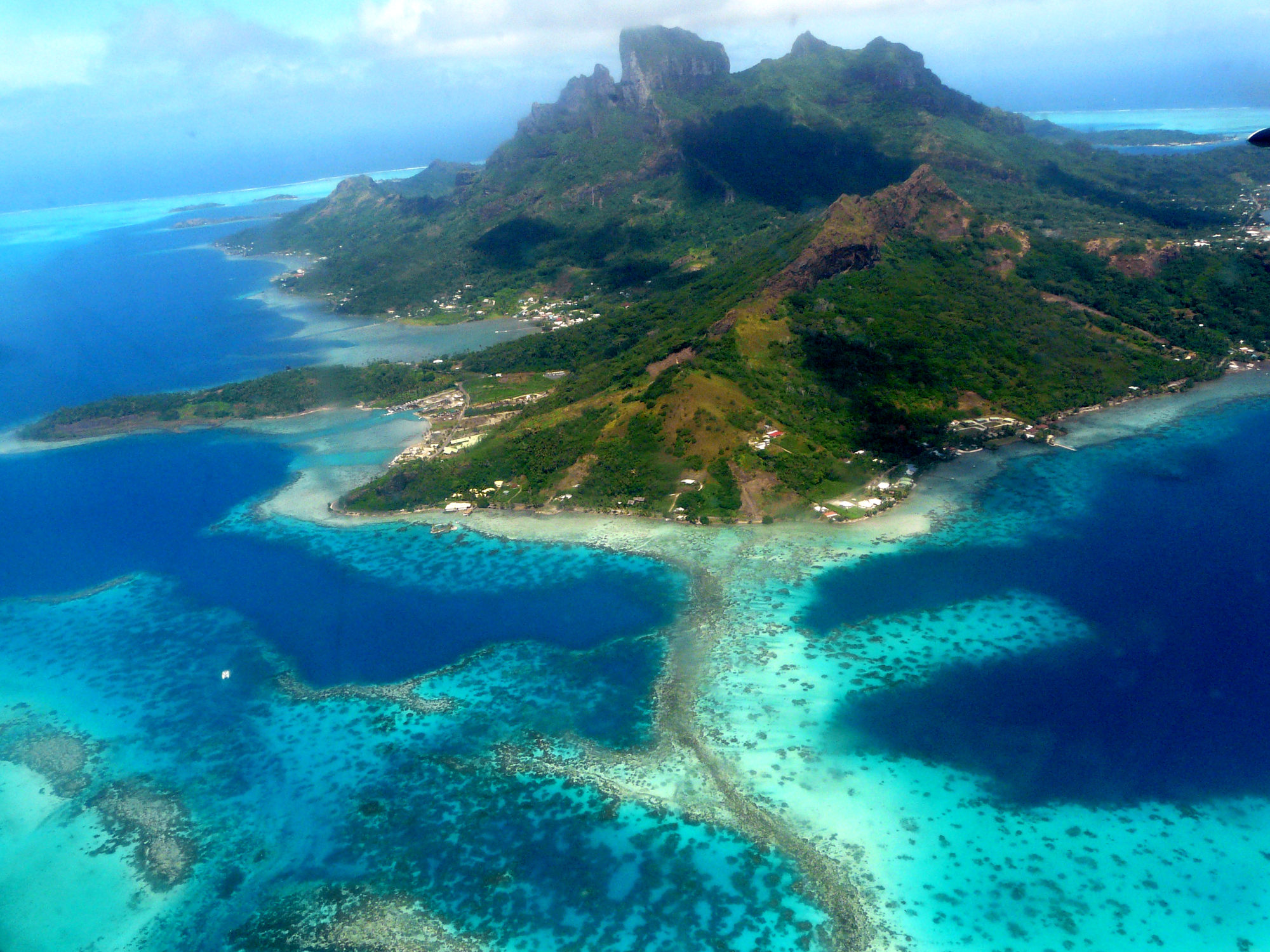
Aerial view of the island

The lagoon, abundant in fish, is remarkable for its breadth and beauty. Its color varies with depth: dark indigo when it is deep (Teavanui Passage, Poofai and Faanui bays) and pastel shades of blue and green elsewhere. Corals, when they are very close to the surface, along with the fauna that colonizes them, come to wear a wide variety of colors: egg yolk, red, blue or purple.

=== Geology ===
Bora Bora is part of a group of volcanic islands linked to the activity of a hazardous area. It is an extinct volcano which was active in the Upper Pliocene (between 3.45 and 3.10 million years ago), and then underwent at least partial depression and strong erosion under a hot and humid tropical climate.

The bay of Tuuraapuo was the main crater of the volcano, whose collapsed southwestern edge only subsists still in the islets Toopua and Toopua-iti, which culminate respectively at 148 m (486 ft) and 17 m (56 ft), altitude. The volcanic rocks are of basaltic type, consisting mostly of alkaline basalts, some hawaiites, and some gabbro intrusions, especially on the islet Toopua. They come mostly from voids, with explosive episodes being rare.

=== Climate ===
Bora Bora has a tropical monsoon climate. Temperatures are relatively consistent throughout the year, with hot days and warm nights. The dry season lasts from June to October, but there is some precipitation even during those months.

Climate data for Bora Bora (Bora Bora Airport, 1991−2020 normals, extremes 1976−present)
Month	Jan	Feb	Mar	Apr	May	Jun	Jul	Aug	Sep	Oct	Nov	Dec	Year
Record high °C (°F)	35.6 (96.1)	35.5 (95.9)	35.5 (95.9)	34.3 (93.7)	33.5 (92.3)	33.4 (92.1)	32.2 (90.0)	33.2 (91.8)	34.0 (93.2)	33.9 (93.0)	35.9 (96.6)	34.7 (94.5)	35.9 (96.6)
Mean daily maximum °C (°F)	31.1 (88.0)	31.1 (88.0)	31.4 (88.5)	31.1 (88.0)	30.2 (86.4)	29.3 (84.7)	28.9 (84.0)	29.0 (84.2)	29.4 (84.9)	29.9 (85.8)	30.7 (87.3)	30.8 (87.4)	30.2 (86.4)
Daily mean °C (°F)	28.2 (82.8)	28.3 (82.9)	28.6 (83.5)	28.4 (83.1)	27.7 (81.9)	26.9 (80.4)	26.5 (79.7)	26.4 (79.5)	26.7 (80.1)	27.2 (81.0)	27.9 (82.2)	28.0 (82.4)	27.6 (81.7)
Mean daily minimum °C (°F)	25.3 (77.5)	25.4 (77.7)	25.8 (78.4)	25.8 (78.4)	25.2 (77.4)	24.5 (76.1)	24.1 (75.4)	23.9 (75.0)	24.0 (75.2)	24.5 (76.1)	25.0 (77.0)	25.2 (77.4)	24.9 (76.8)
Record low °C (°F)	21.1 (70.0)	20.7 (69.3)	21.3 (70.3)	20.7 (69.3)	19.9 (67.8)	19.5 (67.1)	17.8 (64.0)	19.3 (66.7)	19.2 (66.6)	20.0 (68.0)	20.1 (68.2)	21.0 (69.8)	17.8 (64.0)
Average rainfall mm (inches)	245.0 (9.65)	211.5 (8.33)	168.1 (6.62)	143.9 (5.67)	112.0 (4.41)	85.5 (3.37)	61.9 (2.44)	63.7 (2.51)	64.6 (2.54)	108.7 (4.28)	138.5 (5.45)	250.7 (9.87)	1,654.1 (65.12)
Average precipitation days (≥ 1.0 mm)	17.2	15.3	14.5	11.8	11.4	9.7	9.4	8.8	9.3	10.6	12.3	16.8	147.1
Mean monthly sunshine hours	201.1	202.6	239.4	219.8	224.1	224.5	231.8	248.4	241.0	230.5	217.7	207.0	2,687.9
Source 1: Météo-France
Source 2: NOAA (sun 1961–1990)

The rainy season is between November and April, with a heavy atmosphere and sometimes violent storms resulting in heavy rains. These rains can last several days, but this does not preclude many sunny days during the wet season. The humidity level usually ranges from 75% to 90%, sometimes reaching 100%. The dry season is between April and October, with warm and fairly dry weather, but the trade winds sometimes blow strongly. The days are still sunny, but although the dry season is present, this does not prevent the occurrence of some showers or even thunderstorms in the afternoon.

During the dry season, the average humidity level remains between 45 and 60%; sometimes, this level rises spontaneously to 80%, especially at night when the ground heat remains high and exceeds a certain threshold. These "dry season" storms will occur in the afternoon.

== Tourism ==
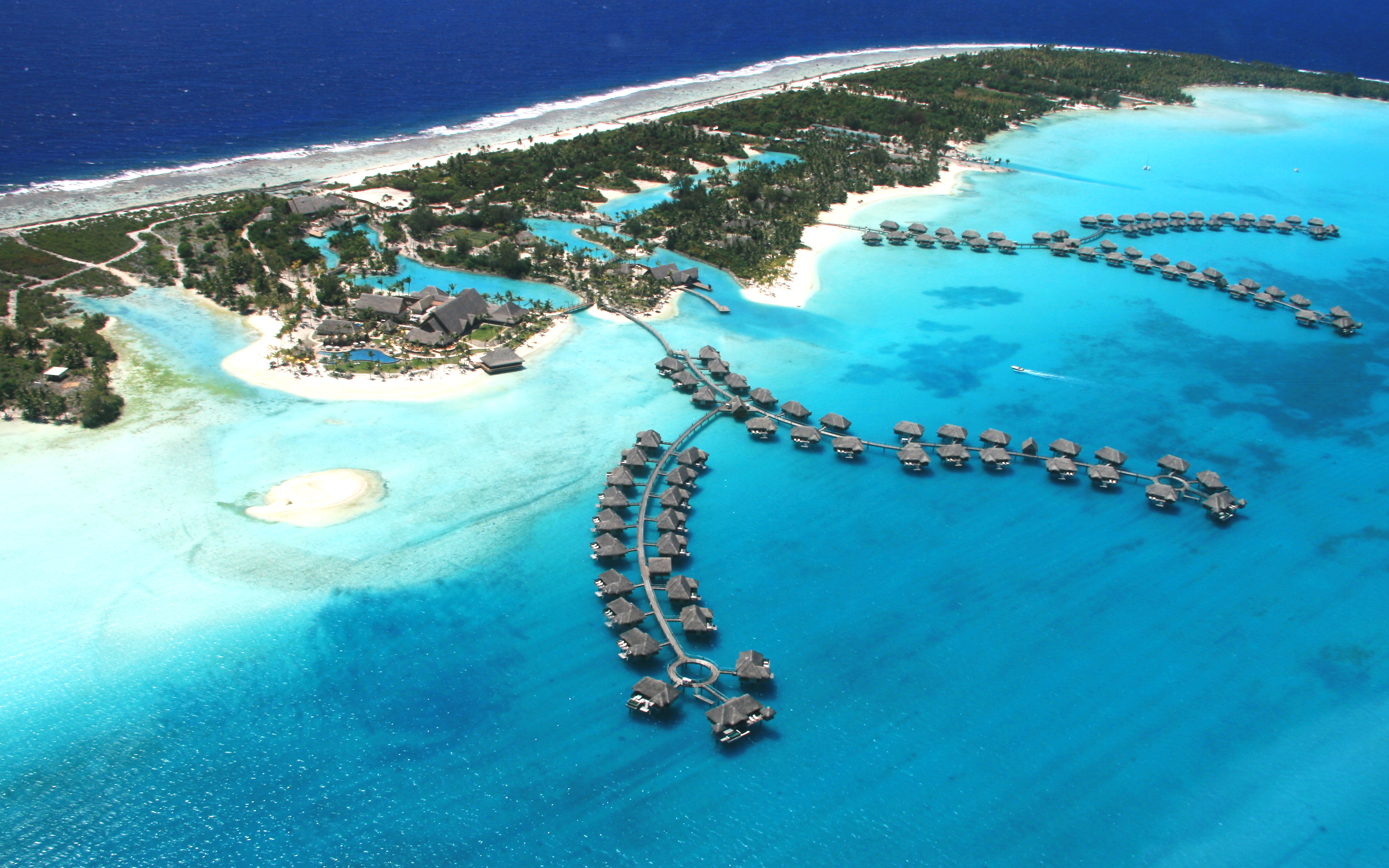
Four Seasons Resort Bora Bora

The island's economy is driven almost entirely by tourism. Several resorts have been built on the motu surrounding the lagoon. Hotel Bora Bora opened in 1961, and nine years later the first over-water bungalows on stilts over the lagoon were built. Today, over-water bungalows are a standard feature of most Bora Bora resorts. The bungalows range from relatively inexpensive basic accommodations to luxurious and expensive ones.

Most of the tourist destinations are sea-oriented; however, there are also tourist attractions on land, such as World War II cannons. Air Tahiti operates five or six flights daily between Tahiti and the Bora Bora Airport on Motu Mute (as well as occasional flights to and from other islands). A public bus (French: Le Truck) travels around the island in about an hour along the ring road stopping wherever passengers want,

Snorkeling and scuba diving in and around Bora Bora's lagoon are popular activities. Many species of sharks and rays inhabit the surrounding waters, as shark fishing has been banned since 2012, and a few dive operators on the island offer manta-ray and shark dives.

In addition to the existing islands of Bora Bora, the artificial island of Motu Marfo was added in the northeastern corner of the lagoon, on the St. Regis Resort property.

=== Places of interest ===
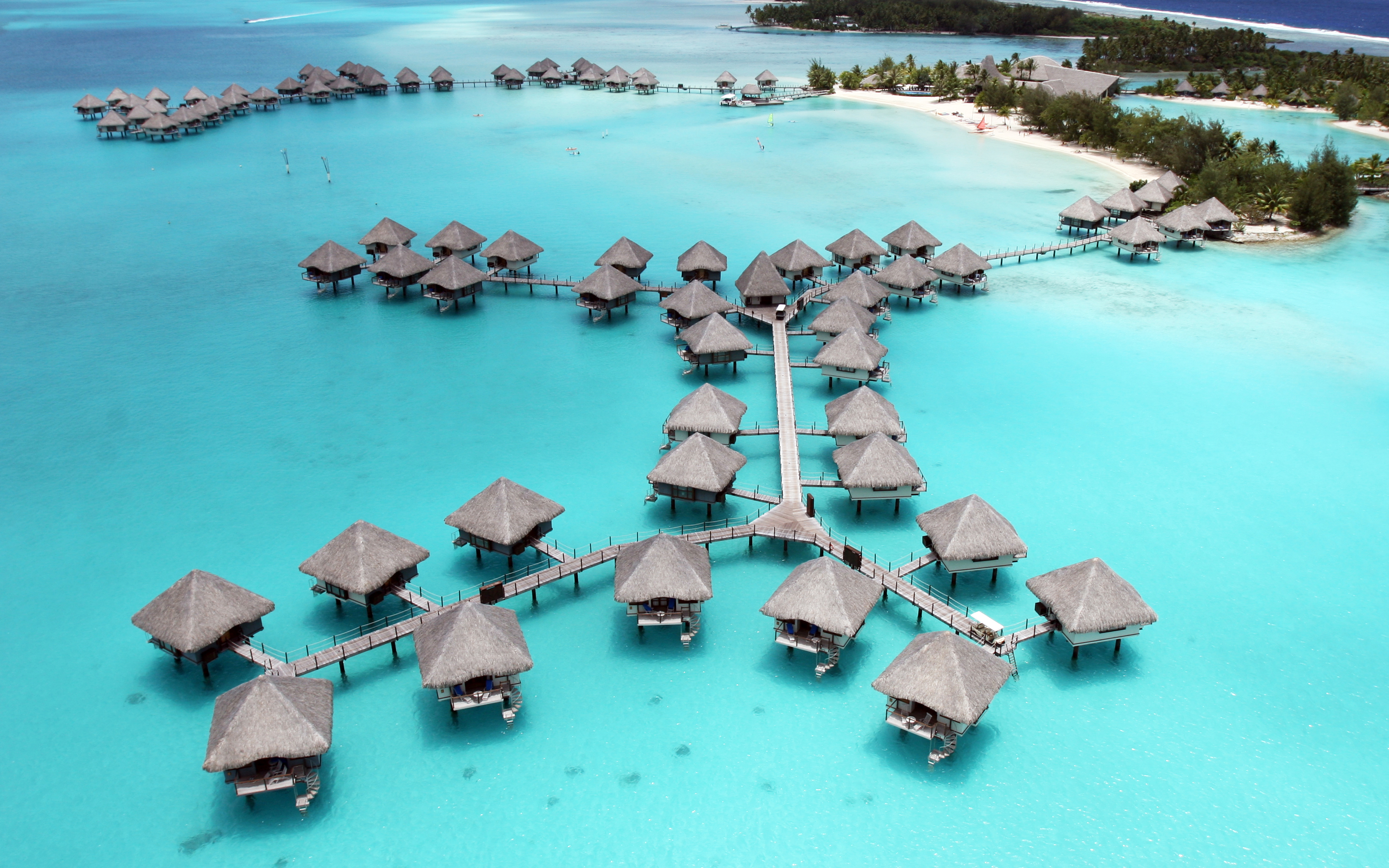
Le Meridien, Bora Bora

The main attraction of Bora Bora is the lagoon with its still intact underwater world. Using glass bottom boats, diving, and snorkeling, tourists explore the reef with it's thousands of colorful coral fish. In the deep lagoon, tourists feed barracudas and sharks during guided diving excursions. An attraction for divers is the "Stingray Strait", an area of the lagoon where several species of stingrays are found in large schools, including numerous manta rays and leopard rays.

Parts of the interior of the island can be explored on jeep safaris. However, the natural beauty of the island is best explored on foot. Several hikes can be done from Vaitape; guides are sometimes hired. People hike to the top of Mount Pahia, from where, according to legend, the war god Oro descended on a rainbow, leads through orchards, forests, orchid fields and fern-covered crevices. People also climb Mount Otemanu, which offers a panoramic view of the atoll. Below the summit is a large grotto where numerous frigate birds nest.

Another tourist attraction is the remains of what were more than 40 marae (ceremonial platforms). The best preserved are Marae Fare Opu in Faanui Bay and Marae Aehau-tai or Temaruteaoa at the eastern end of Vairau Bay. Another large Aboriginal ceremonial site is Marae Marotitini, in the north of the main island, right on the beach. The stone platform of the complex was originally 42 m (138 ft) long and was restored in 1968 by Japanese archaeologist Yosihiko Sinoto. Two stone box tombs of the royal family were found in the area of the complex.

Most beaches (and also the numerous hotels) are located in the two large bays between Pointe Paopao and Pointe Matira, in the southwest of the island. About five kilometers south of Vaitape, directly on the main road, is Bloody Mary's, a bar and restaurant frequented by many guests with its own yacht jetty. The two wooden plaques at the entrance list 230 names, including Marlon Brando, Jane Fonda, and Diana Ross.

== Flora and fauna ==
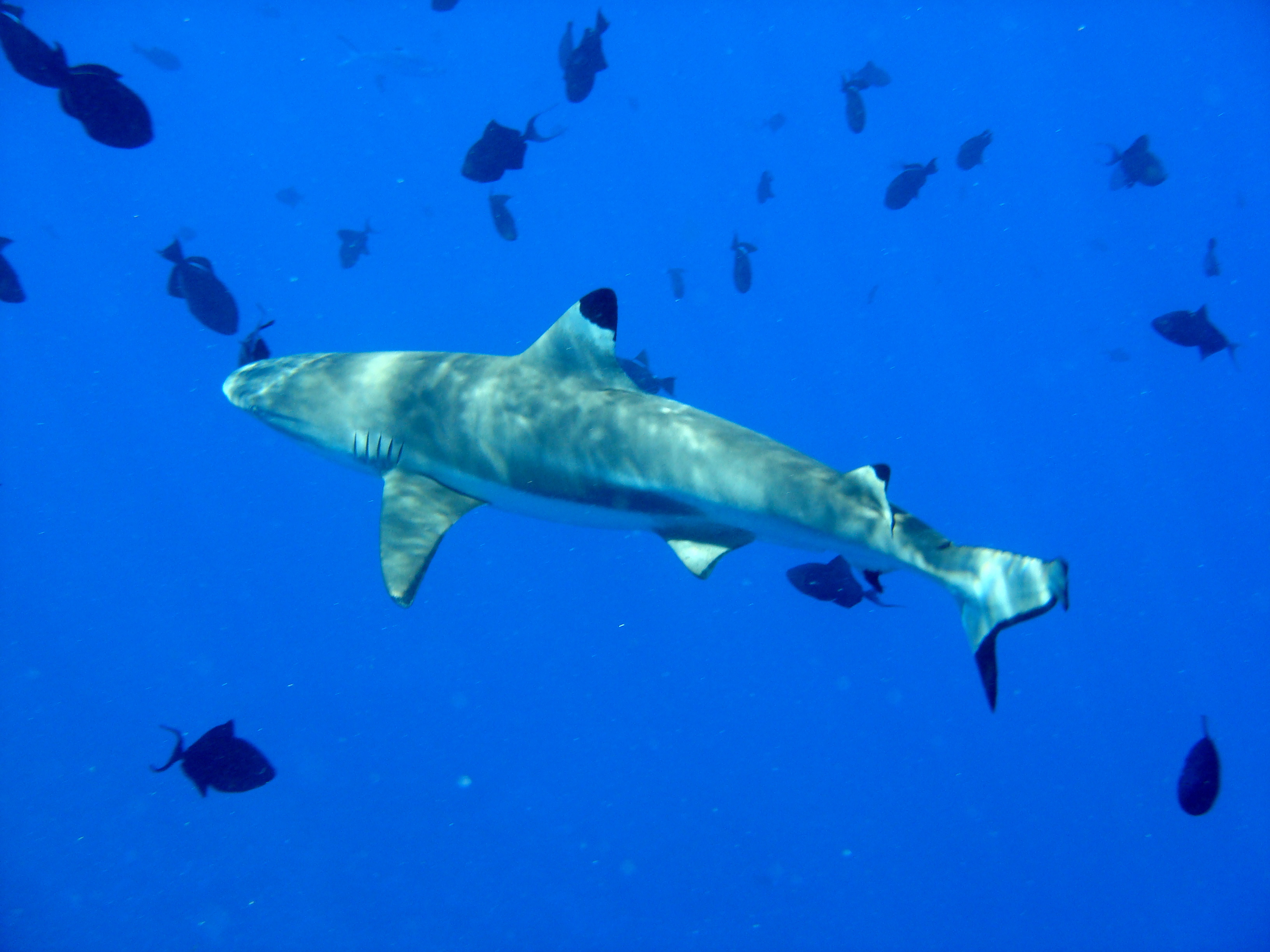
Blacktip reef shark (Carcharhinus melanopterus) at Bora Bora

In the relatively densely populated and intensively used lowland regions for a Polynesian atoll, hardly any remnants of the original vegetation remain. In contrast, the flora of the high, steep mountains, which are difficult to access, remains largely untouched.

The back beach areas are fringed with low-lying, heavily vegetated Cordia subcordata and Hibiscus tiliaceus. A cultivated form with a straight trunk and a rounded crown, Hibiscus tiliaceus var. sterilis, is often planted as roadside vegetation.

Up to the foot of the steep mountainous region, there is mainly cultivated land, with plantations of coconut palms, breadfruit trees, Tahitian chestnuts (Inocarpus), cassava (Manihot), and tropical fruits, as well as orchid plantations for the decoration of tourist hotels. Abandoned areas have been conquered by overgrown guavas and the fern Dicranopteris linearis.

The crevices and ridges of the island's mountains are covered with largely undisturbed remnants of the island's original vegetation. These include groves of metrosider trees; stands of Wikstroemia coriacea, a species of the daphne family endemic to Polynesia; and a few species of Glochidion. The humid and shady crevices are densely populated with ferns.

Historically, Bora Bora's virgin forest habitats on the slopes of Mount Otemanu had a very diverse assortment of snail and slug species (gastropods) compared to other islands. Several species of endemic or native species existed in great numbers until relatively recently; however, after Lissachatina, Euglandina, and various flatworms were introduced to the island, they wiped out the populations of the endemic partulid species Partula lutea the late 1990s, Samoana attenuata (a species once native to Bora Bora but later not found in surveys of the island), and Mautodontha boraborensis (a critically endangered species as of 1996 but most likely extinct, as it was last seen in the 1880s). The above-listed native and endemic species were mostly restricted to the virgin forests, and the only species that remain common (perhaps even extant) are several subulinids and tornatellinids among others, including Orobophana pacifica (a helicinid).

Many species of sharks and rays inhabit the strip of water surrounding the island. There are dive operators that offer dives to observe the fish and watch the sharks feed.

== Demographics ==
In 2012, the population was 9,858, which increased to 10,605 according to 2017 estimates.

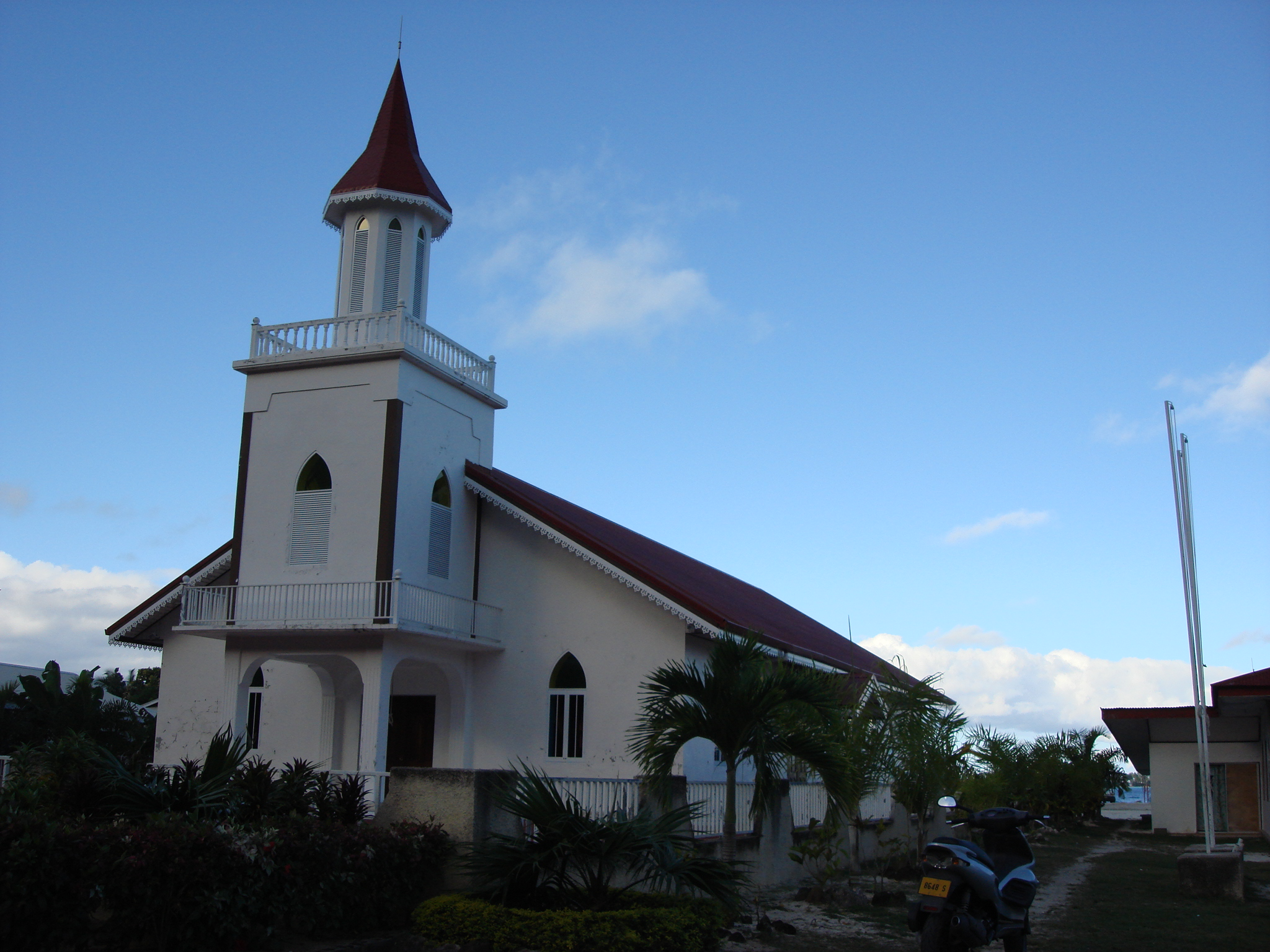
Church on Anau, Bora Bora

=== Religion ===
Christianity has been the dominant religion since the arrival of Christian missionaries in the 19th century, when it replaced the old traditional beliefs that Europeans considered idolatry. Vaitape was founded by British missionary John Muggridge Orsmond (1788–1856) of the London Missionary Society. He came to Bora Bora from Tahiti in 1824 and built a church, a wharf, roads and houses, and a missionary school made of coral rock. This settlement, called "Beulah", became what is now Vaitape.

With the establishment of the French protectorate, the presence of the Catholic Church was reinforced. Today, it administers a church island's capital (Vaitape), called Saint-Pierre-Célestin Church (French: Église de Saint-Pierre-Célestin). It depends on the Metropolitan Archdiocese of Papeete with its seat in Tahiti.

Numerous pre-Christian relics from the native Polynesians of Bora Bora are still preserved today: remains of 13 ceremonial platforms (marae) – there used to be more than forty – and many petroglyphs, which, however, are mostly hidden in inaccessible bushes. The best preserved ceremonial site is the Marae Fare Opu in Faʻanui Bay, located directly on the beach. Today, a road runs through the area, so the overview of the site, which is quite large, has been lost. The site consisted of a rectangular, level area bounded by boulders and a stone platform. The rectangular platform is bounded by limestone slabs over 1 m high and filled with earth. Two of the slabs on the north side have stone carvings with turtle motifs.

=== Languages ===
French, as in the rest of France, is the sole official language of Bora-Bora; it and Tahitian are the main languages spoken by its inhabitants in a common way. In addition, those in contact with tourists generally have some basic knowledge of English.

Most visitors to Bora Bora are American, Australian, Japanese, or European.

== Politics and government ==
The atoll has been part of France since the 19th century. Its island capital is Vaitape. The Tupai Atoll, nearby and uninhabited, is an administrative dependency of Bora Bora. The municipality Bora-Bora consists of the island of Bora Bora and the Tupai Atoll. The mayor of Bora Bora has been Gaston Tong Sang since 9 July 1989.

Bora Bora is politically part of French Polynesia. The island is a French overseas territory and is not part of the European Union. It is administered by a subdivision of the High Commissariat of the Republic in French Polynesia (French: Haut-commissariat de la République en Polynésie française) based in Papeete. Bora-Bora is one of the seven municipalities of the Leeward Islands Administrative Subdivision (French: Subdivision administrative des Îles sous le Vent), and in turn is subdivided into the three submunicipalities (French: Communes associées) of Nunue, Faʻanui (plus Tupai Atoll, further north) and Anau. The currency is the CFP franc, which is pegged to the euro.

== Transportation ==
Bora Bora can be reached via the Bora Bora Airport. On the main island, rental cars and bicycles are the usual transportation for tourists. There are also helicopter tours and off-road vehicle or catamaran rentals in Vaitape. On the main island, a public bus (French: Le Truck) travels around the island in about an hour along the ring road. Stops are not necessary; the bus stops wherever passengers want. However, the usual means of transport for tourists are bicycle, moped or motorcycle, and the shuttle service offered by some hotels. Small electric cars can be rented in Vaitape. There is a private helicopter stationed on the island, which is used for tourist flights.a public bus (French: Le Truck) travels around the island in about an hour along the ring road. Stops are not necessary; the bus stops wherever passengers want.

== Sports ==
In terms of sports, Bora Bora is, along with neighboring Huahine, Raiatea, and Tahaa, one of the four islands among which the Hawaiki Nui Va'a, an international competition of Polynesian canoes (va'a), is held.

== Notable people ==
- Anne Chevalier (1912–1977), actress and dancer
- Tarita Teriipaia (born 1941), French actress and third wife of famous American actor Marlon Brando
- Paul-Émile Victor (1907–1995), ethnologist and explorer, died in Bora Bora
- Teva Victor (born 1971), sculptor and son of Paul-Emile Victor

== See also ==
- List of volcanoes in French Polynesia
- List of reduplicated place names
- Administrative divisions of French Polynesia
