= Demographics of French Polynesia =

Demographic features of the population of French Polynesia include population density, ethnicity, religious affiliations and other aspects.

== Population ==
Census population

Year	Pop.	±% p.a.
1907	30,600	—
1911	31,900	+1.05%
1921	31,600	−0.09%
1926	35,900	+2.58%
1931	40,400	+2.39%
1936	44,000	+1.72%
1941	51,200	+3.08%

Year	Pop.	±% p.a.
1946	58,200	+2.60%
1951	63,300	+1.69%
1956	76,323	+3.81%
1962	84,551	+1.72%
1971	119,168	+3.89%
1977	137,382	+2.40%
1983	166,753	+3.28%

Year	Pop.	±% p.a.
1988	188,814	+2.52%
1996	219,521	+1.90%
2002	245,516	+1.88%
2007	259,596	+1.12%
2012	268,270	+0.66%
2017	275,918	+0.56%
2022	278,786	+0.21%

Official figures from past censuses.

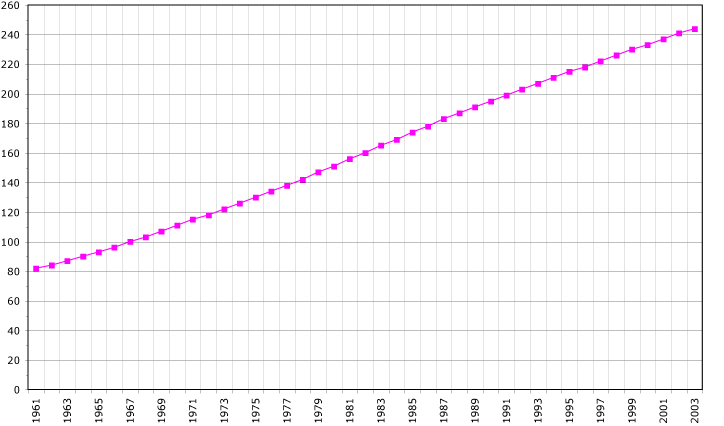
Demographics of French Polynesia

=== Structure of the population ===
Population Estimates by Sex and Age Group (01.VII.2021) (Post-censal estimates.):

Age group	Male	Female	Total	%
Total	141 479	137 970	279 448	100
0–4	8 334	7 742	16 076	5.75
5–9	10 391	9 721	20 112	7.20
10–14	11 259	10 710	21 969	7.86
15–19	11 055	10 655	21 710	7.77
20–24	10 126	9 582	19 708	7.05
25–29	9 892	9 878	19 770	7.07
30–34	11 185	11 240	22 424	8.02
35–39	10 934	11 189	22 123	7.92
40–44	10 019	9 915	19 934	7.13
45–49	9 807	9 623	19 430	6.95
50–54	9 960	9 466	19 426	6.95
55–59	8 621	8 165	16 785	6.01
60–64	6 804	6 348	13 152	4.71
65–69	5 425	5 156	10 581	3.79
70–74	3 299	3 338	6 636	2.37
75–79	2 353	2 478	4 831	1.73
80–84	1 274	1 539	2 813	1.01
85–89	573	874	1 446	0.52
90–94	145	262	407	0.15
95–99	22	79	101	0.04
100+	1	12	13	<0.01
Age group	Male	Female	Total	Percent
0–14	29 984	28 173	58 157	20.81
15–64	98 403	96 059	194 462	69.59
65+	13 092	13 738	26 830	9.60

== Vital statistics ==
=== Births and deaths ===
Year	Population	Live births	Deaths	Natural change	Crude birth rate	Crude death rate	Rate of natural change	TFR
1945		2,025	843	1,182				
1946		2,288	1,081	1,207				
1947		2,210	1,201	1,009				
1948		2,378	1,068	1,310				
1949		2,457	978	1,479				
1950		2,489	1,131	1,358				
1951		2,295	1,626	669				
1952		2,902	948	1,954				
1953		2,892	945	1,947				
1954		3,019	838	2,181				
1955		3,217	841	2,376				
1956		3,403	837	2,566				
1957		3,296	901	2,395				
1958		3,081	920	2,161				
1959		3,486	832	2,654				
1960		3,624	936	2,688				
1961		3,502	1,041	2,461				
1962		3,797	787	3,010				
1963		3,912	884	3,028				
1964		4,177	912	3,265				
1965		4,266	1,030	3,236				
1966		4,071	1,090	2,981				
1967		4,819	973	3,846				
1968		4,567	968	3,599				
1969		4,597	977	3,620				
1970		4,390	1,065	3,325				
1971		4,368	1,018	3,350				
1972		4,334	958	3,376				
1973		4,202	940	3,262				
1974		4,307	896	3,411				
1975		4,404	953	3,451				
1976		4,252	1,047	3,205				
1977		4,393	983	3,410				
1978		4,272	1,120	3,152				
1979		4,331	1,020	3,311				
1980		4,544	1,005	3,539				
1981		4,771	966	3,805				
1982		4,818	1,008	3,810				
1983		5,008	918	4,090				
1984	169,841	5,206	881	4,325	30.7	5.2	25.5	3.762
1985	174,342	5,417	980	4,437	31.1	5.6	25.5	3.792
1986	178,903	5,413	962	4,451	30.3	5.4	24.9	3.645
1987	183,435	5,418	1,040	4,378	29.5	5.7	23.8	3.527
1988	187,940	5,802	976	4,826	30.9	5.2	25.7	3.674
1989	192,235	5,513	1,077	4,436	28.7	5.6	23.1	3.418
1990	196,398	5,570	974	4,596	28.4	5.0	23.4	3.394
1991	200,535	5,409	1,011	4,398	27.0	5.0	22.0	3.213
1992	204,510	5,313	1,049	4,264	26.0	5.1	20.9	3.104
1993	208,408	5,299	1,051	4,248	25.4	5.0	20.4	3.049
1994	212,185	5,110	1,070	4,040	24.1	5.0	19.1	2.902
1995	215,736	4,904	1,097	3,807	22.7	5.1	17.6	2.734
1996	219,150	4,847	1,019	3,828	22.1	4.7	17.4	2.682
1997	222,878	4,702	1,079	3,623	21.1	4.8	16.3	2.567
1998	226,851	4,564	1,102	3,462	20.1	4.9	15.2	2.457
1999	230,921	4,835	1,005	3,830	20.9	4.4	16.5	2.564
2000	235,213	4,933	1,020	3,913	21.0	4.3	16.7	2.574
2001	239,451	4,873	1,154	3,719	20.4	4.8	15.6	2.495
2002	243,241	4,759	1,108	3,651	19.6	4.6	15.0	2.405
2003	246,555	4,497	1,109	3,388	18.2	4.5	13.7	2.236
2004	249,714	4,426	1,106	3,320	17.7	4.4	13.3	2.181
2005	252,794	4,461	1,224	3,237	17.6	4.8	12.8	2.166
2006	255,945	4,591	1,134	3,457	17.9	4.4	13.5	2.198
2007	258,929	4,426	1,190	3,236	17.1	4.6	12.5	2.103
2008	261,252	4,629	1,168	3,461	17.7	4.5	13.2	2.183
2009	263,117	4,542	1,262	3,280	17.3	4.8	12.5	2.140
2010	264,916	4,581	1,261	3,320	17.3	4.8	12.5	2.152
2011	266,639	4,357	1,242	3,115	16.3	4.7	11.7	2.037
2012	268,153	4,284	1,360	2,924	16.0	5.1	10.9	2.004
2013	269,713	4,182	1,445	2,737	15.5	5.4	10.1	1.950
2014	271,438	4,160	1,442	2,718	15.3	5.3	10.0	1.948
2015	273,042	3,893	1,409	2,484	14.3	5.2	9.1	1.829
2016	274,570	3,976	1,394	2,582	14.5	5.1	9.4	1.869
2017	275,765	3,826	1,612	2,214	13.9	5.8	8.0	1.806
2018	276,621	3,817	1,618	2,199	13.8	5.8	7.9	1.820
2019	277,425	3,647	1,626	2,021	13.1	5.9	7.3	1.759
2020	278,134	3,731	1,714	2,017	13.4	6.2	7.3	1.812
2021	278,529	3,727	2,330	1,397	13.4	8.4	5.0	1.824
2022	278,772	3,640	1,697	1,943	13.1	6.1	7.0	1.796
2023	279,171	3,518	1,802	1,716	12.6	6.5	6.1	1.762
2024	279,424	3,267	1,845	1,422	11.7	6.6	5.1	1.663
2025	279,491	3,167	1,839	1,328	11.3	6.6	4.7	1.616

== Ethnic groups ==
- Polynesian (Tahitian) 78%
- Chinese 12%
- local French 6%
- metropolitan French 4%

== Languages ==
Languages of French Polynesia
- Official: French, Tahitian
- Indigenous: Austral, Mangareva, Marquesan, Rapa, Tahitian, Tuamotuan
- Immigrant: Chinese, English
- Foreign: English
- Keyboard layout: AZERTY, QWERTY

- French (official) 73.5%
- Tahitian (official) 20.1%
- Marquesan 2.6%
- Austral languages 1.2%
- Paumotu 1%
- other 1.6%

== Religion ==
- Protestant 54%
- Catholic 30%
- Other 10%
- No religion 6%

== See also ==
- French Polynesia
- Europeans in Oceania
- Demographics of France
