= Tubuai =

Island in French Polynesia

- Commune
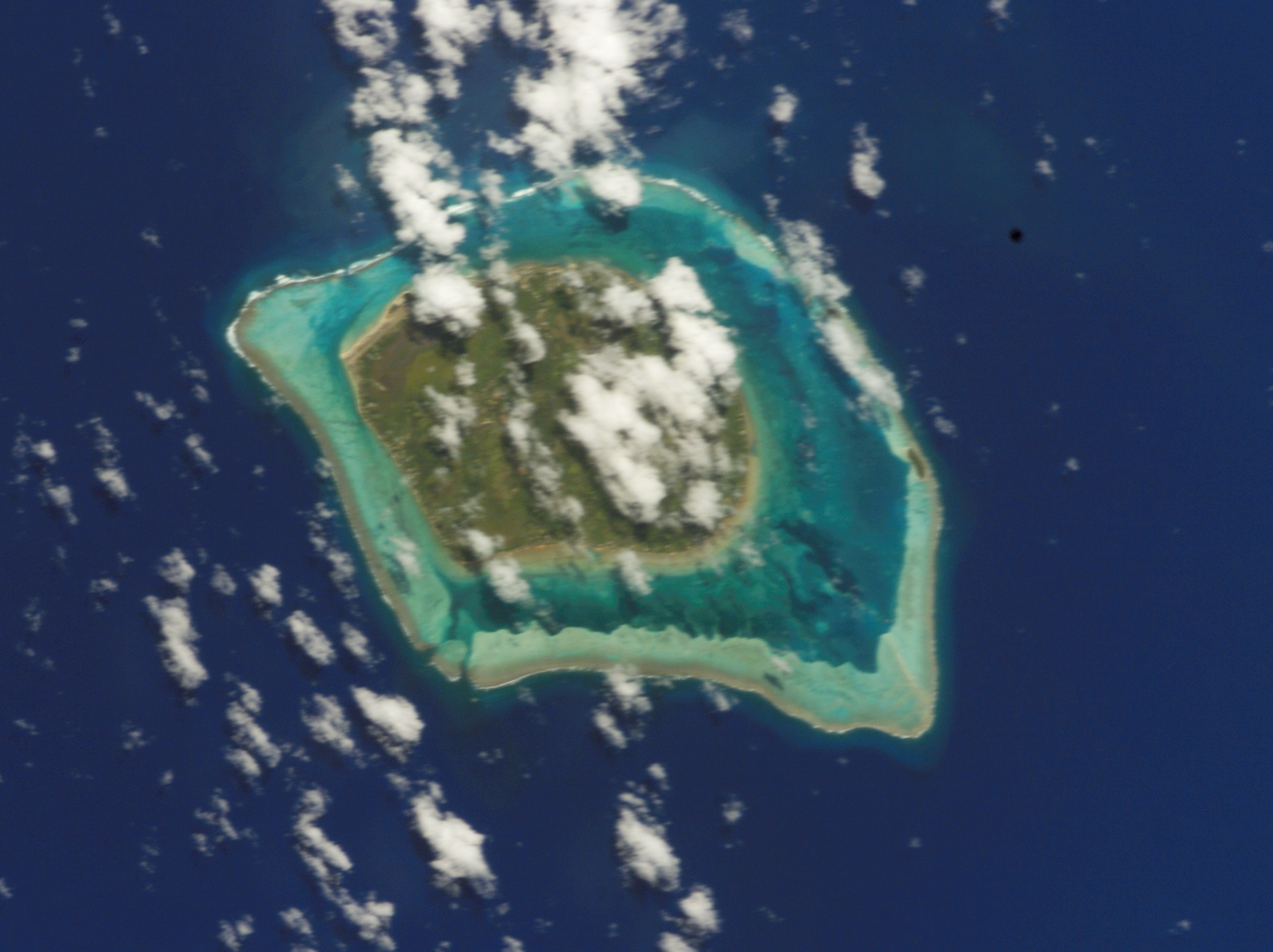
- NASA picture of Tubuai

- Flag

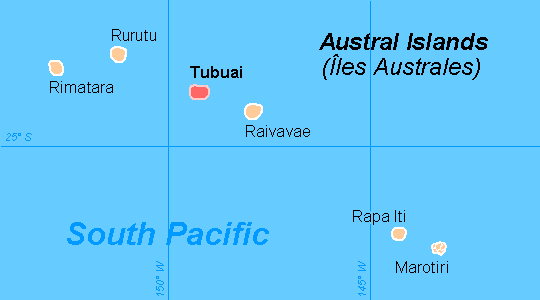
- Location of Tubuai
- Coordinates: 23°22′12″S 149°28′48″W
- Country: France
- Overseas collectivity: French Polynesia
- Subdivision: Austral Islands

Government
  - Mayor (2020–2026): Fernand Tahiata
- Area^{1}: 45.0 km^{2} (17.4 sq mi)
- Highest elevation: 422 m (1,385 ft)
- Lowest elevation: 0 m (0 ft)
- Population (2022): 2,185
  - Density: 48.6/km^{2} (126/sq mi)
- Time zone: UTC−10:00
- INSEE/Postal code: 98753 /98754
- ^{1} French Land Register data, which excludes lakes, ponds, glaciers > 1 km^{2} (0.386 sq mi or 247 acres) and river estuaries.

Tupuaʻi (French: Tubuai [tubwaj]) is the main island of the Austral Island group, located 640 km (400 mi) south of Tahiti. In addition to Tubuai, the group of islands include Rimatara, Rurutu, Raivavae, Rapa and the uninhabited Îles Maria. They are part of the Austral Islands in the far southwest of French Polynesia in the south Pacific Ocean. Tubuai sustains a population of 2,185 people on 45 km^{2} (18 sq. mi.) of land. Due to its southerly position, Tubuai has notably cooler weather than Tahiti.

The island is ringed by a lagoon formed by an encircling coral reef. A break in the reef that allows ships to pass is on the island's north side. Tubuai has two lava domes, with its highest point, Mt. Taita'a, being 422 meters (1385 feet). Six or seven islets or motus lie along the reef rim that encircles the island. These were described in the late 1700s as having an abundance of toa trees (Casuarina equisetifolia), which the indigenous peoples used in house building and to make war clubs and spears due to the wood's density.

The islanders speak the Tupuaʻi dialect of the Austral language, which has absorbed significant Tahitian vocabulary.

== History ==
=== Early Polynesia ===
The island has been inhabited since at least 1215CE. In the ancient past, a road was built that encircled the island. There exists on the island today the stone ruins of a "great number of structures, house platforms, marae complexes, and cemeteries [...]" According to David Stanley's South Pacific Handbook, "[t]he Austral islands were one of the great art areas of the Pacific, represented today in many museums. The best-known artifacts are tall sharkskin drums, wooden bowls, fly-whisks, and tapa cloth."

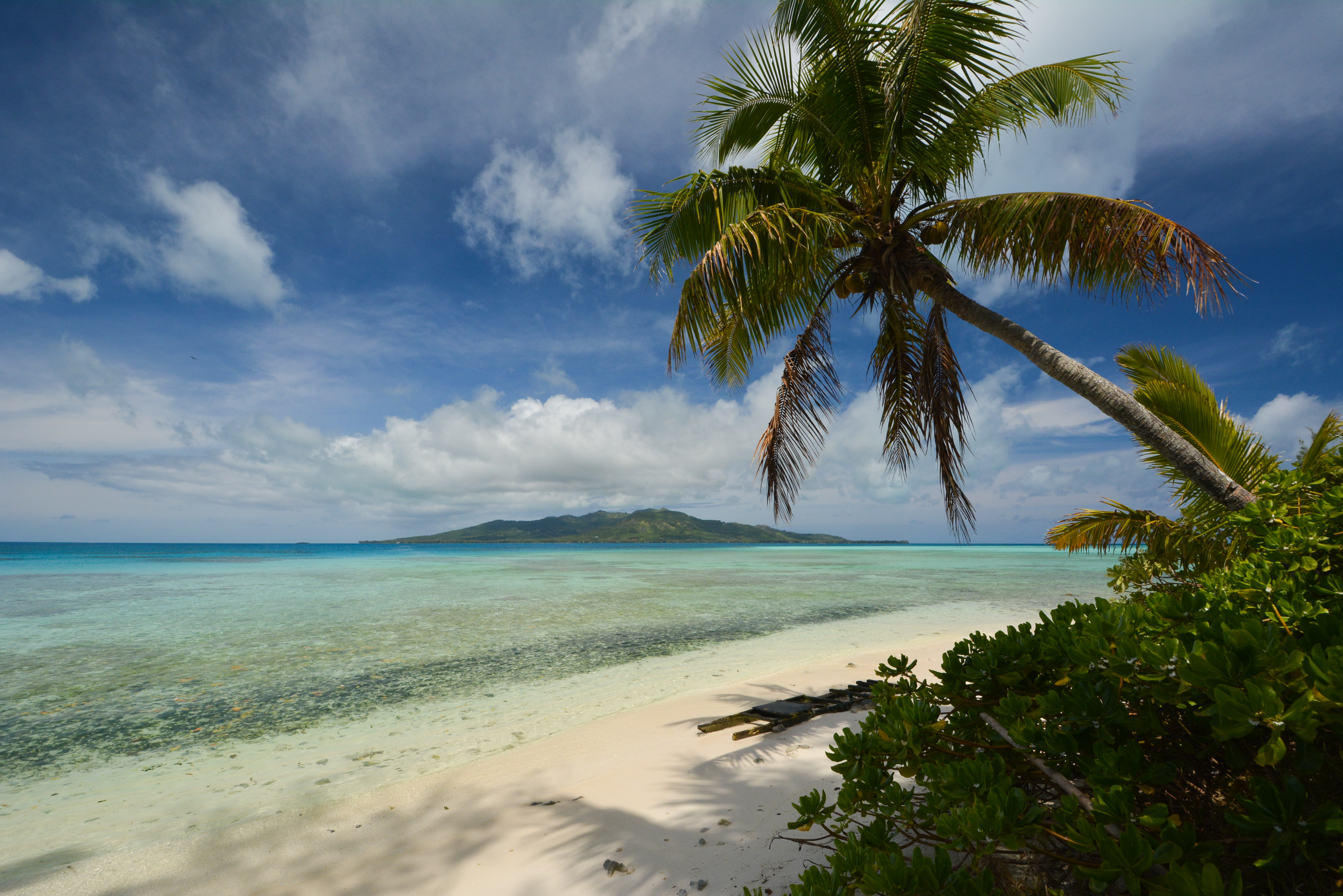
View of Tubuai looking across the lagoon from one of its motus

=== Arrival of Bounty mutineers ===
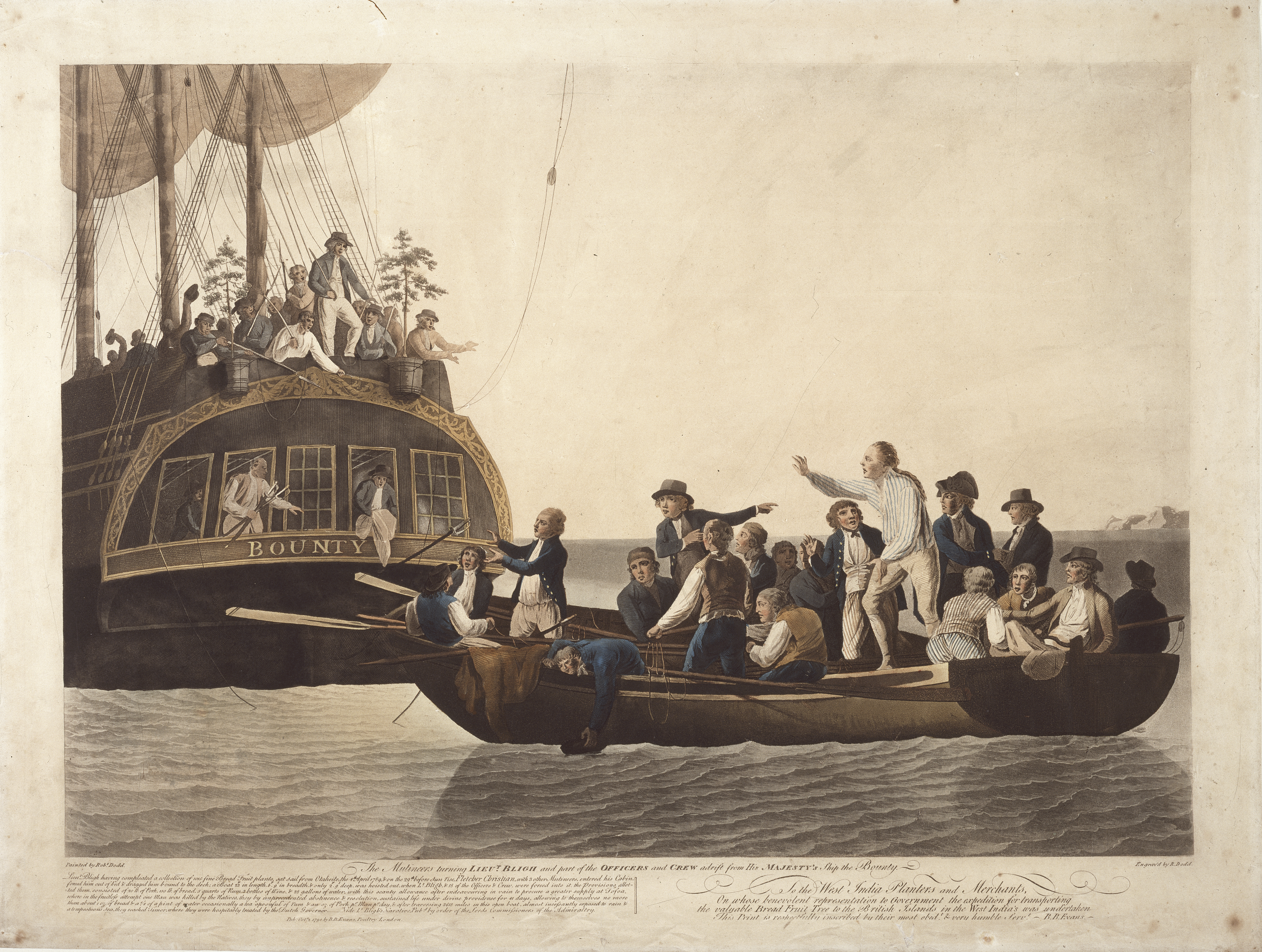
Bounty Mutineers

Tubuai was first seen by Europeans when James Cook mapped it in 1777, although his party did not disembark. Cook discovered the island's name, "Toobouai", from the natives who surrounded his ship in their canoes; a Tahitian named Omai, who was part of Cook's group, translated.

The next Europeans to arrive were the mutineers of HMS Bounty in 1789. Mutineer Fletcher Christian, in looking for an island on which to hide permanently, had "scoured" William Bligh's maps and nautical charts and decided on Tubuai.

Upon arrival at Tubuai, a conflict arose while the mutineers were still on their ship, and several islanders were killed in their canoes. The site of this event in the lagoon on the north side of the island is called Baie Sanglant ("Bloody Bay").

Mutineer James Morrison wrote: "The Island is full of Inhabitants for its size and may contain 3000 souls." After only ten days on the island, the mutineers sailed for Tahiti to get women and livestock, in which they were only nominally successful. When they returned to Tubuai, they built a fort on the northeast part of the island at Ta'ahueia, manned with cannon and swivel gun, which they named Fort George. The mutineer leader, Fletcher Christian, knew that settling on Tahiti was sure to mean the mutineers' eventual discovery and arrest, so despite being viewed as intruders, Christian was reluctant to view permanent settlement on Tubuai as unfeasible. Christian favoured using diplomacy over time to obtain wives eventually, but many of the other mutineers insisted on raiding parties to take wives by force.

The islanders of Tubuai did not want to allow their women to stay at the mutineer camp or to allow them to become wives. They also were not disposed to trade food. It was not long before armed parties of mutineers started burning houses and desecrating marae during skirmishes to obtain women. More battles ensued, and more natives were killed. One mutineer, the heavily tattooed Thomas Burkett (who was later tried and hanged in England for mutiny), was speared in the side by one of the islanders during one of the skirmishes.

After only two months since their first arrival on Tubuai, the mutineers left for good.

=== 19th century ===
Increased contact with Europeans also meant more exposure to diseases to which the islanders had no immunity. This proved particularly devastating to the population of Tubuai. At some point during the 30 years from when the mutineers left the island on September 17, 1789, and the early 1820s when accounts by Christian missionaries began to be recorded, the population that was estimated by the mutineer Morrison to be 3000 was now reduced to no more than 300 people. One Protestant minister when visiting a congregation on Tubuai on January 3, 1824, wrote that several islanders were still suffering from a devastating illness. He described the symptoms and noted that several hundred had died within the previous four years.

On April 30, 1844, four early missionaries for the Church of Jesus Christ of Latter-day Saints arrived in Tubuai. Spearheaded by Addison Pratt, the missionaries baptized 60 residents in the first year. In the coming years, this number would grow to hundreds of baptisms.

== Geography ==
Map of the island

Tupua'i is located just north of the Tropic of Capricorn. The island is at the centre of the Austral Islands, located 195 km from Ra'ivāvae, 210 km from Rurutu, 700 km from Rapa Iti and 640 km south of Tahiti.

It consists of two former sets of volcanic peaks on Mount Taita'a (422 m (1,385 ft)), which are separated by the collar of Huahine (35 m (115 ft)). Its area is 45 square kilometres (17 square miles), surrounded by a large lagoon, the largest of the Austral Islands.

The coral reef that surrounds it in effect creates a lagoon of 85 square kilometres (33 square miles), an area almost double that of the island. It sometimes reaches 5 kilometres (3.1 miles) wide. Its depth is low, resulting in a characteristic turquoise or jade color. For a large part, its depth is around 6 metres (20 feet). However, it can reach up to 25 metres (82 feet) in some parts of the Southeast. The waters are constantly replenished by a strong, fairly constant ocean current, which helps preserve the lagoon habitat and the health of the coral reef. The generally cooler waters and, until recently, very low pollution have also helped sustain this environment.

Many small streams run through the island, though they often empty into swamps rather than the sea. These swamps represent a fairly large portion of the island. Only the river Vaiohuru has any real flow.

Eight offshore motu surround the main island (with an additional 0.4 km^{2}; 100 acres):

- Motu One (also known as îlot de sable (Sandly Islet) in the North)
- Motu Rautaro
- Motu Toena
- Motu Roa (also called Motu Tāpapatava'e)
- Motu Mitihā (originally Motiha'a)
- Motu 'Ōfa'i (also called îlot caillou (Rock Island))
- 'Iri'iriroa
- Îlot plat (Flat Island)

The islets above are listed clockwise from the north of the island. The last two islands are often submerged and hence not visible.

The motu 'Ōfa'i is itself the only island that was not formed through coral, being composed of basalt, hence its name. It is also the only volcanic outcrop on the island, aside from the main island.

== Climate ==
The climate of Tubuai is cooler than Tahiti, with temperatures averaging 20–25 °C (68–77 °F). The island has hot, muggy summers and warm, humid winters with ample precipitation all year. The lowest temperature measured on the island was 9.2 °C (48.6 °F) on 31 August 1951. The highest was 32.7 °C (90.9 °F) on 25 March 1980. The lagoon waters typically reach 26 °C (79 °F) in summer but only drop a few degrees in winter.

Rainfall is high, averaging about 2000 mm (78 inches) per year, with about 1700 mm (67 inches) per year in 2006 and 2007. The highest recorded rainfall was 2839 mm (112 inches) in 1962 and the lowest was 1186 mm (47 inches) in 1952. The record for rainfall in a day is in turn 191 mm (8 inches) on 23 April 1942.

Hours of sunlight are about average for Australians. They are around 1970 hours per year, one of the lowest levels in Polynesia. The humidity is lower than in Tahiti, in the order of a few percent, mainly due to its higher latitude and lower altitude (causing it to retain fewer clouds).

The trade winds coming from the Southeast are the prevailing winds. Those coming from the North or Northwest are synonymous with a change towards more sunny days. The maximum recorded wind speeds, however, never exceeded 100 mph (160 km/h; 45 m/s).

The island has also been the scene of several cyclones, though they are not very frequent and are often weakened before reaching landfall (as with Cyclone Meena in 2005). However, much bigger cyclones occasionally hit the island. As such, on 5 February 2010, Tupua'i found itself in the path of Cyclone Oli with winds averaging 160 km/h (100 mph) (gusting nearly 220 km/h; 140 mph).

Average weather records on Tupua'i:

Climate data for Tubuai (Mataura 1, 1981−2010 normals, extremes 1948−2014)
Month	Jan	Feb	Mar	Apr	May	Jun	Jul	Aug	Sep	Oct	Nov	Dec	Year
Record high °C (°F)	32.0 (89.6)	32.0 (89.6)	32.7 (90.9)	32.3 (90.1)	32.0 (89.6)	31.0 (87.8)	30.0 (86.0)	30.0 (86.0)	29.0 (84.2)	30.0 (86.0)	30.0 (86.0)	32.0 (89.6)	32.7 (90.9)
Mean daily maximum °C (°F)	28.0 (82.4)	28.6 (83.5)	28.6 (83.5)	27.4 (81.3)	25.8 (78.4)	24.4 (75.9)	23.9 (75.0)	23.7 (74.7)	23.9 (75.0)	24.7 (76.5)	25.9 (78.6)	26.9 (80.4)	26.0 (78.8)
Daily mean °C (°F)	25.7 (78.3)	26.2 (79.2)	26.0 (78.8)	24.9 (76.8)	23.2 (73.8)	21.7 (71.1)	21.2 (70.2)	21.0 (69.8)	21.1 (70.0)	22.1 (71.8)	23.4 (74.1)	24.5 (76.1)	23.4 (74.2)
Mean daily minimum °C (°F)	23.3 (73.9)	23.7 (74.7)	23.4 (74.1)	22.3 (72.1)	20.7 (69.3)	19.0 (66.2)	18.6 (65.5)	18.3 (64.9)	18.4 (65.1)	19.5 (67.1)	20.8 (69.4)	22.0 (71.6)	20.8 (69.5)
Record low °C (°F)	14.5 (58.1)	15.5 (59.9)	15.8 (60.4)	14.6 (58.3)	10.0 (50.0)	10.0 (50.0)	10.0 (50.0)	9.2 (48.6)	10.3 (50.5)	10.7 (51.3)	12.0 (53.6)	14.3 (57.7)	9.2 (48.6)
Average precipitation mm (inches)	194.4 (7.65)	192.4 (7.57)	176.3 (6.94)	165.3 (6.51)	153.3 (6.04)	119.0 (4.69)	136.0 (5.35)	133.4 (5.25)	104.8 (4.13)	116.5 (4.59)	133.9 (5.27)	200.4 (7.89)	1,825.7 (71.88)
Average precipitation days (≥ 1.0 mm)	13.2	12.9	13.3	12.5	12.4	11.4	11.2	11.3	9.6	9.9	10.2	13.2	141.1
Mean monthly sunshine hours	—	—	204.9	175.6	158.6	141.6	165.5	165.0	—	—	199.9	177.0	—
Source: Météo-France

== Demographics ==
Since the 1990s, the island's population has stabilized at approximately 2000 inhabitants.

Evolution of the population of Tupua'i since its discovery:

Communes	1777 (discovery by Europeans)	1820	1895	1977	1983	1988	1996	2007	2012	2017	2022
Tupua'i	about 3000	about 300	430	1419	1741	1846	2049	2050	2170	2217	2185
Mata'ura						868		954	1025	970	929
Ta'ahueia						558		552	572	645	662
Māhū						420		544	573	602	594

== Administration ==
Tubuai is the administrative capital of the Austral Islands, and the commune consists solely of this island and the six or seven motus surrounding it. Tubuai was annexed by France in 1881. The commune itself consists of the following associated communes:

- Mahu
- Mataura
- Taahuaia

== See also ==
- Flora of Tubuai
- Tubuai – Mataura Airport
- List of French islands in the Indian and Pacific oceans
- Natitua (submarine cable)
