= Bass Islands (French Polynesia) =

Archipelago in French Polynesia

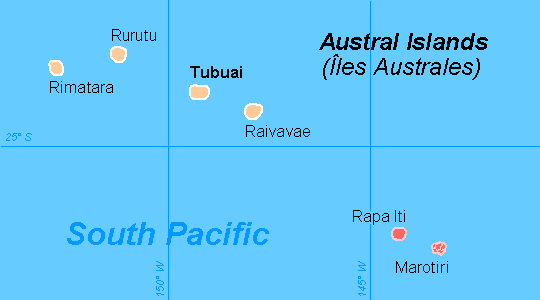
Location of the two Bass islands to the southeast of the Austral group.

The Bass Islands (French: Îles Bass or Îlots Bass) consist primarily of Rapa Iti (27°35′00″S 144°20′00″W) and Marotiri (27°55′00″S 143°26′00″W). They are usually considered to be the southernmost of the Austral Islands, although this classification is more one of geographic and political expediency than because of similarities between them and the rest of the Austral Islands. The Bass Islands, lying several degrees outside the tropics, are the southernmost islands in French Polynesia. Culturally, the Bass Islands appear to have been colonized about the same time as Tahiti and the Marquesas, and the culture and language (Rapan) appear to have diverged about the same time as well, indicating that they developed in relative isolation almost from the time of first settlement.

== Geography ==
It has an area of approximately 40.6 square kilometers. Geologically, the Bass Islands are distinguished from the Austral Islands in that their vulcanism appears to be much more recent.

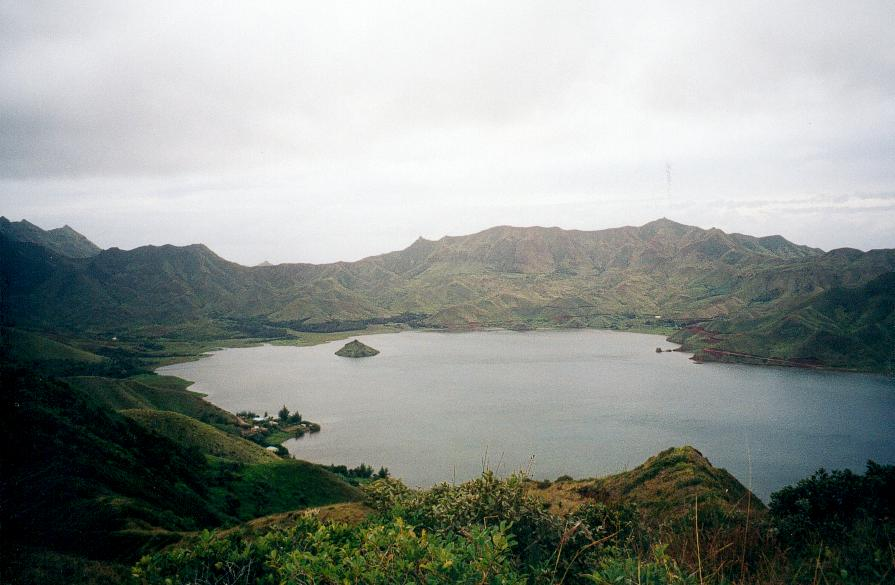
Rapa, Bass Islands

Rapa, sometimes called Rapa Iti (Little Rapa, to distinguish it from "Rapa Nui" [Big Rapa], a name for Easter Island), is the largest and only inhabited island of the Bass Islands. An older name for the island is Oparo. Its area is 38.5 km^{2} with a population of 530 and a max elevation of 650 m. Its main town is Ahuréi.

Marotiri, with an area of 0,043 km^{2}, is a group of four uninhabited volcanic rocks protruding from the sea (and several submerged rocks), forming the southeastern end of the Austral Islands of French Polynesia. Marotiri is also known as Bass Rocks (Îlots de Bass in French), maybe according to the name of the European explorer George Bass. Marotiri is very isolated, located at 27°55′00″S 143°26′00″W, about 725 miles (1,167 km) west-south-westward of Pitcairn Island. The closest island is Rapa Iti, 75 km further northwest, but separated from it by an ocean depth of more than 1,500 meters. The rocks are part of the municipality of Rapa and uninhabitable by people. They form an important bird sanctuary.

Also nearby is the purported Neilson Reef or Lancaster Reef (27°01′00″S 146°02′00″W), a crescent-shaped reef to the north-northwest of Rapa.
