= The Tahitian Choir =

The Tahitian Choir is a choral group from the island known as Rapa Iti, one of the Bass Islands in the South Pacific, approximately 1,600 kilometers (1,000 miles) southeast of Tahiti. The choir is made up of 126 men and women. Their music portrays their traditional Tahitian life and dialect and has been recorded on two albums and one re-release, recordings produced by Ethnomusicologist Pascal Nabet Meyer.

== Discography ==
- Rapa Iti (1992), Triloka Records
- Rapa Iti, Vol. 2 (1994), Shanachie
- Rapa Iti (2004), Soulitude Records re-release with bonus track, enhanced
