= Ahurei =

Town in Rapa Iti, French Polynesia

Coordinates: 27.6189°S 144.3342°W

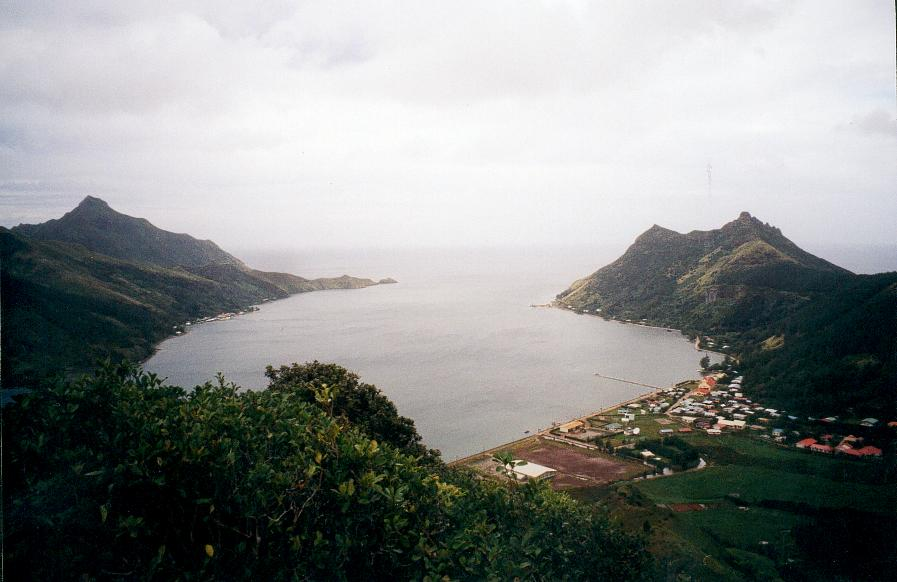
Ahuréi Bay with South Ahuréi visible on the right, North Ahuréi on the left

Ahuréi (sometimes called Ahurei, Ha'urei or Ha'uréi, latter two also show how it is pronounced), is the capital of Rapa and the rest of the Bass Islands of French Polynesia. It is located on both sides of the Baie d'Ahuréi.

Ahuréi consists of two suburbs: South Ahuréi, on the south side of the Baie d'Ahuréi, and North Ahuréi, on the north side of the Baie d'Ahuréi.

The town is the southernmost permanently inhabited settlement where French is an official language (not counting settlements with no civilian population).

== Climate ==
The town features a humid subtropical climate (Köppen Cfa) that closely borders on a tropical rainforest climate (Köppen Af).

Climate data for Ahurei
Month	Jan	Feb	Mar	Apr	May	Jun	Jul	Aug	Sep	Oct	Nov	Dec	Year
Mean daily maximum °C (°F)	25 (77)	26 (78)	26 (78)	24 (75)	22 (72)	21 (70)	20 (68)	19 (67)	20 (68)	21 (69)	22 (71)	23 (74)	22 (72)
Mean daily minimum °C (°F)	22 (72)	23 (73)	22 (72)	21 (69)	19 (67)	18 (64)	17 (62)	16 (61)	17 (62)	17 (63)	19 (66)	20 (68)	19 (67)
Average precipitation mm (inches)	270 (10.6)	200 (7.8)	260 (10.2)	250 (10)	260 (10.2)	210 (8.1)	240 (9.6)	240 (9.6)	200 (7.8)	180 (6.9)	200 (8)	230 (9)	2,750 (108.4)
Source: Weatherbase
