= Austral Islands =

Archipelago in French Polynesia

Native name: Îles Australes (French) / Tuha'a Pae (Tahitian)
- Flag of the Austral Islands

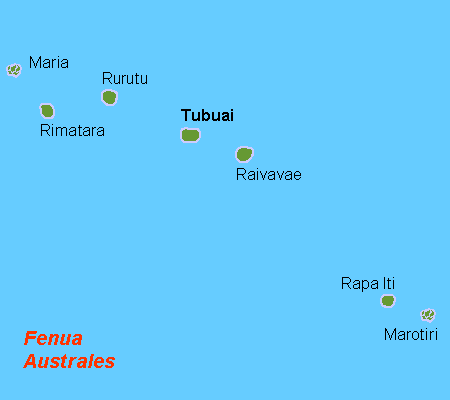

- Location within French Polynesia Location within Oceania Location within Pacific Ocean

Geography
- Location: Pacific Ocean
- Coordinates: 23.88°S 147.67°W
- Archipelago: Polynesia
- Total islands: 7
- Major islands: Tupua'i, Rūrutu, Ra'ivāvae, Rapa Iti
- Area: 152 km^{2} (59 sq mi)
- Highest elevation: 650 m (2130 ft)
- Highest point: Mont Perau

Administration
- France
- Collectivity: French Polynesia
- Largest settlement: Rūrutu (pop. 2,466)

Demographics
- Population: 6,965 (2017)
- Pop. density: 43/km^{2} (111/sq mi)
- Languages: French language, Tahitian, Rapa, Austral, Polynesian languages

Additional information
- Time zone: UTC-10

The Austral Islands (French: Îles Australes, officially Archipel des Australes; Tahitian: Tuha'a Pae) are the southernmost group of islands in French Polynesia, an overseas country of the French Republic in the South Pacific. Geographically, they consist of two separate archipelagos, namely in the northwest the Tupua'i islands (French: Îles Tubuaï) consisting of the Îles Maria, Rimatara, Rūrutu, Tupua'i Island proper and Ra'ivāvae, and in the southeast the Bass Islands (French: Îles basses) composed of the main island of Rapa Iti and the small Marotiri (also known as Bass Rocks or Îlots de Bass). Inhabitants of the islands are known for their pandanus fiber weaving skills. The islands of Maria and Marotiri are not suitable for sustained habitation. Several of the islands have uninhabited islets or rocks off their coastlines. Austral Islands' population is 6,965 on almost 150 km^{2} (58 sq mi). The capital of the Austral Islands administrative subdivision is Tupua'i.

== History ==
Whaling vessels were among the earliest and most consistent visitors to the islands in the 19th century. The first such vessel for which a record exists is the New Hazard in 1813. These ships came for fresh drinking water, firewood and food provisions.

=== Prehistory ===
The prehistory of the Austral Islands is largely in the dark, as only a few archaeological excavations have been carried out so far. The date of the earliest settlement is unclear, as radiocarbon dates are scarcely available. However, due to their peripheral location in the Polynesian Triangle, scholars suspect that the Austral Islands were colonized relatively late, possibly by visitors from the Society Islands, Mangareva, or the Cook Islands.

The Noble families of the Austral Islands and the clans of the Society Islands share kinship. For example, chief Tamatoa of Tubuai believed that he was descended from an ariki from the island of Raiatea. The American archaeologist Patrick Vinton Kirch has further suggested that the Austral Islands, the southern Cook Islands, and the Society Islands should be seen as one extended cultural family. New Zealand archaeologist Atholl John Anderson has argued similarly that the island of Rapa was settled around 1200 A.D.

At Atiahara, on the north coast of Tubuai, a near-beach settlement was excavated beginning in 1995 under the direction of American archaeologist Mark Eddowes, probably from a very early settlement phase. Food remains from the waste pits suggest that the inhabitants fed mainly on shellfish (fish, mussels, crustaceans) from the lagoon. Other food animals included pigs, chickens and Pacific rat.

The processing of mussel shells, probably also for the exchange of goods with other settlements, was an integral part of the economy. Dating of charcoal remains yielded dates of 1453 (±150 years) and 1113 (±50 years). According to the current state of research, an initial settlement of the Austral Islands can be assumed at the beginning of the second millennium AD.

After initial settlement in caves and rock ledges near the coast, a stratified tribal society developed rapidly in settlements near the beach. The structure of the settlements reflected the social order. There were strictly separate dwellings, built of perishable materials, for the aristocracy, the priests, the middle class (artisans, artists), warriors, adolescents and pubescent girls.

Due to increasing tribal warfare, the beach settlements were abandoned, probably in the seventeenth or eighteenth century. The inhabitants retreated to heavily fortified settlements in the inland hills, comparable to the Pā of New Zealand. On Rapa Island, for example, 15 such castles have been recorded.

The Norwegian archaeological expedition to Easter Island and the eastern Pacific in 1956, led by Thor Heyerdahl, determined an antiquity of between 200 and 300 years for a fortified settlement on Rapa's Morongo Uta hill and dated the Hatututi castle complex of Raivavae to 1700 AD. Numerous wars and probably also overexploitation of natural resources may have drastically reduced the population even before the arrival of Europeans.

=== European exploration and colonization ===
Rurutu was the first of the Austral Islands to be discovered by Europe in 1769. James Cook reached the island, which he named Ohetiroa, during his first voyage to the Pacific on August 14, 1769. After HMS Endeavour anchored off the island for the night, Cook launched the pinnace the next day under the command of Lieutenant Gore.

Naturalist Joseph Banks was also on the ship. A large number of armed warriors were walking along the shore. As Cook had ordered to avoid any risk, the Pinasse returned to the ship without having attempted a landing.

The Spaniard Tomás de Gayangos was the first European to reach the island of Raivavae on February 5, 1775, with the ships Águila and Júpiter as part of an expedition to Tahiti initiated by Manuel de Amat y Junyent. The next day Gayangos had a ship leave Tahiti with Lieutenant Benarcosi and two translators, but they were prevented from landing in Mahanatoa Bay by several war canoes.

James Cook discovered the island of Tubuai in March 1777 during his third voyage, but also failed to set foot on the island. His report was known to Fletcher Christian, the leader of the mutineers on HMS Bounty. After the mutiny of the Bounty on April 28, 1789, off Tofua, the ship first headed for Tubuai, but only stayed there for a week before sailing for Tahiti. Armed with provisions and several Tahitian women, the mutineers returned to Tubuai to settle. However, internal disputes and bloody clashes with the islanders, in which 66 Tubuans were killed, caused the Bounty to depart only three months later.

Rapa Iti was discovered in 1791 by George Vancouver, Marotiri in 1800 by George Bass, Rimatara in 1811 by British Tahitian sandalwood trader Samuel Pinder Henry, and Maria Atoll was finally discovered for the Western Hemisphere in 1824 by Nantucket whaling captain George Washington Gardner.

After the Pomaré dynasty consolidated its rule in Tahiti with British support and Pomaré II was crowned king in 1819, it decided to extend its sphere of influence to the Austral Islands. Captain Lewis' American brig brought the king, his court and several missionaries from the London Missionary Society (LMS) to the Austral Islands in October 1819. Lewis was rewarded with Raivavae sandalwood. The clans were engaged in one of their usual tribal wars. Pomaré managed to mediate between the warring parties and resolve the conflict diplomatically.

He left as governor one of his Tahitian chiefs, who prepared the ground for the LMS Protestant missionaries who followed from Moorea a year later. The conversion to Christianity was peaceful, as the chiefs assimilated the new religion quickly and without resistance. Christianization put an end to tribal warfare, but brought about decisive changes in the stratified tribal society. The omnipotence of the tribal leaders had been broken. The Austral Islands initially remained under Tahitian hegemony.

In 1862, a two-year incursion of the so-called "Blackbirders" began, who took more than 3500 South Pacific islanders to Peru and Chile as slave labor. In December 1862, a fleet of five ships anchored in Rapa's Ahurei Bay. A strong group of armed men was put ashore to capture workers by force. But the inhabitants retreated to the mountain forts and the occupants had to leave without having achieved anything. A few days later, the Chilean schooner Cora arrived at Rapa. Thirteen chiefs met and decided to capture the ship and crew and hand them over to the French authorities in Tahiti. A group of warriors sneaked aboard the Cora and seized the captain. The crew surrendered without resistance. Five sailors decided to stay on the island as guests. A subsequent attempt by the barque Misti to capture the work was abandoned when the captain learned of the Cora's fate.

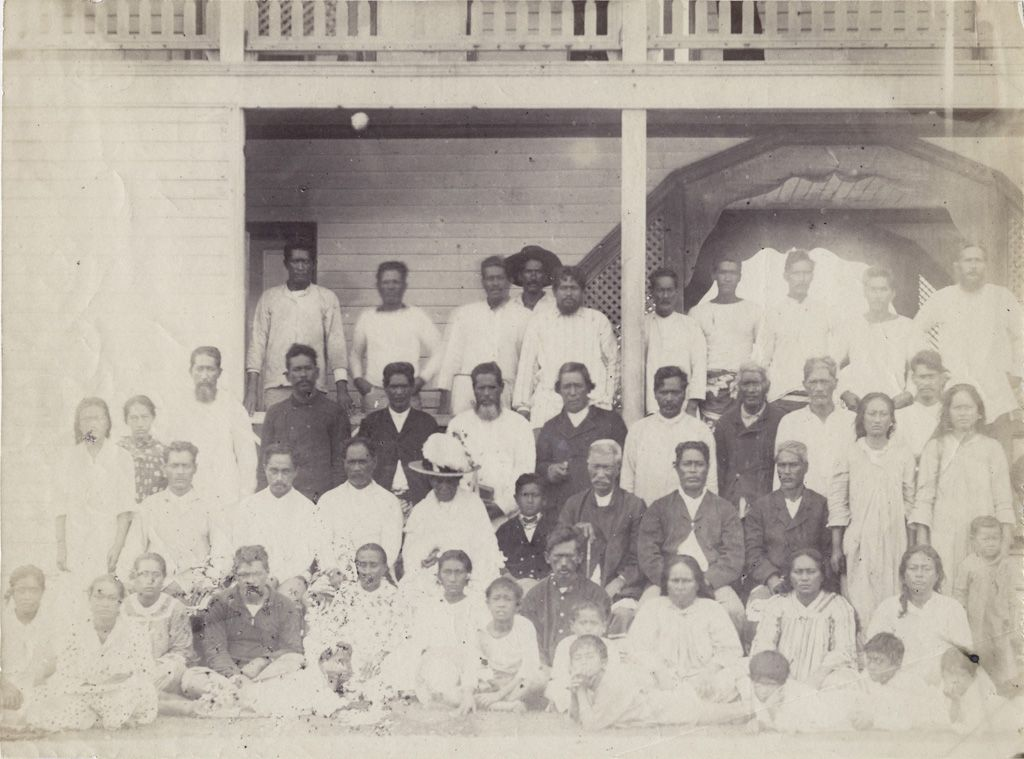
Royal family and chiefs of Rurutu. The young king, the regent, group of chiefs and inhabitants of Rurutu, 1889.

Queen Pomaré IV of Tahiti ceded part of her sovereignty to France. As a result, France formally declared a protectorate over Tubuai in 1874 and Raivavae in 1876. With the end of the Pomaré dynasty-the last king of Tahiti was Pomaré V-the islands were annexed in 1880 and became a French colony. One exception was two small islands that the colonial powers of France and Britain had apparently overlooked. Rurutu, under King Teuruarii IV, and Rimatara, under Queen Tamaeva IV, initially remained independent kingdoms. After an exchange of diplomatic notes and after Britain expressed no interest in the islands, Rurutu came under French suzerainty on March 27, 1889, and Rimatara on March 29, 1889, The final annexation took place in 1900, Rimatara and Rurutu also became French colonies.

== Geography ==
The Tuha'a Pae or Austral Islands (French: Îles Australes or Archipel des Australes) are the southernmost group of islands in French Polynesia, an overseas collectivity of France in the South Pacific. Geographically, the Austral Islands consist of two separate archipelagos. From northwest to southeast they are:

- The Tupua'i Islands (French: Îles Tubuaï), named for one of the main islands. They consist of:
  - Îles Maria (21°48′00″S 154°41′00″W) in the northwest, part of Rimatara municipality
  - Rimatara (22°38′25″S 152°50′16″W),
  - Rūrutu (22°29′04″S 151°20′03″W),
  - Tupua'i (23°23′00″S 149°27′00″W),
  - Ra'ivāvae (23°52′00″S 147°40′00″W),
- The Bass Islands (French: Îles Bass) comprise:
  - the main island of Rapa Iti (27°35′00″S 144°20′00″W),
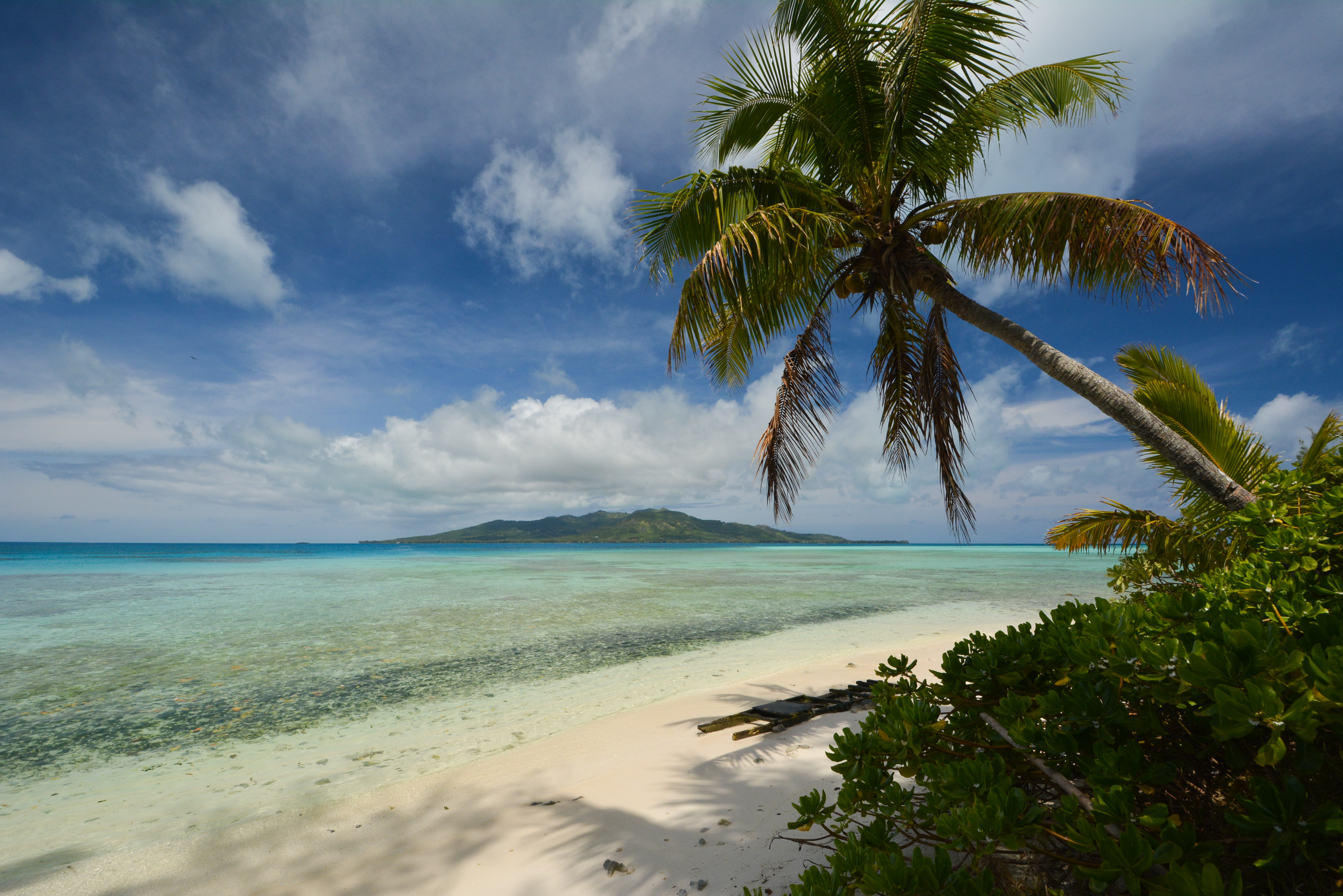
    Tubuai, Austral Islands.
  - the small Marotiri island (27°55′00″S 143°26′00″W) in the southeast, part of Rapa municipality

The islands of Maria and Marotiri are not suitable for sustained habitation. Several of the islands have uninhabited islets or rocks off their coastlines.

The chain is associated with the Macdonald hotspot. The only active volcano is the Macdonald seamount (40m depth).

In administrative terms, the Austral Islands (including the Bass Islands) constitute an administrative subdivision, the Tuha'a Pae or Austral Islands (subdivision administrative des (Îles) Australes), one of French Polynesia's five administrative subdivisions (subdivision administratives). Geographically, the administrative subdivision of the Austral Islands is identical with the constituency of the Austral Islands (circonscription des Îles Australes), one of French Polynesia's six constituencies (circonscriptions électorales) for the Assembly of French Polynesia.

The capital of the Austral Islands administrative subdivision is Tupua'i.

=== Geology ===
The Austral Islands form a chain of seven islands extending from southeast to northwest. They are the product of a hot spot beneath the still active Macdonald seamount, which rises 338 kilometers east-southeast of Bass Rocks (Marotori) to about 40 meters below sea level. The geologically oldest, more eroded and fractured islands are in the northwest, the younger ones in the southeast of the chain. The geological age of the basaltic rocks ranges from 28.6 million years on Rimatara in the northwest to 3.3 million years on Marotiri in the southeast.

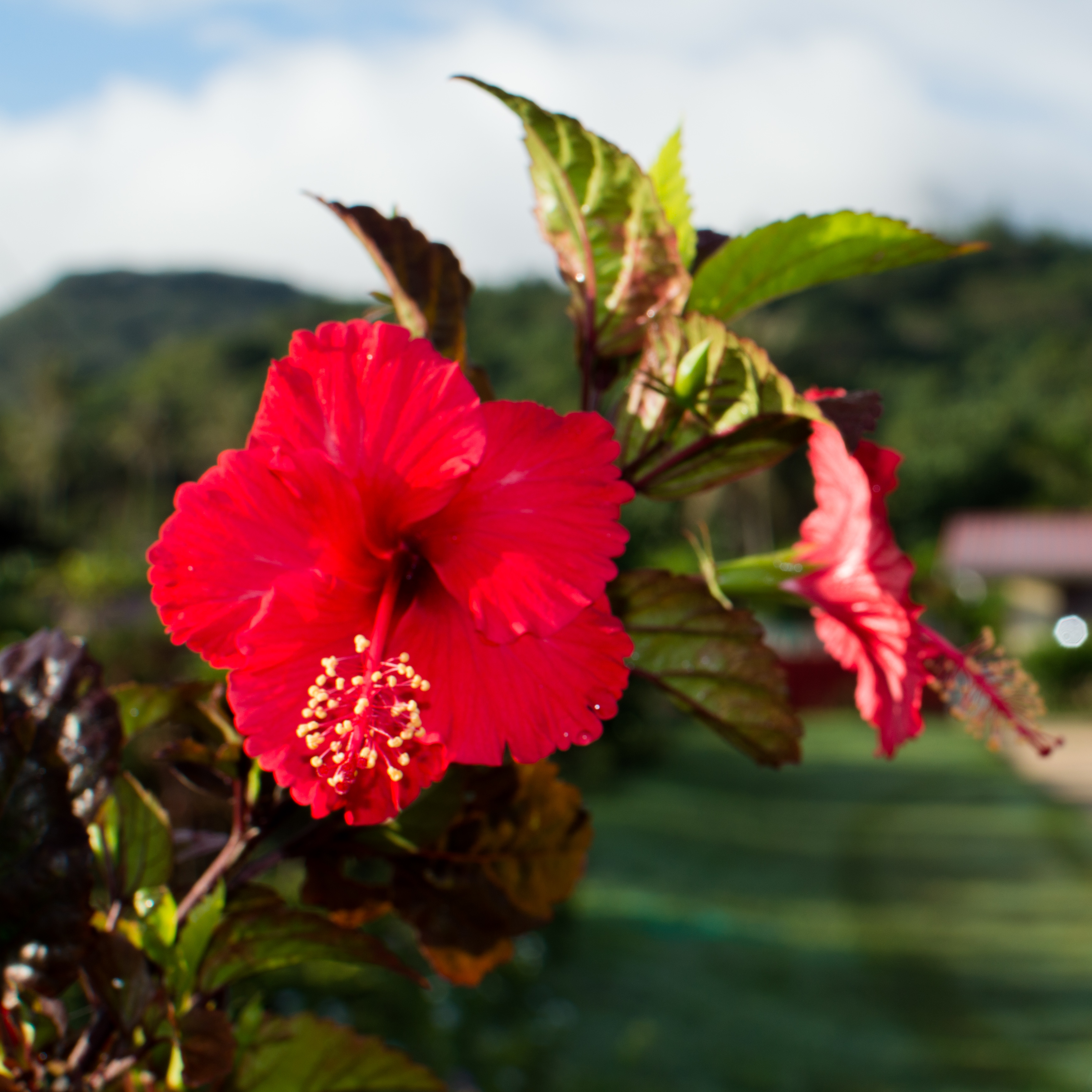
Hibiscus rosa-sinensis in the Austral Islands

Marotiri, the youngest island, is merely a group of rugged volcanic rocks with no protective coral reef. Maria, on the other hand, the oldest, is an atoll whose volcanic central island sank into the sea long ago, leaving only four motus. The remaining islands are classic atolls with a central island, a coral reef and a fringe of coral islands in the various stages of development.

=== Climate ===
The northern Tupua'i islands have a tropical rainforest climate (Af according to the Köppen climate classification, Arab according to the Trewartha climate classification), but relatively cool compared to the Polynesian islands further north, as the Tupua'i islands are around the Tropic of Capricorn. Summers are hot and muggy, with an abundance of precipitation caused by thunderstorms from easterly winds. In addition, the islands can be affected by cyclones in the austral summer (between November and April). Winters are warm and humid, with easterly winds still creating high precipitation amounts. Far from any landmasses, the Tupua'i islands have a low absolute temperature range – a record high of 32.7 °C (90.9 °F) in March and a record low of 9.2 °C (48.6 °F) in August.

Climate data for Tubuai (1981−2010 normals, extremes 1948−2014)
Month	Jan	Feb	Mar	Apr	May	Jun	Jul	Aug	Sep	Oct	Nov	Dec	Year
Record high °C (°F)	32.0 (89.6)	32.0 (89.6)	32.7 (90.9)	32.3 (90.1)	32.0 (89.6)	31.0 (87.8)	30.0 (86.0)	30.0 (86.0)	29.0 (84.2)	30.0 (86.0)	30.0 (86.0)	32.0 (89.6)	32.7 (90.9)
Mean daily maximum °C (°F)	28.0 (82.4)	28.6 (83.5)	28.6 (83.5)	27.4 (81.3)	25.8 (78.4)	24.4 (75.9)	23.9 (75.0)	23.7 (74.7)	23.9 (75.0)	24.7 (76.5)	25.9 (78.6)	26.9 (80.4)	26.0 (78.8)
Daily mean °C (°F)	25.7 (78.3)	26.2 (79.2)	26.0 (78.8)	24.9 (76.8)	23.2 (73.8)	21.7 (71.1)	21.2 (70.2)	21.0 (69.8)	21.1 (70.0)	22.1 (71.8)	23.4 (74.1)	24.5 (76.1)	23.4 (74.2)
Mean daily minimum °C (°F)	23.3 (73.9)	23.7 (74.7)	23.4 (74.1)	22.3 (72.1)	20.7 (69.3)	19.0 (66.2)	18.6 (65.5)	18.3 (64.9)	18.4 (65.1)	19.5 (67.1)	20.8 (69.4)	22.0 (71.6)	20.8 (69.5)
Record low °C (°F)	14.5 (58.1)	15.5 (59.9)	15.8 (60.4)	14.6 (58.3)	10.0 (50.0)	10.0 (50.0)	10.0 (50.0)	9.2 (48.6)	10.3 (50.5)	10.7 (51.3)	12.0 (53.6)	14.3 (57.7)	9.2 (48.6)
Average precipitation mm (inches)	194.4 (7.65)	192.4 (7.57)	176.3 (6.94)	165.3 (6.51)	153.3 (6.04)	119.0 (4.69)	136.0 (5.35)	133.4 (5.25)	104.8 (4.13)	116.5 (4.59)	133.9 (5.27)	200.4 (7.89)	1,825.7 (71.88)
Average precipitation days (≥ 1.0 mm)	13.2	12.9	13.3	12.5	12.4	11.4	11.2	11.3	9.6	9.9	10.2	13.2	141.1
Mean monthly sunshine hours	—	—	204.9	175.6	158.6	141.6	165.5	165.0	—	—	199.9	177.0	—
Source: Météo-France

The southern Bass Islands have a have a tropical rainforest climate (Af in the Köppen climate classification, Arab in the Trewartha climate classification), bordering on a very-mild winter humid subtropical climate (Cfa in the Köppen climate classification, Cfal in the Trewartha climate classification). Despite being situated south of the Tropic of Capricorn, the remote location in the middle of a tropical ocean enables the climate to be moderated in all seasons. Summers and winters are slightly cooler than in the Tupua'i Islands, and cyclones are rarer, as the islands are located near the Horse Latitudes at thirty degrees south. Precipitation is abundant in all seasons, and sunshine is uncommon every month of the year. The cool winters and strong winds prohibit ultra tropical fruits such as coconuts to thrive, as it has dropped to 8.5 °C (47.3 °F) in September.

Climate data for Rapa, French Polynesia, 1981–2010 normals, extremes 1951–present
Month	Jan	Feb	Mar	Apr	May	Jun	Jul	Aug	Sep	Oct	Nov	Dec	Year
Record high °C (°F)	31.0 (87.8)	30.9 (87.6)	31.6 (88.9)	30.3 (86.5)	28.1 (82.6)	26.3 (79.3)	24.7 (76.5)	25.0 (77.0)	26.4 (79.5)	26.4 (79.5)	28.9 (84.0)	30.1 (86.2)	31.6 (88.9)
Mean daily maximum °C (°F)	25.7 (78.3)	26.4 (79.5)	26.1 (79.0)	24.5 (76.1)	22.9 (73.2)	21.4 (70.5)	20.7 (69.3)	20.4 (68.7)	20.4 (68.7)	21.4 (70.5)	22.7 (72.9)	24.0 (75.2)	23.0 (73.4)
Daily mean °C (°F)	23.7 (74.7)	24.4 (75.9)	23.9 (75.0)	22.4 (72.3)	20.8 (69.4)	19.1 (66.4)	18.4 (65.1)	18.1 (64.6)	18.1 (64.6)	19.2 (66.6)	20.6 (69.1)	21.9 (71.4)	20.9 (69.6)
Mean daily minimum °C (°F)	21.7 (71.1)	22.3 (72.1)	21.7 (71.1)	20.2 (68.4)	18.6 (65.5)	16.8 (62.2)	16.2 (61.2)	15.8 (60.4)	15.8 (60.4)	16.9 (62.4)	18.5 (65.3)	19.9 (67.8)	18.7 (65.7)
Record low °C (°F)	12.2 (54.0)	15.6 (60.1)	15.2 (59.4)	13.5 (56.3)	10.1 (50.2)	10.2 (50.4)	9.8 (49.6)	8.9 (48.0)	8.5 (47.3)	10.5 (50.9)	12.0 (53.6)	13.2 (55.8)	8.5 (47.3)
Average precipitation mm (inches)	229.4 (9.03)	186.9 (7.36)	275.8 (10.86)	251.4 (9.90)	185.0 (7.28)	208.7 (8.22)	258.4 (10.17)	237.8 (9.36)	165.1 (6.50)	184.1 (7.25)	170.6 (6.72)	221.4 (8.72)	2,574.6 (101.36)
Average precipitation days (≥ 1 mm)	13.2	12.5	15.3	14.9	14.5	15.7	15.4	15.5	12.7	12.2	11.8	12.7	166.4
Mean monthly sunshine hours	128.9	130.3	129.1	107.7	96.6	78.9	95.0	—	104.1	119.1	129.3	119.6	—
Source: Meteo France

== Ecology ==
The Austral islands constitute the Tubuai tropical moist forests terrestrial ecoregion. The natural vegetation consisted of lowland and montane rain forests. Much of the original forest has been mostly cleared for pasture and agriculture. The islands are home to several endemic plants and animals, including the Rimatara reed warbler (Acrocephalus rimatarae), Rapa fruit-dove (Ptilonopus huttoni), and Kuhl's lorikeet (Vini kuhli).

Most of the islands are surrounded by coral reefs. The islands constitute a distinct marine ecoregion.

=== Vegetation ===
The flora of the Austral Islands has already been modified mainly by the Polynesian aborigines. On the uninhabited Maria Atoll, ancient, largely undestroyed native vegetation can be found. On Rapa, too, there are still small remnants of the original montane rainforest in inaccessible steep areas.

On the four larger islands (Rapa, Raivavae, Tubuai and Rurutu) the vegetation is dominated by secondary growth. Beach vegetation differs little from that of other Pacific island groups, but is less species-rich. In the few areas undisturbed by man, Pisonia grandis palm, heliotropes of the species Heliotropium arboreum (synonyms: Argusia argentea, Tournefortia argentea) and Pandanus tectorius predominate, with shrubby and creeping plants in the understory.

At lower elevations, outside of cultivated areas, there are thickets of Hibiscus tiliaceus. Guava (Psidium guajava), probably introduced by Europeans, has also spread widely and forms extensive tangled stands up to middle elevations. However, large areas have been damaged by previous slash-and-burn and goat grazing, and open grasslands have formed with few low-growing trees. Dense stands of ferns have established in the narrow, moist crevices. The higher elevations in the lee of the mountains are arid in places.

== Economy ==
The inhabitants of the Austral Islands live mainly from subsistence agriculture. The very fertile soils and the warm and humid climate make it possible to grow vegetables, tubers (taro and yams) and tropical and subtropical fruits. The products are mainly consumed by the farmers themselves, and small surpluses are exported to Tahiti. In addition, fishing and livestock (chickens and pigs) are raised for local consumption. Some copra, coffee in small quantities (Raivavae and Rurutu) and vanilla (Rurutu) are grown for export.

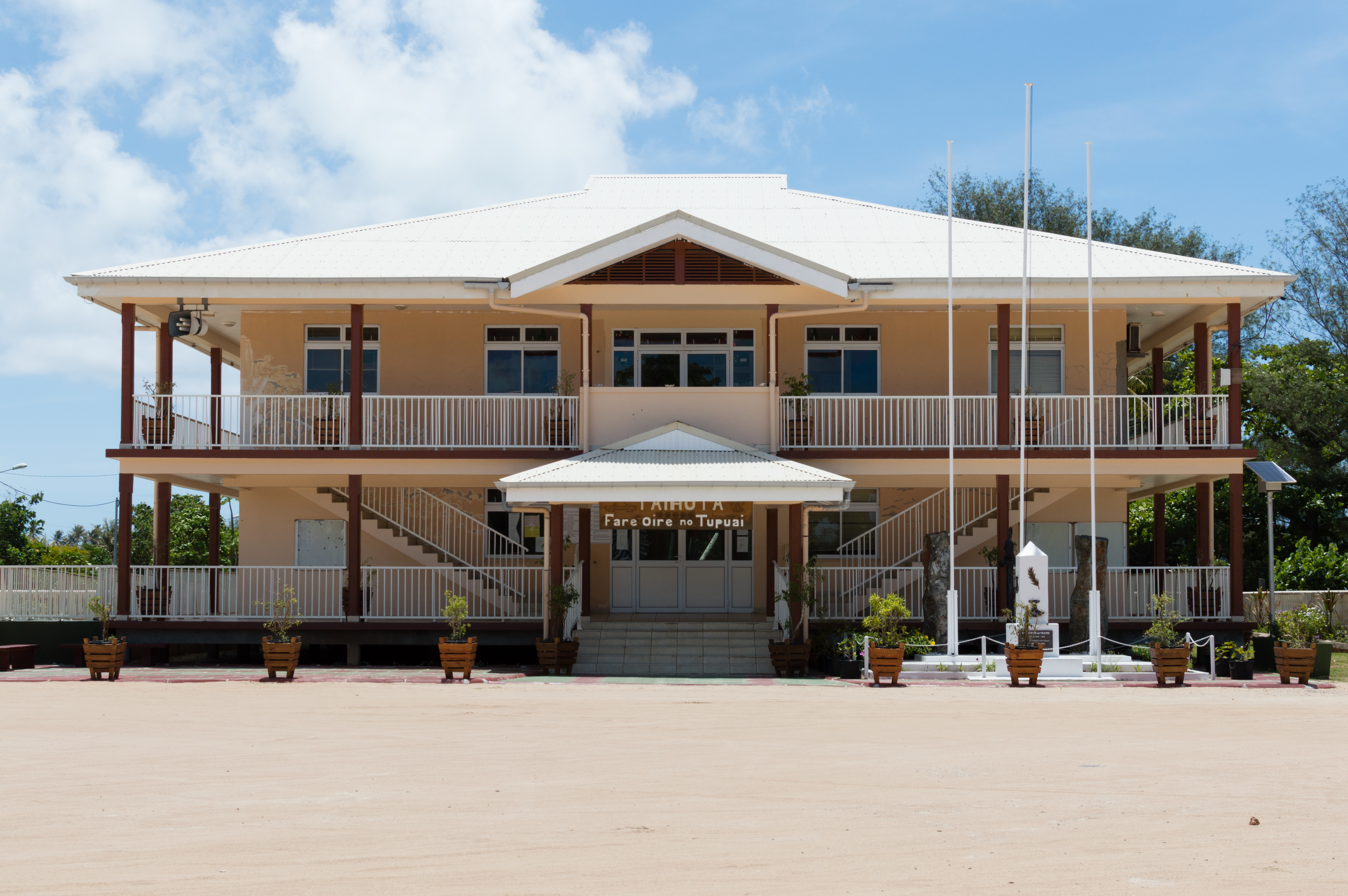
Tubuai City Hall

Tourism has barely touched the islands so far, and the tourist infrastructure is still underdeveloped. The islands can be reached by regular supply boat from Tahiti and by light aircraft from Tahiti-Faa'a airport. There are airfields at Rurutu, Tubuai, Raivavae and Rimatara. The currency is (still) the CFP franc, which is pegged to the euro. The administrative budget of the Austral Islands is largely financed by France and the EU.

== Politics and government ==
Politically, the Austral Islands today belong to French Polynesia (Pays d'outre-mer – POM) and are therefore affiliated with the EU. They are administered by a subdivision (Subdivision administrative des Îles Australes) of the High Commissariat of the Republic in French Polynesia (Haut-commissariat de la République en Polynésie française) in Papeete, on the island of Tahiti.

The archipelago is politically divided into 5 municipalities (Communes des Îles Australes), which administer themselves.

== Demographics ==
The 6,820 inhabitants (2012 census) live mainly in small villages; there are no large cities in the Austral Islands. Unlike other regions of Polynesia, the population of the Austral Islands has declined since the mid-1990s. The reason is the high migration of young people from the isolated archipelago to other parts of Polynesia or to France for their better job prospects.

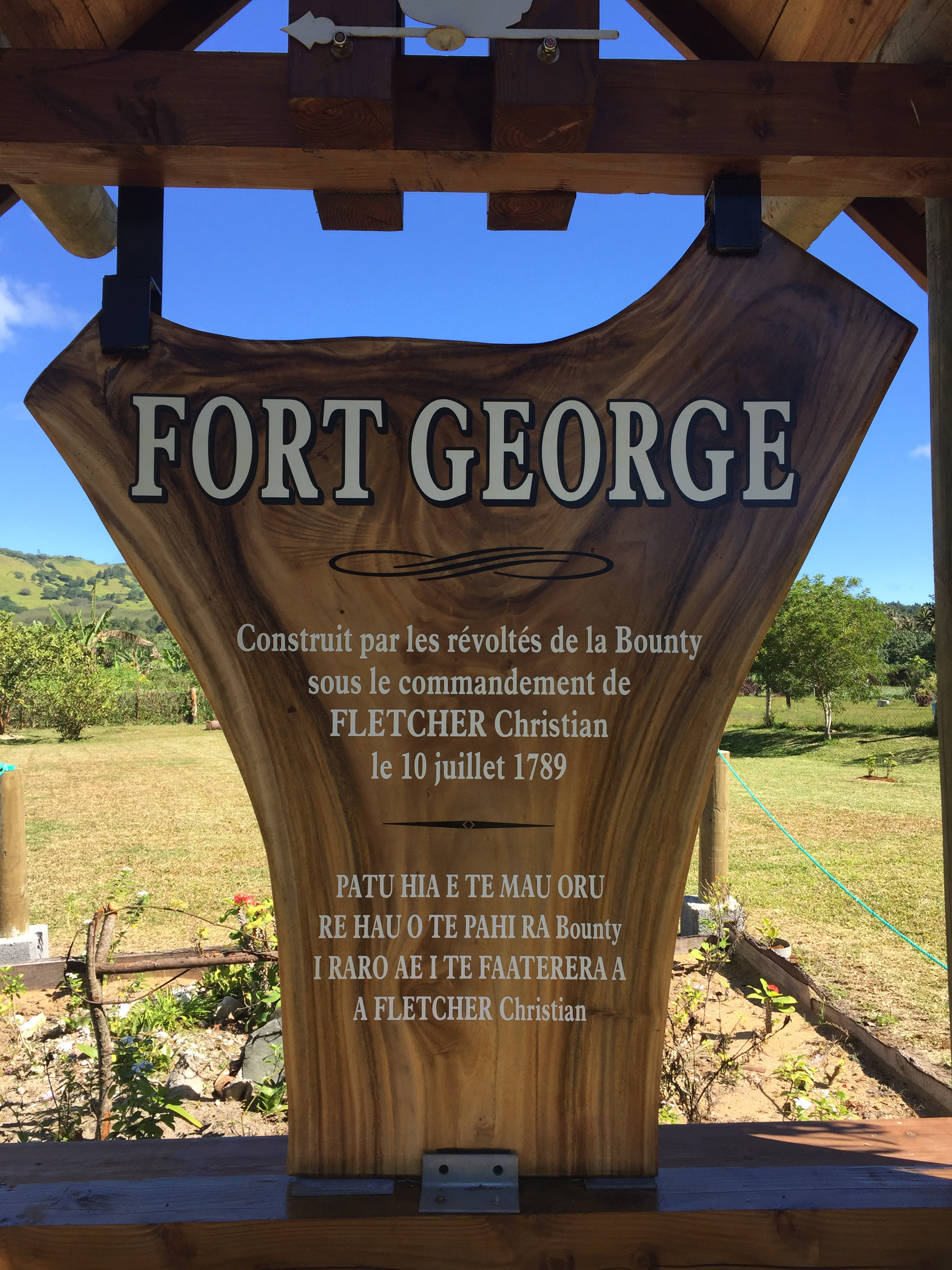
Notice written in French in the old Fort George

=== Religion ===
The majority of the population is Christian mostly belonging to various Protestant groups and the Catholic Church. There are four Catholic churches under the Archdiocese of Papeete: two on Tubuai Island – the Church of Mary and the Church of Saint Joseph (Église de Maria no te Hau; Église de Saint-Joseph) – one on Rurutu Island – the Church of Saint Francis Regis (Église de Saint-François-Régis) – and one on Raivavae Island – the Church of Saint Peter (Église de Saint-Pierre). According to 1991 data, Protestant Christian groups represent the majority on these islands.

=== Languages ===
The official language, as in the rest of France, is French. In everyday life, the Austral language, which belongs to the Polynesian languages, is often spoken, but with a tendency to decline. On Rapa Iti island, Rapa language is also spoken.

== Culture ==
The traces of culture originating from the Austral Islands are quite numerous and the works of art produced there have often been judged as the most remarkable produced in Polynesia However, almost none of these works can be found on these islands but in renowned museums in Western countries.

Indeed, passing ships received numerous offerings but also plundered some of the islands' sites, notably the missionaries of the London Missionary Society, anxious to eradicate all traces of ancient worship. The marae, Polynesian places of worship, were thus excavated and gradually disappeared. In Raivavae, for example, out of sixty-two marae present at the beginning of the 20th century, only twenty-three remain visible today.

The best known work of art from the Austral Islands is certainly the sculpture of the God A'a, discovered in Rurutu and currently exhibited at the British Museum in London. There is a reproduction on the island. It is composed of thirty small figures sculpted on its body; its back had a cavity that could accommodate twenty-four other small sculptures which were however destroyed in 1822.

The Austral Islands are also known for their large vertical drums or "pahu" often decorated with human figures that often welcomed Christian explorers or missionaries.

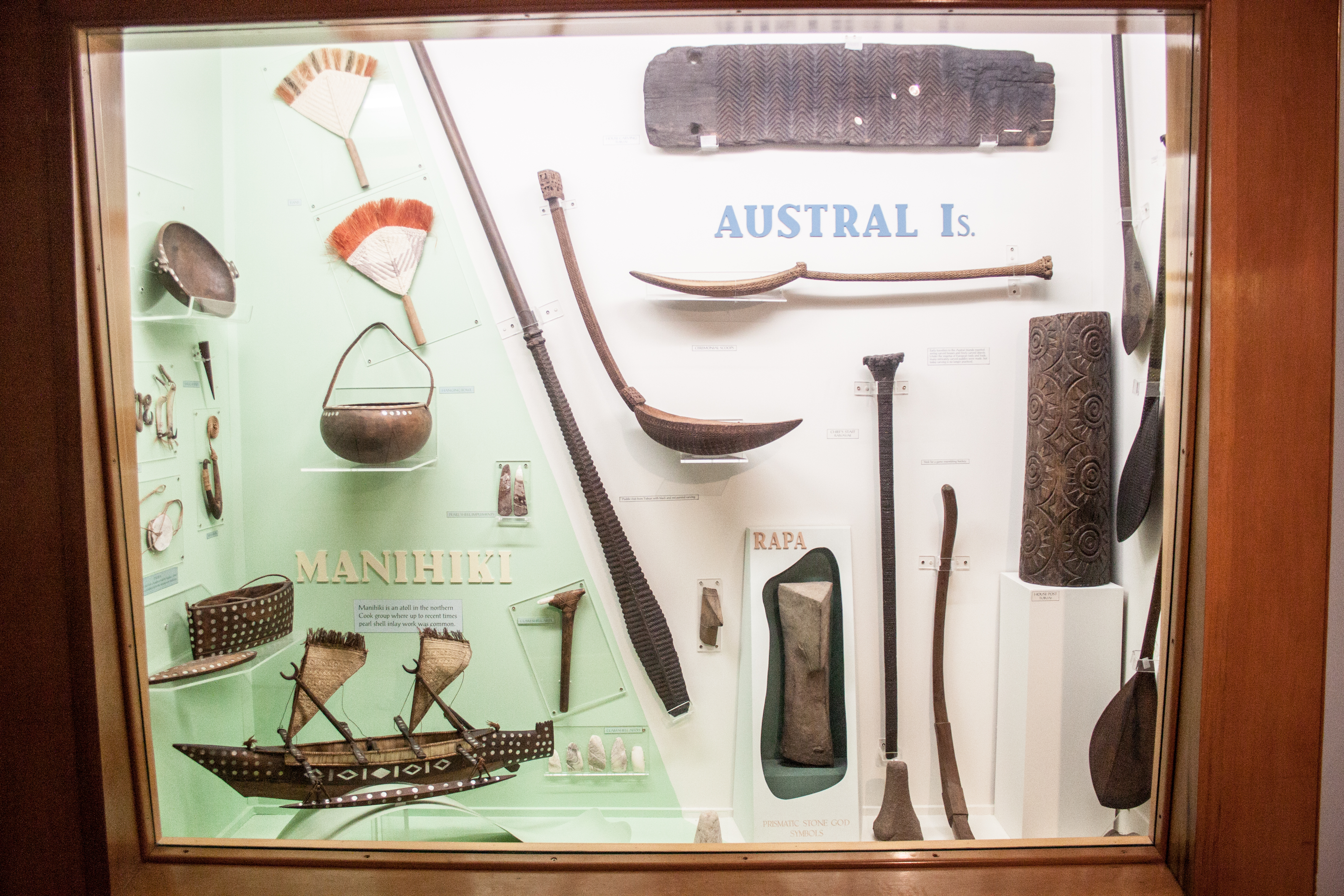
Display of objects from Austral Islands

Numerous other figures carved in wood or even in stone for the marae, carved wooden fly swatters generally with anthropomorphic figures, sometimes even with ivory handles, large decorated spoons as well as highly decorated bowls have been found in the archipelago. Overall, these works are finely decorated with great complexity and often with anthropomorphic figures.

Other objects used to dress the people or personalities of the islands have been discovered, such as elaborate hairstyles as well as large crowns and necklaces of hair or feathers with shell or ivory pendants.

== See also ==
- French overseas departments and territories
- Administrative divisions of France
- Islands controlled by France in the Indian and Pacific oceans
- List of islands of France
- Politics of French Polynesia
