= Rapa fruit dove =

Conservation status
- Critically Endangered (IUCN 3.1)

Scientific classification
- Kingdom: Animalia
- Phylum: Chordata
- Class: Aves
- Order: Columbiformes
- Family: Columbidae
- Genus: Ptilinopus
- Species: P. huttoni

Binomial name
- Ptilinopus huttoni Finsch, 1874

Species of bird

The Rapa fruit dove (Ptilinopus huttoni) is a species of bird in the family Columbidae, which includes pigeons and doves. It is endemic to the island of Rapa Iti in French Polynesia. The species was classified as Critically Endangered by the IUCN Red List in 2018 because of its small population and predicted continued decline. The Rapa fruit dove primarily feeds on fleshy fruit. Its natural habitat is subtropical or tropical moist lowland forests and it has an extent of 30 square kilometres (12 sq mi). It is threatened by habitat loss due to deforestation and invasive species. Effective land protection and management could increase the quality of habitat for the species. Additional research into population dynamics and the impact of threats to the species can give a better understanding of the conservation practices needed.

== Description and range ==
The Rapa fruit dove is approximately 31 centimetres (12 in) tall, making it a medium-sized dove. It is a colorful bird, with mostly green plumage, especially on its wings. Its foreparts (head, neck, chest, upper back) have blue-gray plumage. It has a yellow lower belly with a rose-purple band below its chest feathers. A distinguishing feature of the Rapa fruit dove is its bright pink crown, located on the face between the eyes.

This species is endemic to the small island of Rapa Iti in the Austral Islands of French Polynesia and has an estimated extent of 30 square kilometres (12 sq mi). The population was estimated at 160 individuals in 2017, with all individuals in one subpopulation. Surveys carried out in 1989-1990 found a population of approximately 274, resulting in a 42% decline in population between the two surveys.

== Ecology ==
The Rapa fruit dove lives in the remaining undisturbed forest fragments on the island and prefers an elevation between 40 – 450 meters. Rapa Iti has a tropical climate and the dove can be found in the moist lowland forests. They prefer the most wooded areas but can occasionally be found in the Caribbean pine plantations.

As indicated by their name, the Rapa fruit dove primarily feeds on fleshy fruit from the various trees on the island, as well as nectar from some flowers. There are many productive native berry trees on Rapa Iti to sustain the dove. While the strawberry guava is an invasive species and a cause for habitat decline, it is possible that it is also a source of food for the dove. They eat while perched in the tree and pick or reach for the fruit. Since they are heavier than some other fruit doves, the Rapa fruit dove does not move out to the end of the branches, and instead must perform many contortions to reach the fruit.

== Conservation threats to habitat ==
The Rapa fruit dove's decreasing population size is caused by habitat loss. It lives in the forests of Rapa Iti, but very little of the island's original native forests remain. The destruction of the habitat was caused by logging, fires, and an increased need for grazing land for cattle and goats. The quality of the remaining habitat has diminished since the introduction of the invasive strawberry guava from South America. When left unchecked, the strawberry guava can grow uncontrollably in dense thickets and wreak havoc on ecosystems, choking out native species that the fruit dove relies on. Other invasive species, like feral cats, predate on the fruit doves and have been a factor in their decline.

== Use and trade ==
Historically, the Rapa fruit dove was hunted for food by the indigenous Polynesians. But an improvement in the standard of living on the island had ceased the hunting of the doves. Currently, they are not used for human benefit.

== Conservation action in place ==
While there are no plans for conservation efforts to directly increase the population of the Rapa fruit dove, the necessity of habitat conservation and restoration has recently become recognized on the island. In 2017, a project began with the goal of restoring the forests, controlling the growth of the strawberry guava, and controlling the populations of grazing animals.

== Conservation/research needed ==
Additional conservation efforts are needed to protect the Rapa fruit dove and the rest of the biodiversity on Rapa Iti. Ecological impacts due to humans are the main cause of declines and extinctions of birds in the Polynesian islands, especially Rapa Iti. More land needs to be effectively protected and managed to decrease grazing pressures and exclude fires from upland areas. There also needs to be increased control of invasive species populations. To directly increase the population of the fruit dove, an introduction to another island to establish a second population is recommended after the introduced mammals are eradicated from the islands. There is also the option of establishing a captive population of fruit doves as a precaution. Education and awareness are needed for the local community to gain their support for creating protected land areas.

Further research into the actual impacts of the threats to the Rapa fruit dove is needed. It is unknown how feral cats are affecting the population of the fruit dove, and if its predation is a serious problem for their survival. It is also unclear how the Rapa fruit dove uses the strawberry guava, if at all. Additional research into these factors can give a better understanding of the population trends of the fruit dove and help guide conservation practices on the island.
