= Marotiri =

Southeasternmost of the Austral Islands, French Polynesia

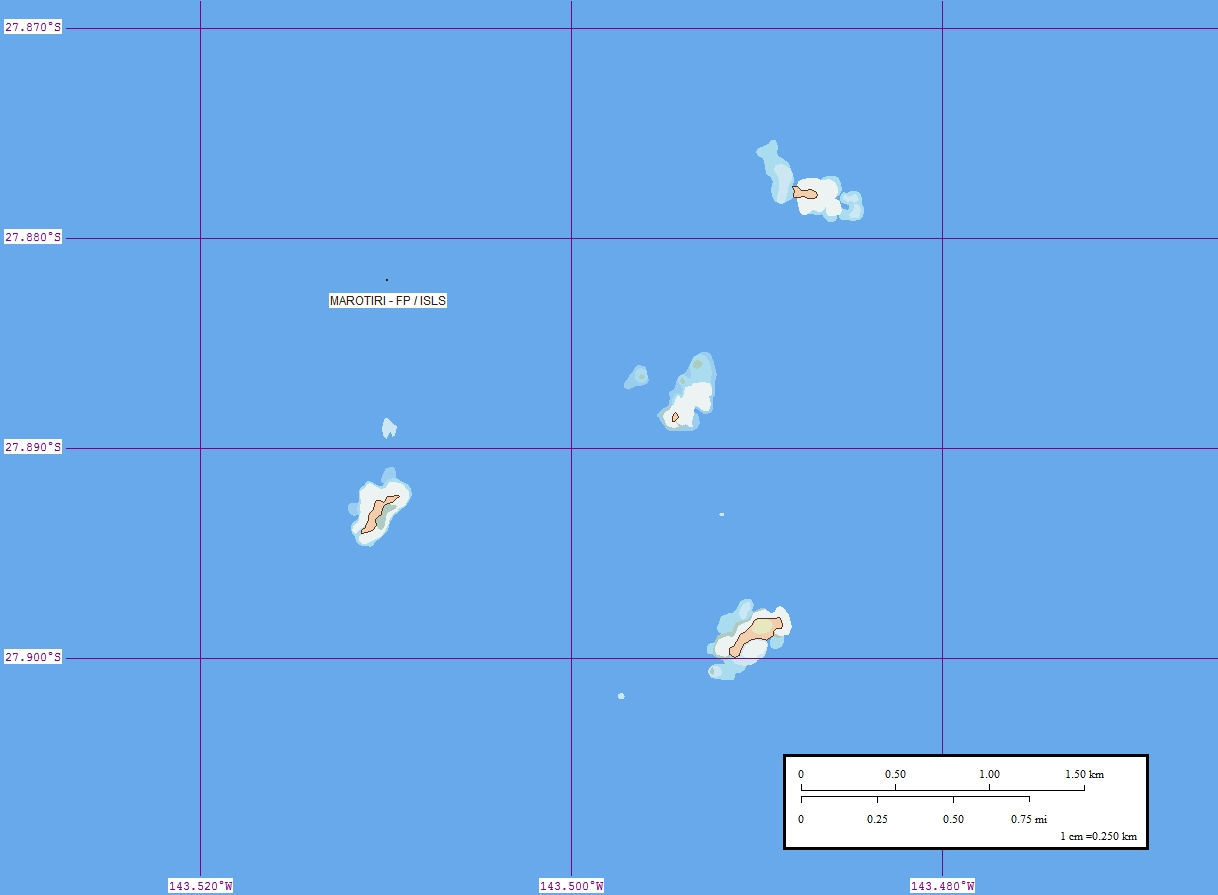
- Marotiri or Bass Rocks

- Location within French Polynesia Location within Oceania Location within Pacific Ocean

Geography
- Location: Pacific Ocean
- Coordinates: 27°55′S 143°26′W
- Archipelago: Australes
- Total islands: 4
- Area: 0.0431 km^{2} (0.0166 sq mi)
- Highest elevation: 113 m (371 ft)
- Highest point: Southern Rock

Administration
- France
- Overseas collectivity: French Polynesia
- Administrative subdivision: Austral Islands
- Commune: Rapa

Demographics
- Population: Uninhabited (2012)

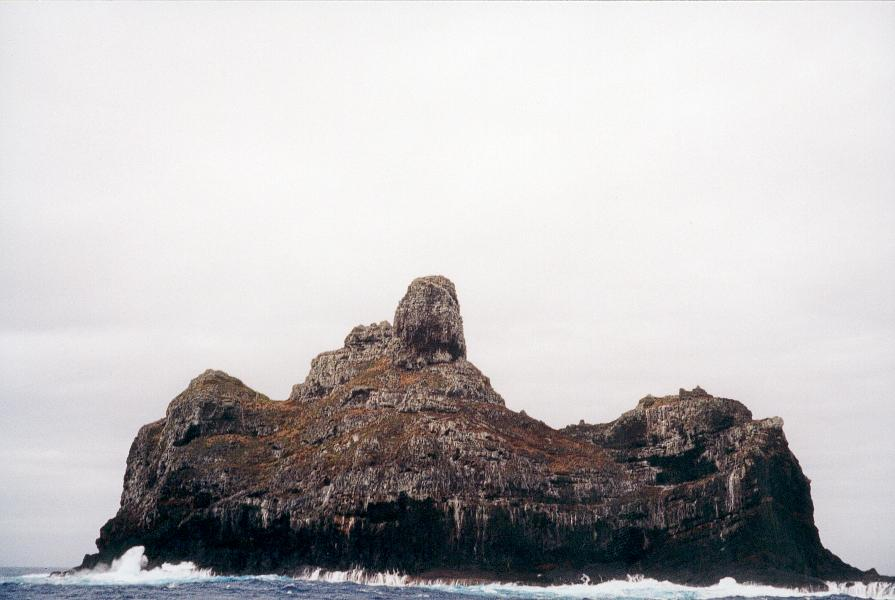
Southern rock of Marotiri

Marotiri is a group of four uninhabited volcanic rocks protruding from the sea (and several submerged rocks), forming the southeastern end of the Austral Islands of French Polynesia. Marotiri is also known as Bass Rocks (Îlots de Bass in French), after the European explorer George Bass who discovered them in either late 1801 or early 1802 but whom had since erroneously deemed them the long lost Four Crowns of Quiros:

“ Sailing North for Tahiti I found The 4 Crowns of Quiros, placed on the modern charts. I found their position to be 14 leagues E.S.E of Oparo [Rapa Iti, SD]. Of all discoveries this one gave me the most pleasure as it serves to redeem the name of a great Navigator from the infamy of having been called a liar. It is true that these 14 leagues do not correspond with Quiros's said 4 league distance but I think this to have been on account of a copy error by the one who transferred his manuscript and that 4 should have been 14. This is why Vancouver’s Oparo is the San Miquel of Quiros. When I saw the rocks and the island to the West I had no idea that the last one was Oparo, because having run a lot of sea by this time and not expecting to find myself to be close to it I thought both rocks and island to be discoveries. But having had the fortune to observe both latitude and longitude to be in accordance with Vancouver’s Oparo [...] I do not doubt it to be the same island.”

Marotiri is very isolated, located about 1,167 km (725 mi) west-south-westward of Pitcairn Island. The closest island is Rapa Iti, 75 km farther northwest, but separated from it by an ocean depth of more than 1,500 meters. The rocks are part of the municipality of Rapa.

The climate is wet temperate. The lower rocks are almost devoid of vegetation - although there is some vegetation on the upper slopes and summits. They are important as a seabird rookery. Fish abound in the adjacent waters. The rocks emerge from a submarine platform 100 meters deep and 5 km in diameter. They lie at a distance between 1.5 and 3 km from one another. The total land area is 43,100 m^{2}, which is broken down as follows by the individual rocks:

Rock	Area (m^{2})
Northern Rock	5,800
Central Rock	1,800
Southern Rock	22,400
Western Rock	13,100
Marotiri	43,100

The southern rock is the largest, with a height of 113 meters at its highest point.
