= Austral language =

Language of French Polynesia

Austral
- Reo Tuha‘a pae
- Native to: French Polynesia
- Region: Austral Islands
- Ethnicity: 6,700 (2017)
- Native speakers: 5,000 (2007 census); L2 speakers: 2,000 (no date)
- Language family: Austronesian: Malayo-Polynesian; Oceanic; Polynesian; Eastern Polynesian; Tahitic; Austral

Language codes
- ISO 639-3: aut
- Glottolog: aust1304
- ELP: Austral
- Austral dialects are classified as Definitely Endangered by the UNESCO Atlas of the World's Languages in Danger.

Austral (Reo Tuha‘a pae) is an endangered Polynesian language or a dialect continuum that was spoken by approximately 8,000 people in 1987 on the Austral Islands and the Society Islands of French Polynesia. The language is also referred to as Tubuai-Rurutu, Tubuai, Rurutu-Tupuaʻi, or Tupuaʻi. It is closely related to other Tahitic languages, most notably Tahitian and Māori.

== History ==
Those who originally spoke Austral were the Tubuaians, the people of Tubuai. The island has been inhabited since at least 1215CE.

The first European to visit Tubuai was James Cook in 1777, though he did not land. The next Europeans to arrive were the mutineers of HMS Bounty in 1789. After establishing a fort, the mutineers degenerated into raiding local villages to kidnap women, and left after two months. Mutineer James Morrison recorded the population of Tubuai as "3000 souls". When Christian missionaries arrived thirty years later, the population had been reduced to just 300 people. One Protestant minister when visiting a congregation on Tubuai on January 3, 1824, wrote that several islanders were still suffering from a devastating illness. He described the symptoms and noted that several hundred had died within the previous four years. As a result, some traditional practices, beliefs, and languages have been lost or have struggled to survive. The languages of the Austral area still lack official recognition, as of 2015.

== Genetic classification ==
Austral is an Austronesian language, as are most other languages of the Pacific. Within this family, Austral is classified as part of the Tahitic branch of the Polynesian languages, making it closely related to Tahitian and Māori.

== Status ==
The Austral language is classified as "threatened" in the Catalogue of Endangered Languages. With less than 6% of the French Polynesian population speaking Austral, its Ethnologue status is also deemed to be "shifting". This means that the language is staying only within one generation and not being taught to their descendants. Another cause of Austral's dwindling number of speakers has been the community's gradual language shift to the more widely spoken (and closely related) Tahitian.

== Dialects ==
Austral has four defined dialect groups: Ra'ivavae, Rimatara, Rurutu, and extinct Tubuai (also known as Tupuai). Each of these is named for and spoken on its corresponding island: Raivavae, Rimatara, Rurutu and Tubuai.

== Phonology ==
The phonology of the different Austral dialects varies significantly. The Rurutu and Ra'ivavae dialects, for example, have only eight consonant phonemes, making it relatively difficult to understand even for speakers of Tahitian, another Polynesian language. The Ra'ivavae dialect is also unusual in that its rhotic consonant has evolved into a voiced velar stop consonant, similar to the hard "g" sound in English.

Consonants in Rurutu
	Labial	Alveolar	Glottal
Nasal	m	n	
Plosive	p	t	ʔ
Fricative	f v		
Rhotic		r	

Consonants in Ra'ivavae
	Labial	Alveolar	Velar	Glottal
Nasal	m	n		
Plosive	p	t	ɡ	ʔ
Fricative	v			h

Vowels
	Short		Long	
	Front	Back	Front	Back
Close	i	u	iː	uː
Mid	e	o	eː	oː
Open	a		aː	

All dialects have the same five vowels /a, e, i, o, u/, with long variants similar to practically all Polynesian languages.

== Sample verbs ==
Austral verbs
English	Austral
To say	parau
To know	ʔite
To choose	maʔiti
To see	naanaa
To think	manaʔo
To work	ʔatapu
