= Rapa Iti =

Commune in French Polynesia, France

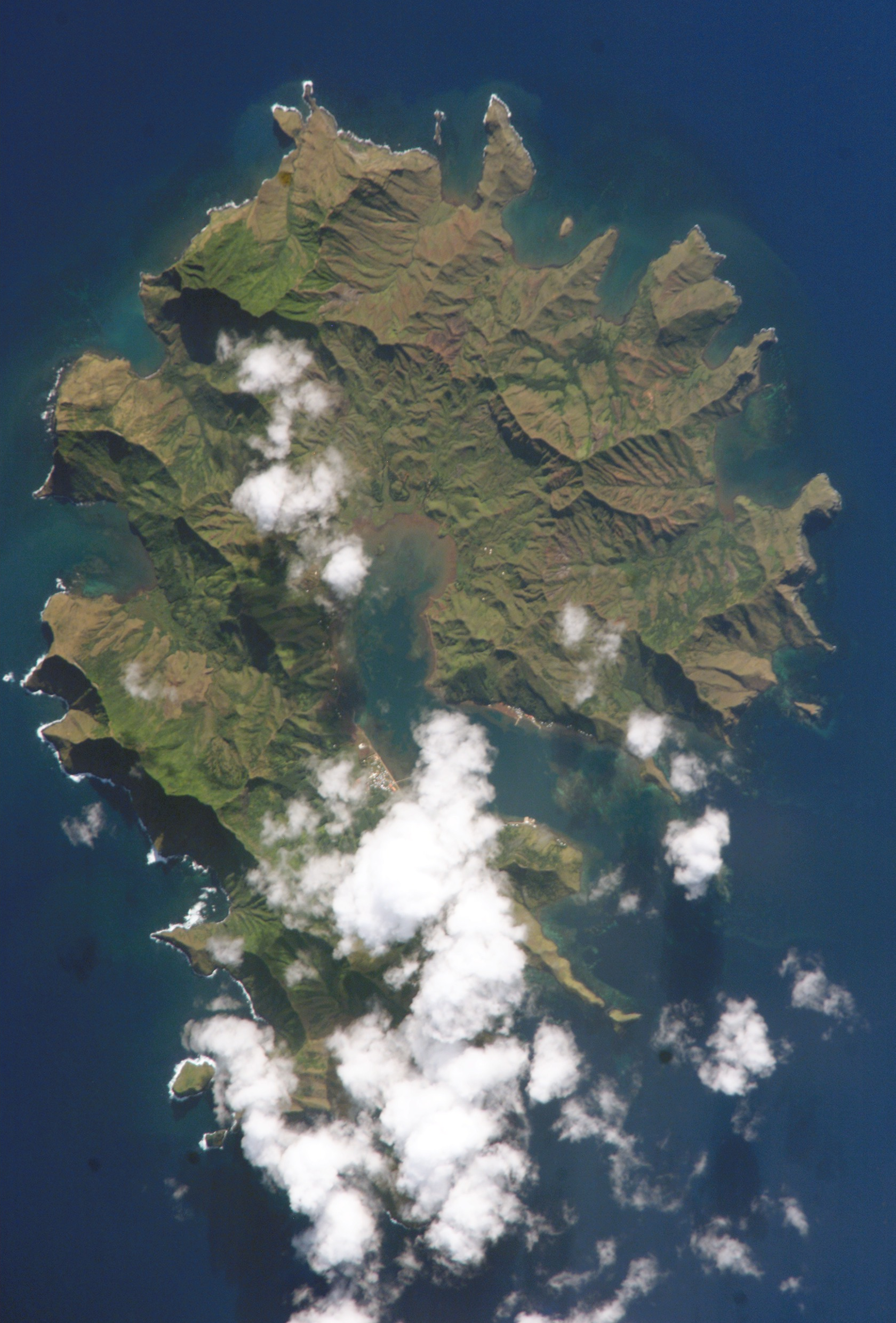
- NASA picture of Rapa

- Location within French Polynesia

Geography
- Location: Pacific Ocean
- Coordinates: 27°36′S 144°20′W
- Archipelago: Australes
- Area: 40.5 km^{2} (15.6 sq mi)
- Highest elevation: 650 m (2130 ft)
- Highest point: Mount Perahu

Administration
- France
- Overseas collectivity: French Polynesia
- Commune: Rapa Iti

Demographics
- Population: 451 (2022)

Rapa
- Commune
- Flag

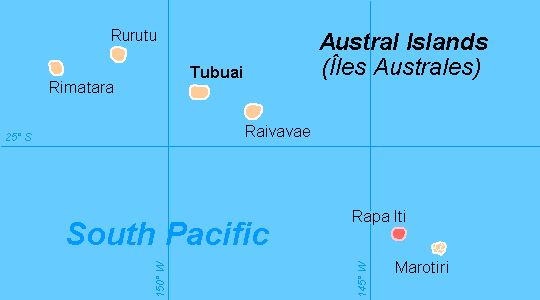
- Location of Rapa
- Coordinates: 27°36′S 144°20′W
- Country: France
- Overseas collectivity: French Polynesia
- Subdivision: Austral Islands

Government
  - Mayor (2020–2026): Tuanainai Narii
- Area^{1}: 40.54 km^{2} (15.65 sq mi)
- Highest elevation: 650 m (2,130 ft)
- Lowest elevation: 0 m (0 ft)
- Population (2022): 451
  - Density: 11.1/km^{2} (28.8/sq mi)
- Time zone: UTC−10:00
- INSEE/Postal code: 98741 /98751
- ^{1} French Land Register data, which excludes lakes, ponds, glaciers > 1 km^{2} (0.386 sq mi or 247 acres) and river estuaries.

Rapa, also called Rapa Iti ("Little Rapa"), is the largest and only inhabited island of the Bass Islands in French Polynesia. An older name for the island is Oparo. The total land area including offshore islets is 40.5 km^{2} (15.6 sq mi). As of the 2022 census, Rapa had a population of 451. The island's highest point is at 650 metres (2,130 ft) elevation at Mont Perahu. Its main town is Ahuréi. The inhabitants of Rapa Iti speak their own Polynesian language called the Rapa language.

== Geography ==
Rapa Iti is located at 27°35′00″S 144°20′00″W. It is shaped roughly like a Greek final sigma (ς), with a well-protected central bay, surrounded by a ring of relatively high mountains. The whole island appears to be the peak of a sinking volcano, with the bay as well as the caldera. The area of the main island is 38.5 km^{2}. Little Rapa Tauturau is an offshore island.

Its main town, Ahuréi (or Ha'uréi), lies on the southern shore of that bay, which is called the Baie d'Ahuréi. A smaller village, Area, is located on the northern shore of the bay. The people are Polynesian. Former times' warfare is indicated by a series of extant ridgetop forts. Today Rapa is home to the Tahitian Choir, in which a third of the island's population sing traditional songs.

Although sometimes considered part of the Austral Islands, Rapa Iti and the Bass Islands have a different geological, linguistic and cultural history.

== History ==
Rapa Iti was first settled by Polynesians, most likely in the 12th century. Their Polynesian dialect developed into what is today the Rapa language over the centuries. It is believed that the depletion of natural resources on the island resulted in warfare, and the inhabitants lived in up to 14 fortified settlements (pa or pare, a type of fort; compare the Māori pā) on peaks and clifftops. It is considered that the oldest of these is Morongo Uta, which was developed c. 1450–1550 AD.

The first European to visit Rapa Iti was George Vancouver on 22 December 1791; he named the island Oparo. Contact with Europeans brought liquor and disease, and between 1824 and 1830 over three quarters of the natives died. Peruvian slavers raided the island as well. When a handful of their victims were returned to the island, they brought with them smallpox, which caused an epidemic. In 1826, there were almost 2000 inhabitants; forty years later, there were fewer than 120.

The independent island kingdom was declared a French protectorate in 1867. The British established a coaling station on the island, which prompted France to formally annex it on 6 March 1881. Subsequently, the native monarchy was abolished and the last queen, the Daughter of Parima, was deposed on 18 June 1887.

Thor Heyerdahl, notably, made excavations in Morongo Uta, seeking links between Rapa Iti and Rapa Nui (Easter Island).

== Climate ==
Rapa Iti has tropical rainforest climate (Af in the Köppen climate classification, Arab in the Trewartha climate classification), bordering on a very-mild winter humid subtropical climate (Cfa in the Köppen climate classification, Cfal in the Trewartha climate classification). Despite being situated south of the Tropic of Capricorn, the remote location in the middle of a tropical ocean enables the climate to be moderated in all seasons. Summers are hot and muggy, and cyclones are rarer, as the islands are located near the Horse Latitudes at thirty degrees south, despite the exposed location makes the island very windy, tempering the summer weather. Very hot weather is very rare, with the highest temperature recorded was 31.6 °C (88.9 °F) in March. Winters are mild and very stormy, due to the isolated and exposed location of Rapa Iti. Precipitation is abundant in all seasons, and sunshine is uncommon every month of the year. The cool winters and strong winds prohibit ultra tropical fruits such as coconuts to thrive, as it has dropped to 8.5 °C (47.3 °F) in September. In addition, the lack of continental influence promotes the vast seasonal lag, as March is the second-warmest month of the year, while September is the second-coldest.

Climate data for Rapa, French Polynesia (1991-2020 normals, extremes 1951-present)
| Month | Jan | Feb | Mar | Apr | May | Jun | Jul | Aug | Sep | Oct | Nov | Dec | Year |
|---|---|---|---|---|---|---|---|---|---|---|---|---|---|
| Record high °C (°F) | 31.0 (87.8) | 30.9 (87.6) | 31.6 (88.9) | 30.3 (86.5) | 28.1 (82.6) | 26.3 (79.3) | 25.5 (77.9) | 25.0 (77.0) | 26.4 (79.5) | 26.4 (79.5) | 28.9 (84.0) | 30.1 (86.2) | 31.6 (88.9) |
| Mean daily maximum °C (°F) | 25.7 (78.3) | 26.5 (79.7) | 26.2 (79.2) | 24.5 (76.1) | 23.0 (73.4) | 21.6 (70.9) | 20.8 (69.4) | 20.5 (68.9) | 20.7 (69.3) | 21.5 (70.7) | 23.0 (73.4) | 24.2 (75.6) | 23.2 (73.8) |
| Daily mean °C (°F) | 23.7 (74.7) | 24.5 (76.1) | 24.0 (75.2) | 22.4 (72.3) | 20.8 (69.4) | 19.3 (66.7) | 18.5 (65.3) | 18.2 (64.8) | 18.4 (65.1) | 19.3 (66.7) | 20.8 (69.4) | 22.2 (72.0) | 21.0 (69.8) |
| Mean daily minimum °C (°F) | 21.7 (71.1) | 22.4 (72.3) | 21.8 (71.2) | 20.2 (68.4) | 18.6 (65.5) | 17.1 (62.8) | 16.3 (61.3) | 15.9 (60.6) | 16.1 (61.0) | 17.0 (62.6) | 18.6 (65.5) | 20.1 (68.2) | 18.8 (65.8) |
| Record low °C (°F) | 12.2 (54.0) | 15.6 (60.1) | 15.2 (59.4) | 13.5 (56.3) | 10.1 (50.2) | 10.2 (50.4) | 9.8 (49.6) | 8.9 (48.0) | 8.5 (47.3) | 10.5 (50.9) | 12.0 (53.6) | 13.2 (55.8) | 8.5 (47.3) |
| Average precipitation mm (inches) | 227.2 (8.94) | 204.9 (8.07) | 256.3 (10.09) | 234.8 (9.24) | 172.2 (6.78) | 215.4 (8.48) | 237.5 (9.35) | 209.0 (8.23) | 148.1 (5.83) | 177.8 (7.00) | 143.1 (5.63) | 209.6 (8.25) | 2,435.9 (95.90) |
| Average precipitation days (≥ 1 mm) | 13.4 | 12.9 | 15.6 | 14.8 | 14.2 | 15.7 | 15.3 | 15.0 | 12.7 | 12.0 | 10.5 | 13.2 | 165.3 |
| Mean monthly sunshine hours | 131.0 | 133.8 | 130.9 | 115.0 | 102.8 | 93.4 | 101.1 | 120.6 | 123.4 | 133.7 | 134.3 | 125.0 | 1,444.9 |
Source: Meteo France

== Environment ==
The Manatau French Polynesian Reserve is a special French Polynesian Reserve to protect the animals and ridgetop forts of an area of southern Rapa. It is located near South Ahuréi.

The island is home to the endemic and critically endangered Rapa fruit dove which is threatened by habitat loss, predation by feral cats and hunting. Its population was estimated in 2017 at 160 individual birds. The critically endangered Rapa shearwater is endemic to surrounding islets. Other birds include the least concern Murphy's petrel, which nest there in small numbers, and the near threatened bristle-thighed curlew which is a non-breeding visitor while migrating. Because of its significance for these species the island has been identified as an Important Bird Area by BirdLife International.

== Administration ==
The commune of Rapa consists of the island of Rapa Iti and the four uninhabited Marotiri rocks.
