= Rapa language =

Language of French Polynesia

Rapa
- Mangaia
- Native to: French Polynesia, Cook Islands
- Native speakers: 300 on Rapa (2007 census); 573 on Mangaia (2011 census); additional speakers in diaspora
- Language family: Austronesian: Malayo-Polynesian; Oceanic; Polynesian; Eastern Polynesian; Central Eastern Polynesian; Tahitic; Rapa
- Dialects: Old Rapa; Reo Rapa; Mangaia

Language codes
- ISO 639-3: ray
- Glottolog: rapa1245
- ELP: Rapa
- Rapa is classified as Severely Endangered by the UNESCO Atlas of the World's Languages in Danger

Rapa, also known as Mangaia, is an Eastern Polynesian language spoken on Rapa Iti in French Polynesia, and on Mangaia in the Cook Islands. There are three varieties of Rapa currently being spoken in French Polynesia: Old Rapa, Reo Rapa and New Rapa. Old Rapa has been mostly replaced by Reo Rapa, a mix of the more commonly spoken Tahitian and Old Rapa. New Rapa – revitalized Old Rapa – is commonly spoken by middle-aged and younger speakers. Rapa is a critically endangered language, and there are only around 300 speakers of Reo Rapa, with only 15% of them able to speak Old Rapa. It may be more vibrant on Mangaia, but there the population has been declining for half a century due to emigration.

== Varieties ==
There are three varieties of the Rapa language currently being spoken: Old Rapa, Reo Rapa and New Rapa. Old Rapa is the indigenous form of Rapa. Reo Rapa as a language was created, not simply by incorporating lexical terms from Tahitian to Old Rapa, but from bilingualism and language shift due to the dominance of Tahitian. While Reo Rapa is a mix of Tahitian and Old Rapa, speakers can generally tell if the words they are speaking are sourced from Tahitian or Old Rapa due to phonemes absent in one language and present in the other. Based on the phonological form, speakers of Reo Rapa are aware that certain words they speak belong to Old Rapa or Tahitian. For instance, velar nasal sounds such as /ŋ/ and velar stop sounds like /k/ are not present in Tahitian but are in Old Rapa.

The most common variety on the island of Rapa Iti is Reo Rapa. It was formed from Tahitian and Old Rapa and developed due to language shift. However, this shift halted at some point in the language's development. Walworth defines this as a shift-break language. Reo Rapa is not a koine language, where a language is created due to interaction between two groups speaking mutually intelligible languages. Contact between Old Rapa and Tahitian speakers was indirect and never prolonged, violating a requirement to be called a koiné language. Reo Rapa was the result of a monolingual community that began to shift to the more dominant Tahitian Language, thus creating a bilingual community, which eventually led to Reo Rapa.

Although they are sister languages, neither Reo Rapa nor Old Rapa should be confused with the Rapa Nui language. Additionally, the language is sufficiently different from the rest of the Austral Islands languages to be considered a separate language.

New Rapa is a form or variety of Reo Rapa starting to be used by people under 50 as an attempt by the younger generation to reverse the language shift to the Tahitian Language. In New Rapa, the Tahitian elements are phonologically modified as an attempt to create words that sound more similar to Old Rapa instead of Tahitian. As a means of being identified as a "true local" Rapa speaker, the newer generation is modifying the Reo Rapa language so that it sounds less like Tahitian and more like Old Rapa.

== History ==
The loss of the indigenous Old Rapa began with an enormous population decrease due to disease brought by foreigners (mainly Europeans). Within the span of five years the population decreased by 75%. By 1867 the population was down to 120 residents from its estimated original of two thousand. Of the islands of French Polynesia, Tahiti had become a large influence and had become a filter for Western influence, so before anything entered the islands it would have to pass through Tahiti. Being the powerful influence it was, its ways of religion, education, and government were easily adopted by the people of Rapa Iti, and the language of Tahiti followed. The language known as Reo Rapa was not created by the combination of two languages but through the introduction of Tahitian to the Rapa monolingual community. Reo Rapa is not a completely different language from Old Rapa or Tahitian but a mixed language.

Old Rapa is considered to be endangered. It has few speakers and the only people who spoke Old Rapa proficiently, as of 2015, were in their 60s. The oldest published documentation of Old Rapa dates back to 1864, a short word list compiled by James L. Green under the London Missionary Society. The most comprehensive study of the language is Walworth's 2015 description of the language, following only the 1930 five-volume unpublished manuscript by John F.G. Stokes. Additionally, a book of legends was published in 2008 that was the product of the work of French ethnologist Christian Ghasarian and a Rapa elder, Alfred Make.

== Phonology of Old Rapa ==
Consonant phonemes of Old Rapa
	Labial	Dental	Alveolar	Velar	Glottal
Plosive	p	t		k	ʔ
Nasal	m		n	ŋ	
Fricative	v				
Tap/Flap			ɾ		

Vowels are noted as /i, e, ɑ, o, u/.

Similar to other languages that fall within the Eastern Polynesian language family, the consonant phoneme inventory of Old Rapa is relatively small. Consisting of only nine distinct consonants, Old Rapa is constructed of eight voiceless phonemes and one voiced phoneme.

Of the nine phonemes, four are a result of a stop – /p/, /t/, /k/, and /ʔ/. While /p/ is constantly bilabial and /t/ is dento-alveolar, the place where /k/ is articulated can range anywhere from pre-velar to uvular. When spoken, the place of articulation of /k/ depends on the succeeding vowel segment. Walworth uses the following examples to demonstrate these differing occurrences:

- Before a high-fronted [i]: in the word kite 'know', /k/ is pre-velar
- Before a mid-fronted [e]: in the word kete 'basket', /k/ is velar
- Before a low-back [ɑ]: in the word karakua 'parent', /k/ is distinguishably more backed
- Before a mid-back [o]: in the word komo 'sleep', /k/ is uvular

The alveolar and post-alveolar stops, while distinguishable in the linguistic study of Old Rapa, are often misinterpreted as the phoneme /k/ to native speakers. This observation was noted multiple times in Walworth's conversations with native speakers; for example, the difference between Tākate and Kākake was not perceived by the native speaker.

In the study of velar stops, there are instances in which lenition, the weakened articulation of a consonant, occurs. In the first case, the velar stop /k/ transitions more into a velar fricative when placed in the unstressed syllables. In Walworth's example in the word kōta'e 'water', the /k/ phoneme is pronounced as [k]; however, in the word eipoko 'head', the /k/ is pronounced as [x]. The second case is very similar to the first, but on a phrase level. In this sense, when placed in a word that is not stressed, lenition occurs.

When referring to the Rapa usage of the phoneme /ɾ/, there is a distinct difference between the alveolar tap and a trill. When pronounced in words where it is located at the beginning of the stressed syllable, the alveolar tap becomes better defined as a trill. The usage of this phoneme and its variants is evident in Walworth's examples:

Examples where a trill is perceived:

- /rapa/ 'name of island' > [ˈra.pa]
- /roki/ 'taro-bed' > [ˈro.xi]
- /raːkau/ 'plant-life' > [ˈraː.xao]

Examples where a tap is retained:

- /karakua/ 'parent' > [ka.ɾa.ˈku.a]
- /ʔare/ 'house' > [ˈʔa.ɾe]
- /taratika/ 'ridge' > [ta.ɾa.ˈti.xa]

While currently indeterminable, it is plausible that in Old Rapa the /ɾ/ phoneme existed closer resembling the lateral approximate /l/. In an article published by John Stokes in 1955, what is now taken to be the /ɾ/ phoneme was approximated to be a mix between "a clear l as in English and soft r." However, Walworth states that even in the oldest of her consultants, there was no recollection of the /l/ phoneme.

When observing the usage of the labiodental fricative /v/, the shift period away from Old Rapa becomes more evident. In the older generations of native speakers, this phoneme is articulated more like that of the labiodental approximant [ʋ]. The usage of the labiodental fricative is almost always used by the newer generations of native speakers, whereas the approximant is almost never used. This change is directly attributed to the Tahitian influence of the labiodental fricative.

== Grammar ==
Some examples of Reo Rapa grammar are shown below.

- Perfective TAM (Tense – Aspect – Mood) /ka/

ka rāhi para te taofe
PFV much ripe INDEF coffee
'The coffee was really ripe.'

- Definite word /tō/

e hina’aro na vau tō mei’a ra
IPFV like DEI SG DEF banana DEIXIS
'I would like those bananas (you mentioned).'

- Question words
  - /vai/ (Who)
  - /a’a/ (What)
  - /’ea/ (Where)
  - /a’ea/ (When)
  - /nā ’ea/ (How)
  - /’ia/ (How many)

e a’a tō-koe huru
IPFV what ART.POSS-PL state
'How are you' (lit. 'What is your state?')

- Past negative /ki’ere/

ki’ere vau i haere i te fare
NEG SG PFV go PREP ART house
'I did not go to a house'

- Non-past negative (Regular negative) /kāre/

kāre tā-koe puta
NEG ART.POSS-PL book
'You don't have your book.' (Literal translation – 'your book doesn't exist')

- Adverbial /ake/

me rahi ake teie eika i
thing big ADV DEM fish PREP
'This fish is bigger than my fish the other day'

While Old Rapa contributes a majority of Reo Rapa grammar words, some are taken from the Tahitian language as well such as the negative words, ’aita and ’eiaha. While ’aita is used as a simple "no" in Reo Rapa, ’eiaha is used to add a negative to a sentence to change a positive "yes" sentence to a negative "no" sentence.

- Negative particle /’eiaha/

’eiaha ’a haere mai i tō-ku fare
NEG IPFV go EV PREP ART-POSS-PAT-SG house

== Additional sources ==
- Charpentier, Jean-Michel; François, Alexandre (2015). Atlas Linguistique de Polynésie Française — Linguistic Atlas of French Polynesia (in French and English). Mouton de Gruyter & Université de la Polynésie Française. ISBN 978-3-11-026035-9.
- Richards, Rhys. "The Earliest Foreign Visitors and Their Massive Depopulation of Rapa-iti from 1824 to 1830." Jso.revues.org. N.p., n.d. Web. .
- Walworth, Mary (2015). The Language of Rapa Iti: Description of a Language in Change (Ph.D. thesis). University of Hawaii at Manoa. hdl:10125/51029.
- Walworth, Mary (2017). "Classifying Old Rapa: Linguistic evidence for contact networks in Southeast Polynesia". Issues in Austronesian Historical Linguistics Special Publication 1: 102–122. hdl:10524/52405.
- Walworth, Mary E. (2017a). "Reo Rapa: A Polynesian Contact Language". Journal of Language Contact. 10 (1): 98–141. doi:10.1163/19552629-01001006.
