= List of cities in French Polynesia =

The following is a list of cities in French Polynesia:

== List ==
=== Largest cities ===
	Name	Population (2002)	Area (km^{2})	Density (people/km^{2})
1	Faʻaʻā	28 339	34.2	831
2	Papeete	25 521	19	1 343
3	Punaauia	23 762	76	313
4	Pirae	14 850	35	424
5	Moorea-Maiao	14 693	134	110
6	Mahina	13 609	52	264
7	Paea	12 327	65	190
8	Taiarapu-Est	10 596	216	49
9	Papara	9 659	93	104
10	Arue	9 319	16	582

=== List by division ===
- Marquesas Islands :
  - Fatu Hiva
  - Hiva Oa
  - Nuku Hiva (chef-lieu)
  - Tahuata
  - Ua Huka
  - Ua Pou
- Windward Islands (Society Islands) :
  - Arue
  - Faʻaʻā
  - Hitia’a O Te Ra
  - Mahina
  - Moorea-Maiao
  - Paea
  - Papara
  - Papeete (chef-lieu)
  - Pirae
  - Punaauia
  - Taiarapu-Est
  - Taiarapu-Ouest
  - Teva I Uta
- Tuamotus-Gambier:
  - Anaa
  - Arutua
  - Fakarava
  - Fangatau
  - Gambier
  - Hao
  - Hikueru
  - Makemo
  - Manihi
  - Napuka
  - Nukutavake
  - Puka Puka
  - Rangiroa
  - Reao
  - Takaroa
  - Tatakoto
  - Tureia
- Austral Islands
  - Raivavae
  - Rapa Iti
  - Rimatara
  - Rurutu
  - Tubuai (chef-lieu)
- Leeward Islands (Society Islands)
  - Bora-Bora
  - Huahine
  - Maupiti
  - Tahaa
  - Taputapuatea
  - Tumaraa
  - Uturoa (chef-lieu)

Sources : INSEE - Code officiel géographique 2005
