= List of twin towns and sister cities in New Zealand =

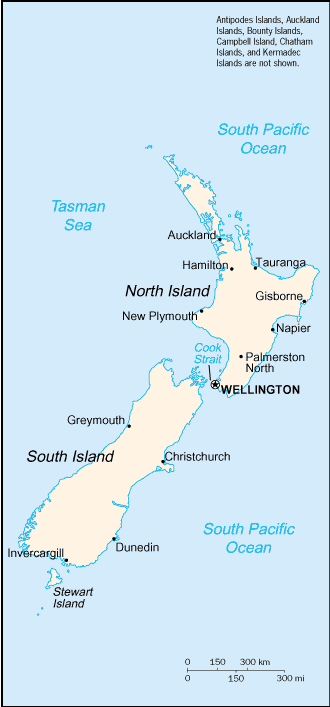
Map of New Zealand

This is a list of territorial authorities in New Zealand which have standing links to local communities in other countries. In most cases, the association, especially when formalised by local government, is known as "town twinning" (usually in Europe) or "sister cities" (usually in the rest of the world).

== A ==
Ashburton

- Ashburton, England, United Kingdom
- Minamiuonuma, Japan
- Pulaski, United States
- Puyang, China

Auckland

- Brisbane, Australia
- Busan, South Korea
- Fukuoka, Japan
- Guangzhou, China
- Kakogawa, Japan
- Los Angeles, United States
- Taichung, Taiwan
- Utsunomiya, Japan

== C ==
Christchurch

- Adelaide, Australia
- Christchurch, England, United Kingdom
- Gansu, China
- Kurashiki, Japan
- Seattle, United States
- Songpa (Seoul), South Korea
- Wuhan, China

== D ==
Dunedin

- Edinburgh, Scotland, United Kingdom
- Otaru, Japan
- Portsmouth, United States
- Shanghai, China

== G ==
Gisborne

- Mahina, French Polynesia
- Nonoichi, Japan
- Palm Desert, United States
- Rizhao, China

Gore

- Tamworth, Australia

== H ==
Hamilton

- Chengdu, China
- Sacramento, United States
- Saitama, Japan
- Wuxi, China

Hastings

- Guilin, China

Hauraki

- Jiading (Shanghai), China

Horowhenua – Foxton

- Narita, Japan

Hurunui

- Changping (Beijing), China
- Honghu, China

Hutt

- Minoh, Japan
- Taizhou, China
- Tempe, United States

== I ==
Invercargill

- Kumagaya, Japan
- Suqian, China

== M ==
Marlborough

- Ningxia, China
- Otari, Japan
- Tendō, Japan

Masterton

- Changchun, China
- Hatsukaichi, Japan

Matamata-Piako

- Ballina, Australia

== N ==
Napier

- Lianyungang, China
- Tomakomai, Japan
- Victoria, Canada

Nelson

- Eureka, United States
- Huangshi, China
- Miyazu, Japan
- Yangjiang, China

New Plymouth

- Kunming, China
- Mishima, Japan

== P ==
Palmerston North

- Guiyang, China
- Missoula, United States

Porirua

- Blacktown, Australia
- Nishio, Japan
- Whitby, England, United Kingdom

== Q ==
Queenstown-Lakes

- Aspen, United States

== R ==
Rotorua Lakes

- Beppu, Japan
- Klamath Falls, United States
- Lake Macquarie, Australia
- Wuzhong (Suzhou), China

== S ==
Selwyn

- Akitakata, Japan
- Coventry, United States
- Shandan, China

South Taranaki

- Harbin, China

== T ==
Taupō

- Hakone, Japan
- Nouméa, New Caledonia
- Suzhou, China

Tauranga

- Hitachi, Japan
- San Bernardino, United States
- Yantai, China

Timaru

- Eniwa, Japan
- Orange, Australia
- Orange, United States
- Weihai, China

== U ==
Upper Hutt

- Mesa, United States

== W ==
Waimakariri

- Enshi, China
- Zonnebeke, Belgium

Waipa – Cambridge

- Bihoro, Japan
- Le Quesnoy, France

Wellington

- Beijing, China
- Canberra, Australia
- Çanakkale, Turkey
- Chania, Greece
- Harrogate, England, United Kingdom
- Sakai, Japan
- Sydney, Australia
- Xiamen, China

Westland

- Huanggang, China

Whakatāne

- Kamagaya, Japan

Whanganui

- Nagaizumi, Japan
- Toowoomba, Australia

Whangarei

- Haikou, China
- Taputapuatea, French Polynesia
- Tumaraa, French Polynesia
- Uturoa, French Polynesia
