= Puohine =

Pūohine
- Associated commune of Taputapuatea
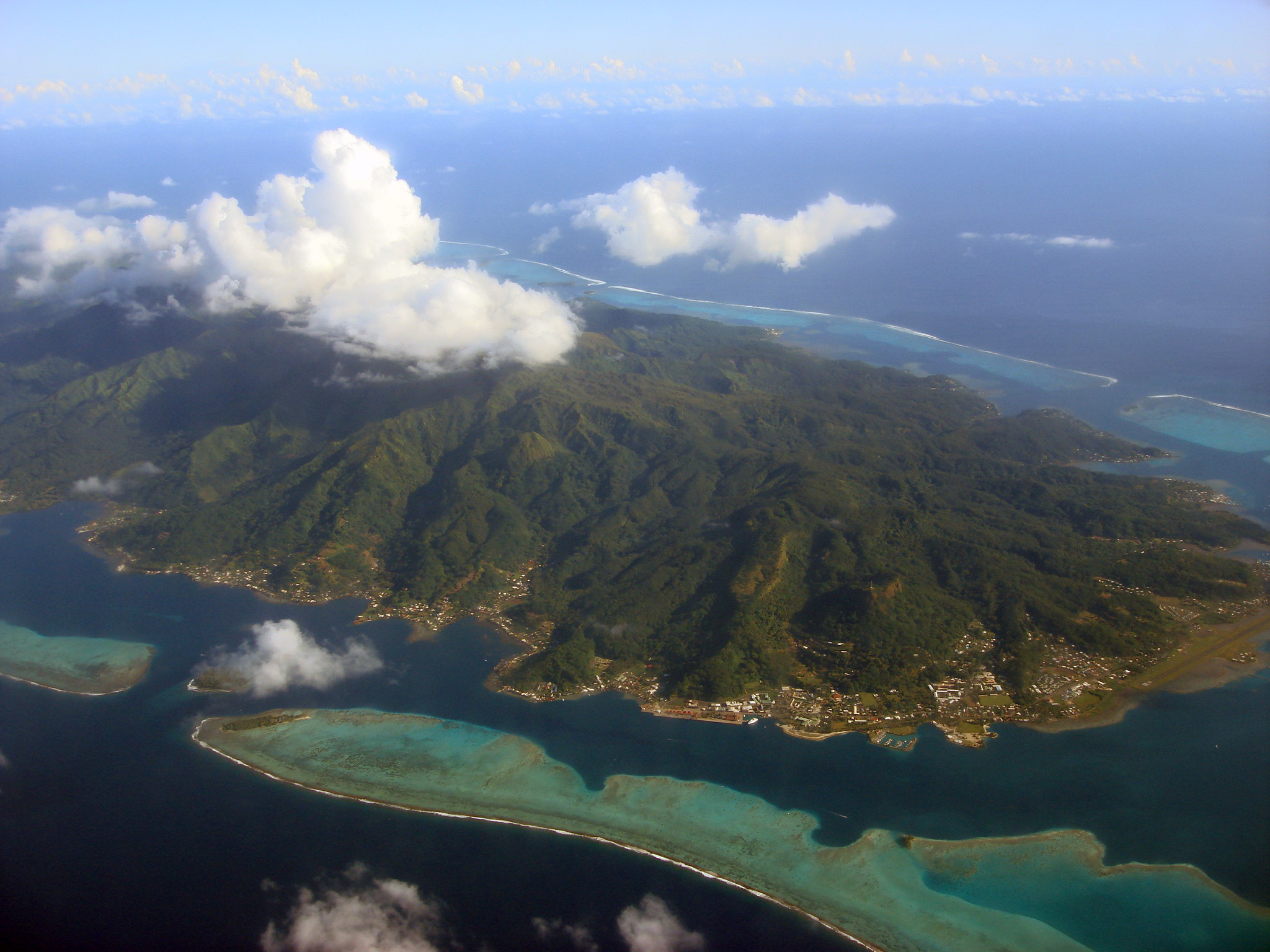
- Raiatea, the island on which Pūohine is located

- Location within French Polynesia
- Location of Pūohine
- Coordinates: 16°53′26″S 151°23′59″W
- Country: France
- Overseas collectivity: French Polynesia
- Subdivision: Leeward Islands
- Commune: Taputapuatea
- Elevation: 8 m (26 ft)
- Population (2022): 362
- Time zone: UTC−10:00

Pūohine is an associated commune on the island of Raiatea, in French Polynesia. It is part of the commune Taputapuatea. According to the 2022 census, the population was 362.
