= Hipu =

- Associated commune of Taha'a
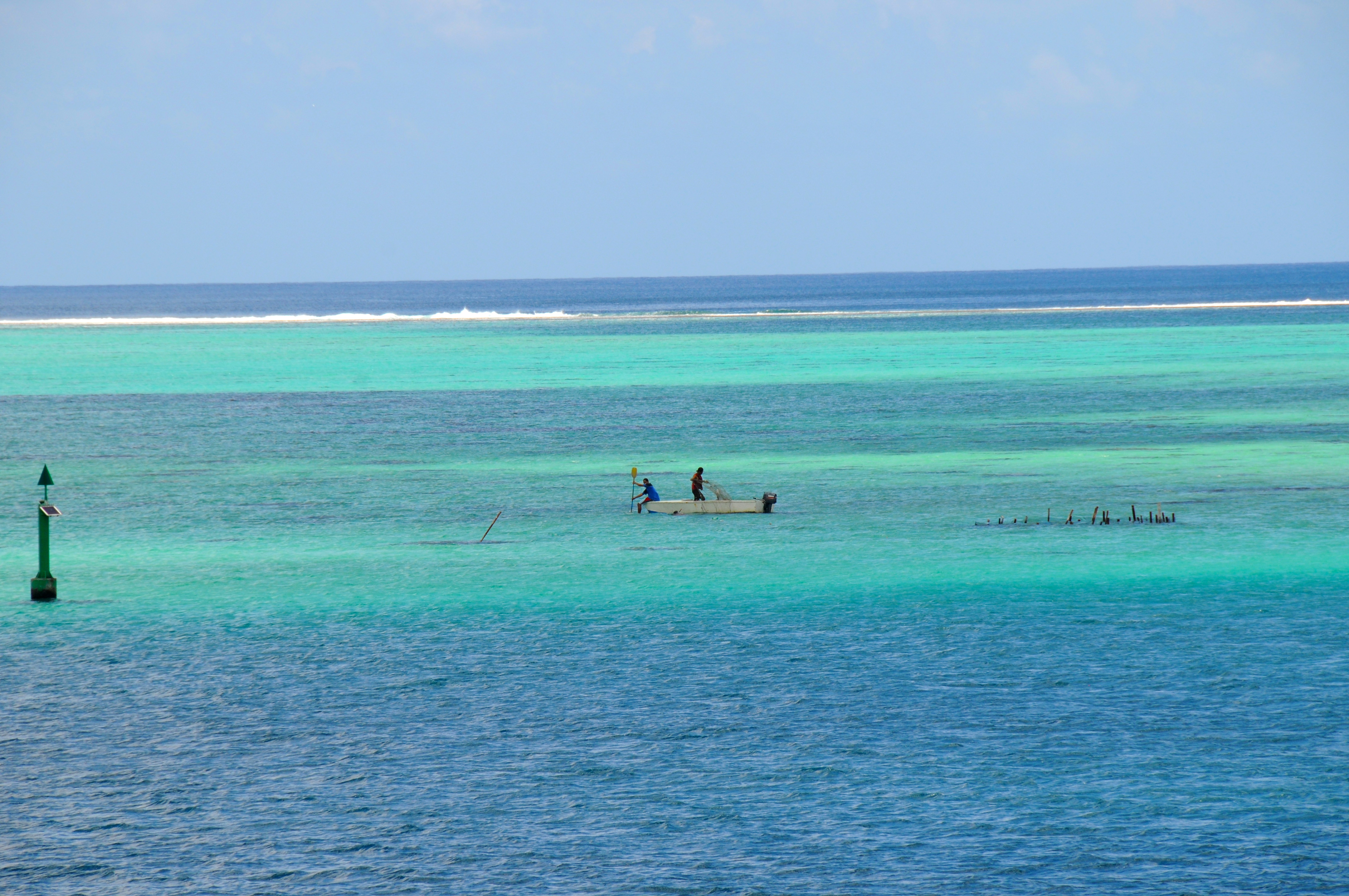

- Location within French Polynesia
- Location of Hipu
- Coordinates: 16°36′26″S 151°29′15″W
- Country: France
- Overseas collectivity: French Polynesia
- Subdivision: Leeward Islands
- Commune: Taha'a
- Population (2022): 451
- Time zone: UTC−10:00

Hipu is an associated commune located in the island commune of Taha'a, in French Polynesia. It is situated in the subdivision of the Leeward Islands, an overseas collectivity of French Polynesia. Its population is 451 (2022).
