= Fetuna =

- Associated commune of Tumaraa
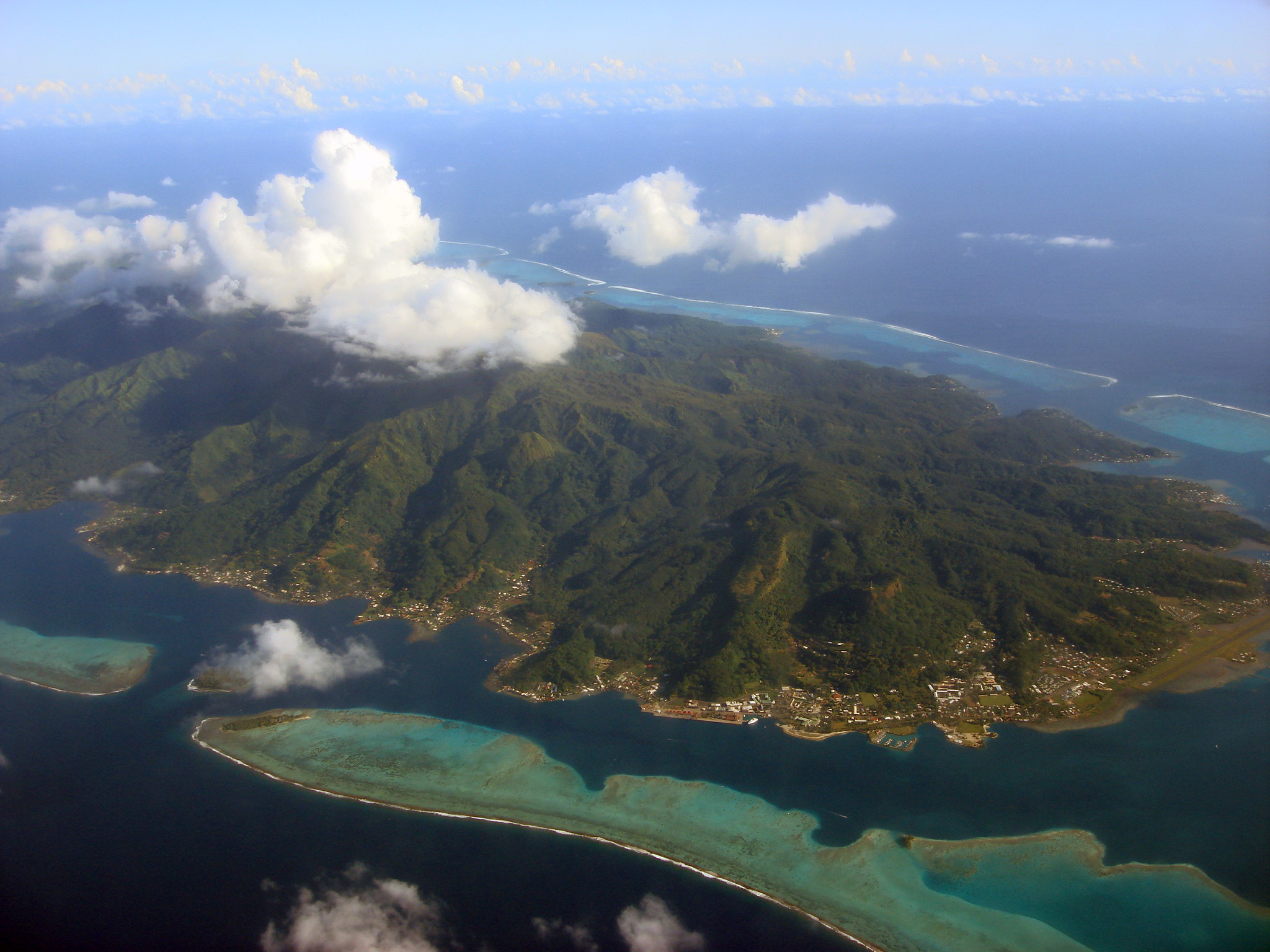
- Raiatea, the island on which Fetuna is located

- Location within French Polynesia
- Location of Fetuna
- Coordinates: 16°54′5″S 151°26′2″W
- Country: France
- Overseas collectivity: French Polynesia
- Subdivision: Leeward Islands
- Commune: Tumaraa
- Elevation: 14 m (46 ft)
- Population (2022): 367
- Time zone: UTC−10:00

Fetuna is an associated commune on the island of Raiatea, in French Polynesia. It is part of the commune Tumaraa. According to the 2022 census, it had a population of 367.
