= Faʻaʻaha =

Faaaha
- Associated commune of Taha'a
- Location within French Polynesia
- Location of Faaaha
- Coordinates: 16°36′S 150°30′W
- Country: France
- Overseas collectivity: French Polynesia
- Subdivision: Leeward Islands
- Commune: Taha'a
- Population (2022): 447
- Time zone: UTC−10:00

Fa'a'aha is an associated commune located in the island commune of Taha'a, in French Polynesia. It is situated in the subdivision of the Leeward Islands, an overseas collectivity of French Polynesia.

== Structure ==
The associated commune of Fa'a'aha is made up of part of the island of Taha'a, and the two motus closest to this region: Mahae'a and Toahotu.

== Demographics ==
Historical population
Year	Pop.	±%
1977	500	—
1983	334	−33.2%
1988	363	+8.7%
1996	384	+5.8%
2002	434	+13.0%
2007	457	+5.3%
2012	476	+4.2%
2017	428	−10.1%
2022	447	+4.4%
Source: Insee
