= Tehurui =

- Associated commune of Tumaraa
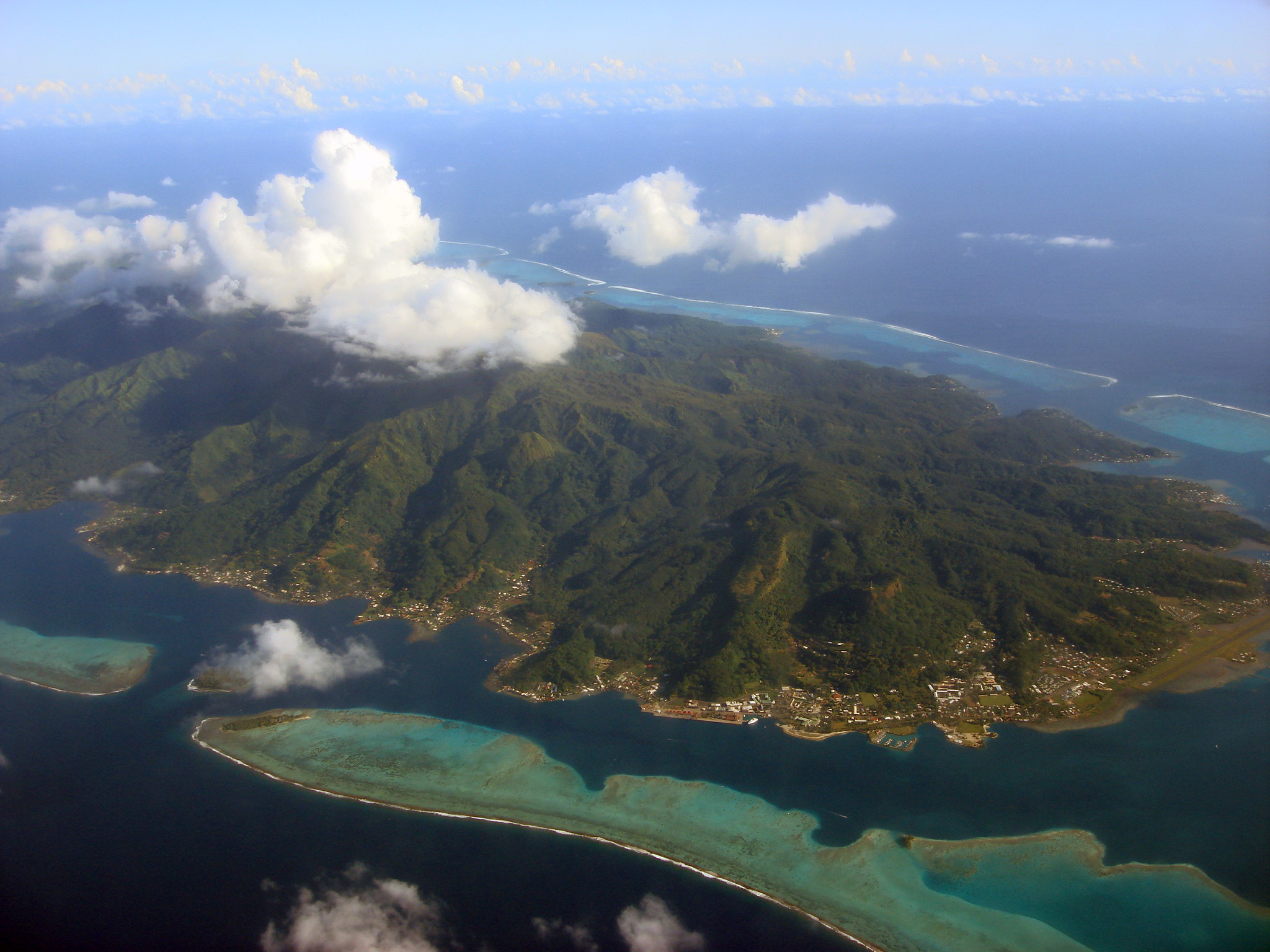
- Raiatea, the island on which Tehurui is located

- Location within French Polynesia
- Location of Tehurui
- Coordinates: 16°50′15″S 151°28′55″W
- Country: France
- Overseas collectivity: French Polynesia
- Subdivision: Leeward Islands
- Commune: Tumaraa
- Elevation: 8 m (26 ft)
- Population (2022): 550
- Time zone: UTC−10:00

Tehurui is an associated commune on the island of Raiatea, in French Polynesia. It is part of the commune Tumaraa. According to the 2022 census, it had a population of 550.
