= Tevaitoa =

- Associated commune of Tumaraa
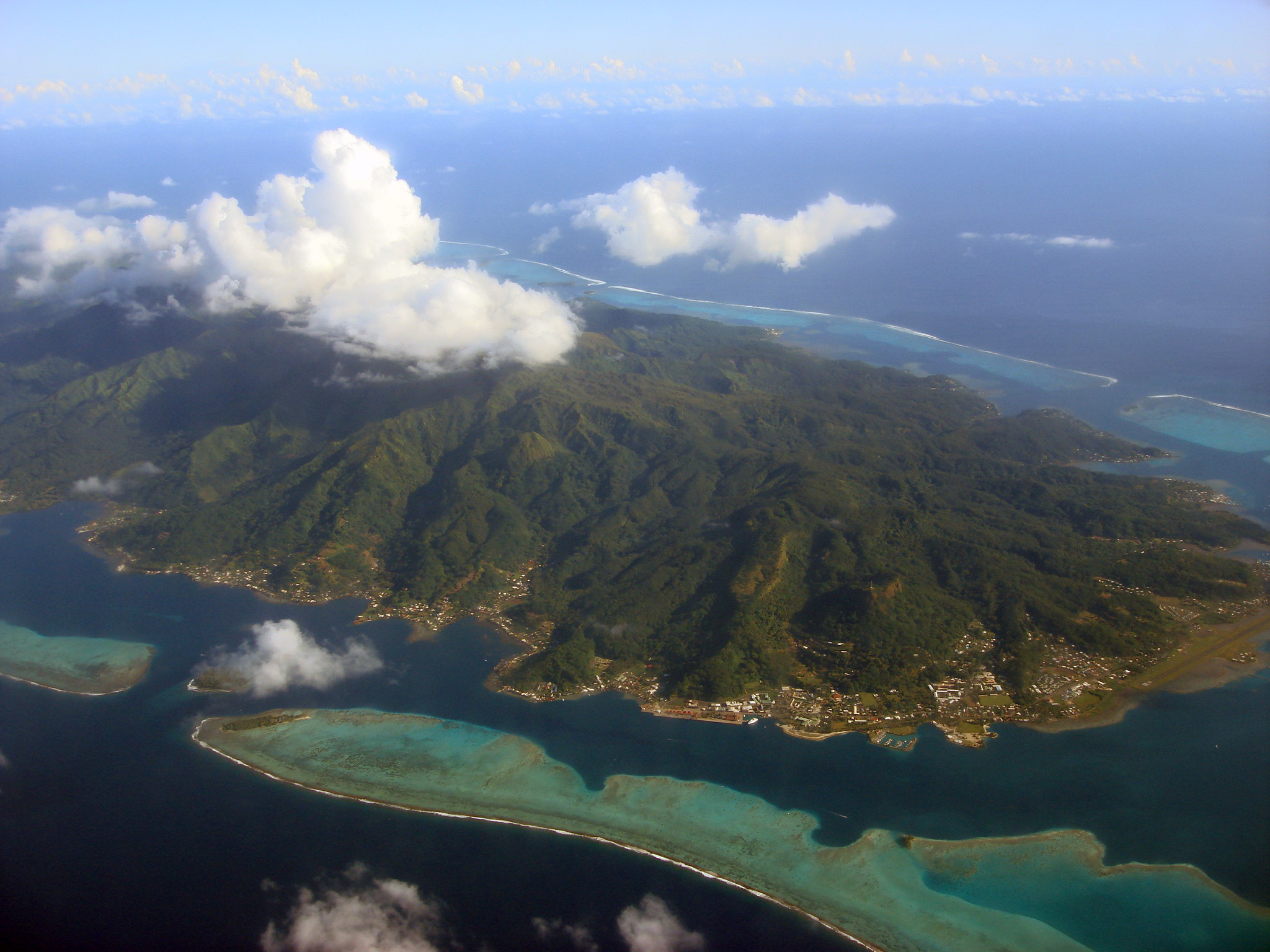
- Raiatea, the island on which Tevaitoa is located

- Location within French Polynesia
- Location of Tevaitoa
- Coordinates: 16°47′25″S 151°29′20″W
- Country: France
- Overseas collectivity: French Polynesia
- Subdivision: Leeward Islands
- Commune: Tumaraa
- Elevation: 7 m (23 ft)
- Population (2022): 2,019
- Time zone: UTC−10:00

Tevaitoa is an associated commune on the island of Raiatea, in French Polynesia. It is part of the commune Tumaraa. According to the 2022 census, it had a population of 2,019.
