= Haʻapū =

Haapu
- Associated commune of Huahine
- Location within French Polynesia
- Location of Haapu
- Coordinates: 16°44′0″S 151°2′0″W
- Country: France
- Overseas collectivity: French Polynesia
- Subdivision: Leeward Islands
- Commune: Huahine
- Population (2022): 680
- Time zone: UTC−10:00

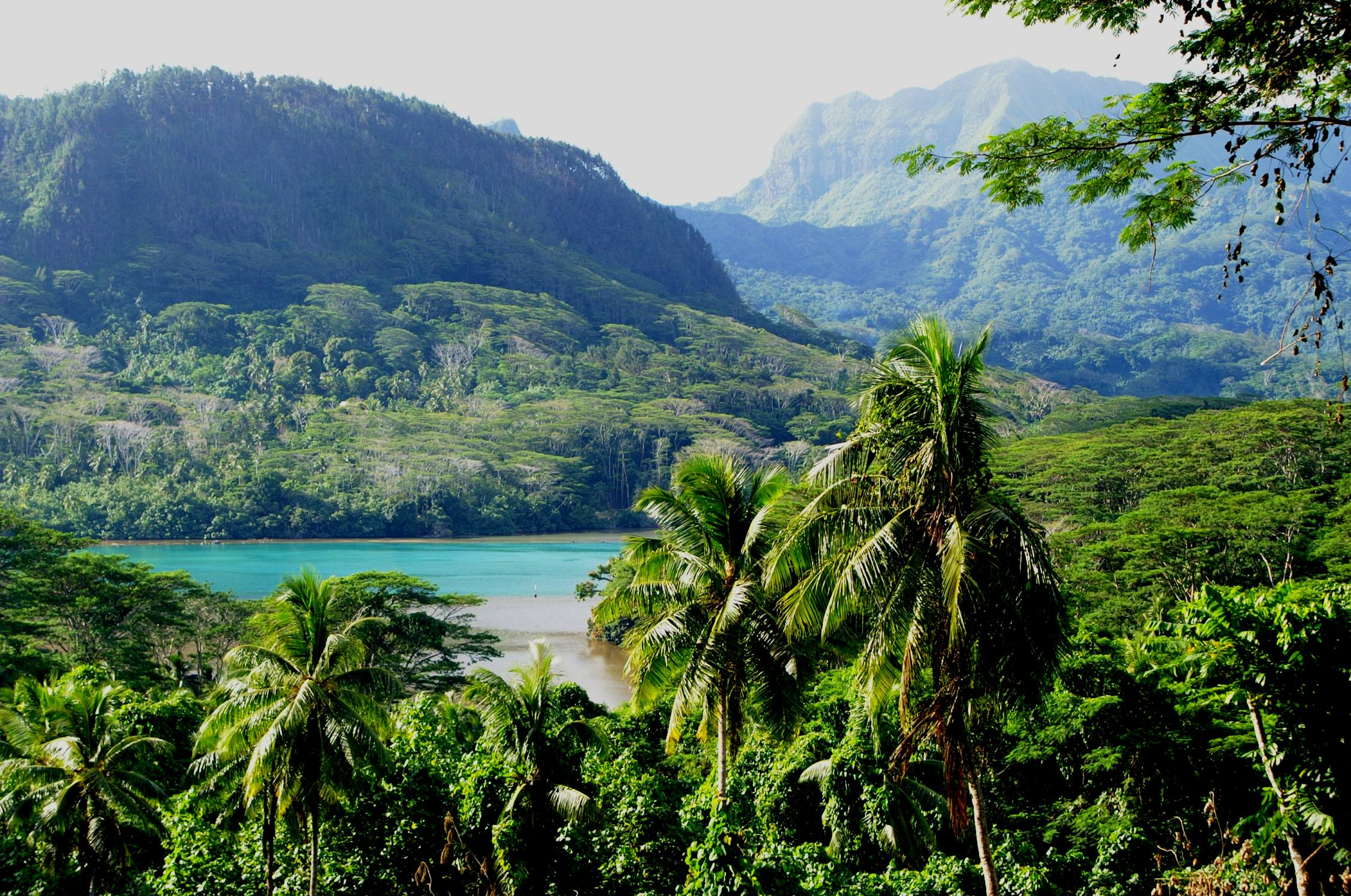
Haapu Bay

Ha'apū is an associated commune located in the commune of Huahine on the island of the same name, in French Polynesia.
