= Vaiaʻau =

Vaiaau
- Associated commune of Tumaraa
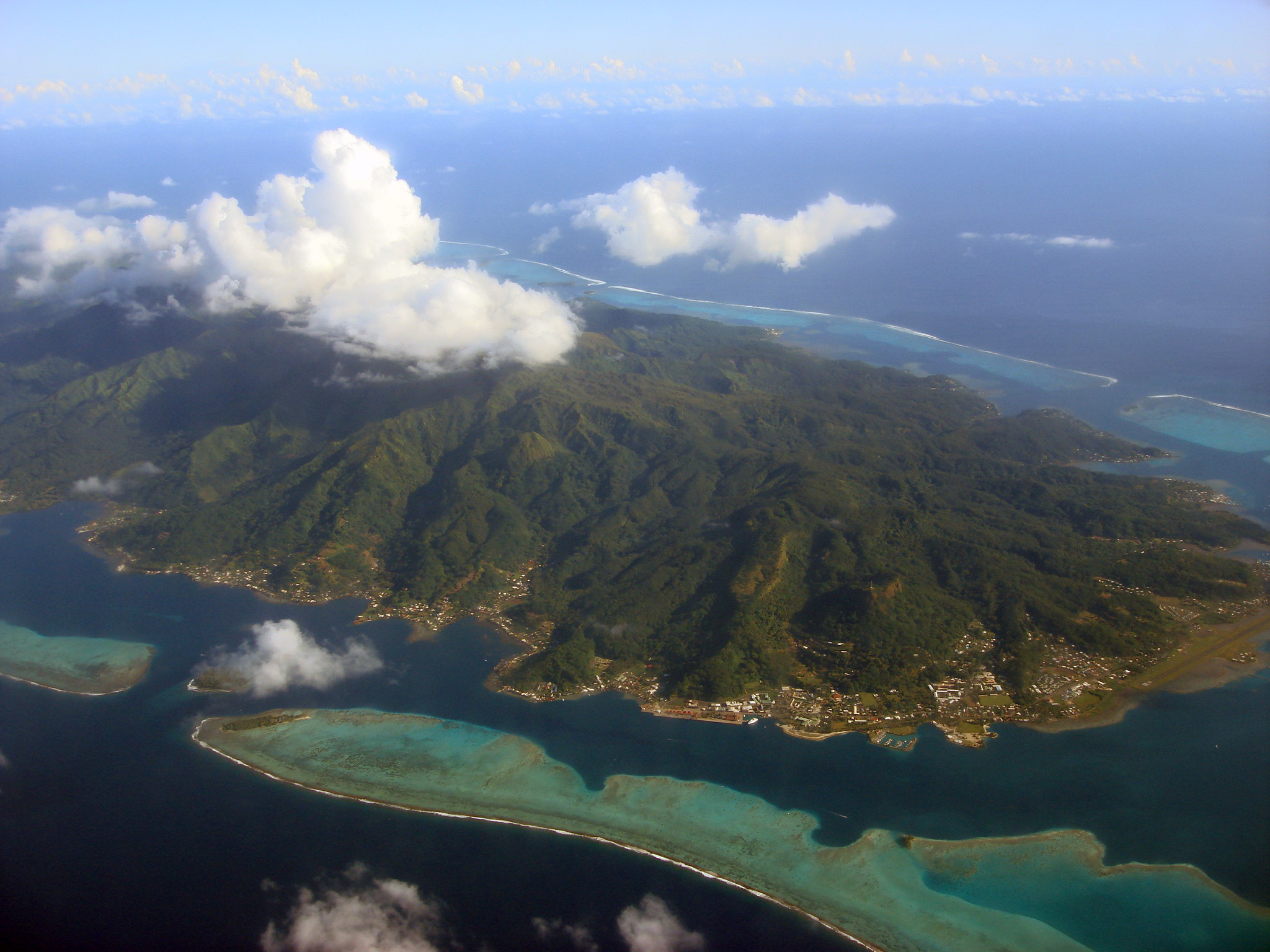
- Raiatea, the island on which Vaiaau is located

- Location within French Polynesia
- Location of Vaiaau
- Coordinates: 16°51′32″S 151°28′49″W
- Country: France
- Overseas collectivity: French Polynesia
- Subdivision: Leeward Islands
- Commune: Tumaraa
- Elevation: 8 m (26 ft)
- Population (2022): 782
- Time zone: UTC−10:00

Vaiaau, also known as Vaia'au, is an associated commune on the island of Raiatea, in French Polynesia. It is part of the commune Tumaraa. According to the 2022 census, it had a population of 782.
