= Uturoa =

Commune in French Polynesia, France

- Commune
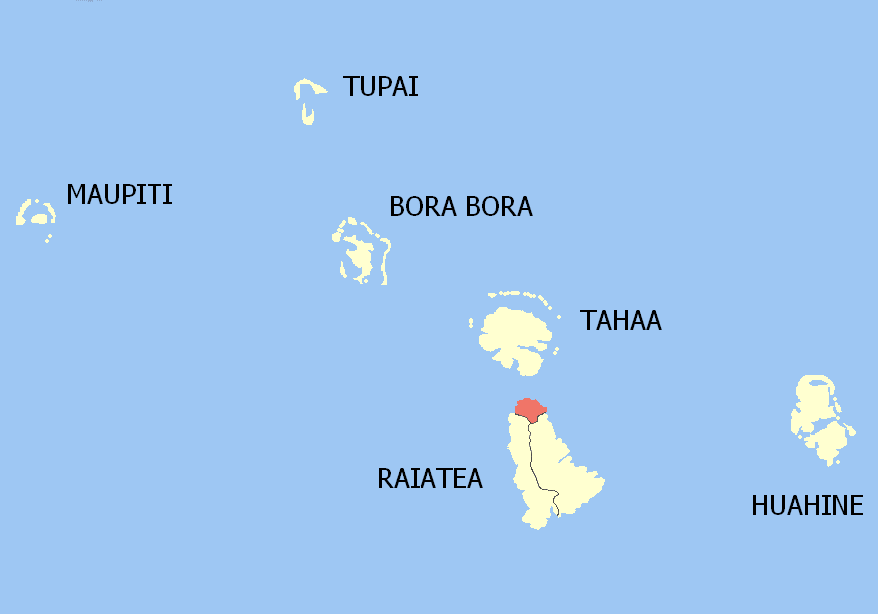
- Location of the commune (in red) within the Leeward Islands
- Location of Uturoa
- Coordinates: 16°43′52″S 151°26′35″W
- Country: France
- Overseas collectivity: French Polynesia
- Subdivision: Leeward Islands

Government
  - Mayor (2020–2026): Matahi Brotherson
- Area^{1}: 15 km^{2} (5.8 sq mi)
- Highest elevation: 479 m (1,572 ft)
- Lowest elevation: 0 m (0 ft)
- Population (2022): 3,663
  - Density: 240/km^{2} (630/sq mi)
- Time zone: UTC−10:00
- INSEE/Postal code: 98758 /98735
- ^{1} French Land Register data, which excludes lakes, ponds, glaciers > 1 km^{2} (0.386 sq mi or 247 acres) and river estuaries.

Uturoa is a commune located in Ra'iātea, the largest island of the Îles Sous le Vent (Leeward Islands) in French Polynesia, in the South Pacific Ocean. It is situated in between the administrative subdivision of Leeward Islands and the main port of the island of Ra'iātea. According to the 2022 census, Uturoa has a population of 3,663. The commune lies approximately 120 miles (193.121 km) northwest of Pape'ete, the capital of French Polynesia.

== History ==
The first settlers of Uturoa were early Polynesians that came from Southeast Asia. They built simple shelters using grass and tree branches. Their diet consisted mostly of fish, wild animals, wild tubers, honey, and wild fruits. The first European to visit Uturoa was the Portuguese navigator Pedro Fernandez de Quirós in 1606. Quirós referred to the island as The Fugitive in his maps.

In the 18th century, the famed British explorer Captain James Cook visited Uturoa during his attempt to map the Pacific Ocean. Later on, Charles Darwin visited Uturoa, while also exploring the Society Islands. The forces of Queen Mamea raided Uturoa in 1896, in retaliation for the French annexation of her kingdom, and killed several traders. Don the Beachcomber also lived in Uturoa for many years before it was raided.

== Government ==
The current mayor of Uturoa is Sylviane Terooatea was re-elected for a second term in 2014 with a mandate until 2020. Preceding the current mayor was Fillippe Brotherson, who served for 39 years.

== Geography ==
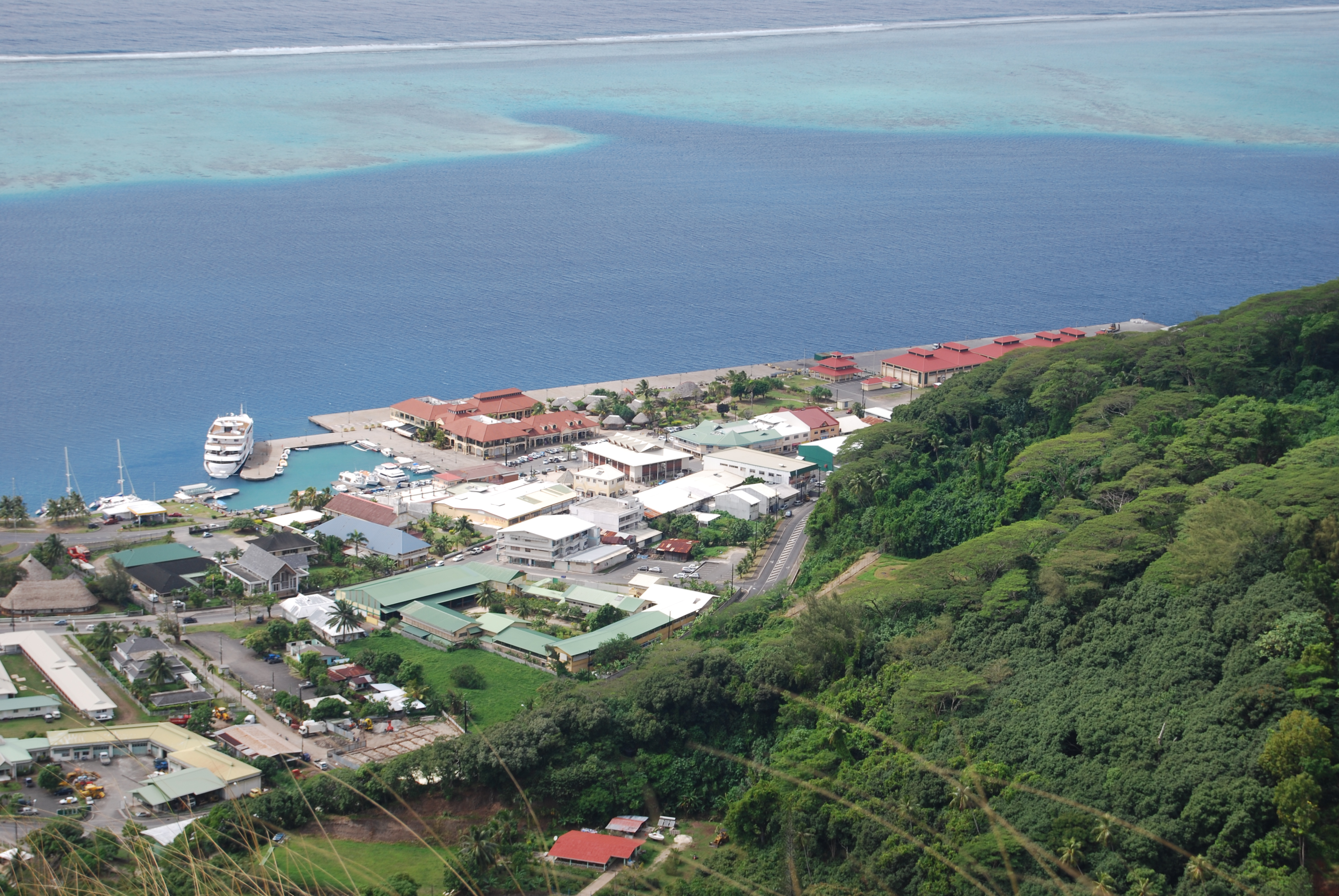
View of Uturoa from near mountains

Uturoa is located approximately 209 miles (336 km) from Teahupo'o, a district in Tahiti, and is located close to a reef break. It is the northernmost point on the island of Ra'iātea and features the views of Bora Bora, Taha'a, and Huahine. The commune is approximately 5 ft (1.5 m) above sea level. The mountains of Uturoa form coastal ranges, as they are not located very far inland. Uturoa is situated between the small pass of Taha'a and the forest-covered mountains of Ra'iātea. Mount Tapioi, 294 meters high, is one of the best vantage points to observe the lagoon and the neighbouring islands. Certain beaches of Uturoa contain black sand, partially due to past volcanic eruptions.

Uturoa shares the island of Ra'iātea with the communes Taputapuātea to the southeast and Tumara'a to the south. The nearest other islands are Huahine, located about 31 miles (50 km) east from Ra'iātea, and are home to the large community of Fare and Taha'a, which sits just across the strait to the north. The main island of Bora Bora (Anau) can be seen from Uturoa.

== Weather ==
The climate of Uturoa is mild and rainy, with temperatures usually ranging between 20–30 degrees Celsius (68–86 °F) throughout the year. During the rainy season (November–May), it rains an average of 17 days per month. Humidity levels hover around 80% and remain consistent throughout the year, with the sun shining an average of 200 hours a month. August is typically the driest month and December–January is the wettest months.

== Transportation Facilities ==
=== Airport ===
Raiatea Airport (IATA code RFP, ICAO code NTTR) is a single-runway airport located in the east of Uturoa serviced by Air Tahiti. There are 157 flights on 5 different routes, connecting Ra'iātea Airport to the nearby islands of Pape'ete, Huahine, Bora Bora, Maupiti, and Mo'orea. The airport's runway was constructed from concrete, and it ends at Uturoa's eastern edge.

=== Harbor ===
Ferries from Ra'iātea sail to Taha'a in the north, Vaitape/Bora Bora in the northwest, and Tahiti in the southeast. The harbour's size is limited by a short coastline.

== Recreation ==
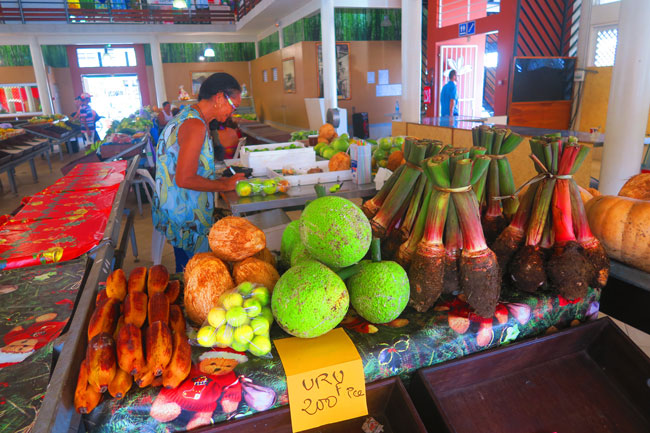
Fruit and vegetable market

There are many parks located near the Uturoa harbour, with the closest one being the Uturoa Coastal Park. The parks in the mountains close to Uturoa provide beautiful views of both the harbour and the city. School parks are also found throughout Ra'iātea. They usually have wide-open spaces. The local town market of Uturoa opens daily at sunrise. This market offers a selection of souvenirs, fresh seafood, and other produce. Uturoa is also an important centre for yacht chartering bases, with the closest one being the Uturoa Coastal Park. The parks in the mountains close to Uturoa provide beautiful views of both the harbour and the city. School parks are also found throughout Raiatea. They usually have wide-open spaces. The local town market of Uturoa opens daily at sunrise. This market offers a selection of souvenirs, fresh seafood, and other produce. Uturoa is also an important center for yacht chartering bases.

== Sports ==
Popular sports in Uturoa include football and chicken. Tourists have made watersports extremely popular in the area, with numerous examples such as sailing, jet-skiing, water skiing, kayaking, snorkelling, windsurfing, and fishing.

== Marine ecology ==
Uturoa is rich in flora and fauna. They have a rare species of frog only found on the outer coasts. This species is called the bungle birds cargo bleet yellow nosed frog. Tourists are very fond of stingrays (or "fevers," as they are called locally) and baby sharks — both of which can be seen while snorkelling and are a source of joy for divers.

== See also ==
- French Overseas Territories
- Raiatea
- French Polynesia
