= Faie =

- Associated commune of Huahine
- Location within French Polynesia
- Location of Faie
- Coordinates: 16°45′21″S 150°59′1″W
- Country: France
- Overseas collectivity: French Polynesia
- Subdivision: Leeward Islands
- Commune: Huahine
- Population (2022): 438
- Time zone: UTC−10:00

Faie is an associated commune located in the commune of Huahine on the island of the same name, in French Polynesia.
