= Marcelin Lisan =

French Polynesian politician (born 1960)

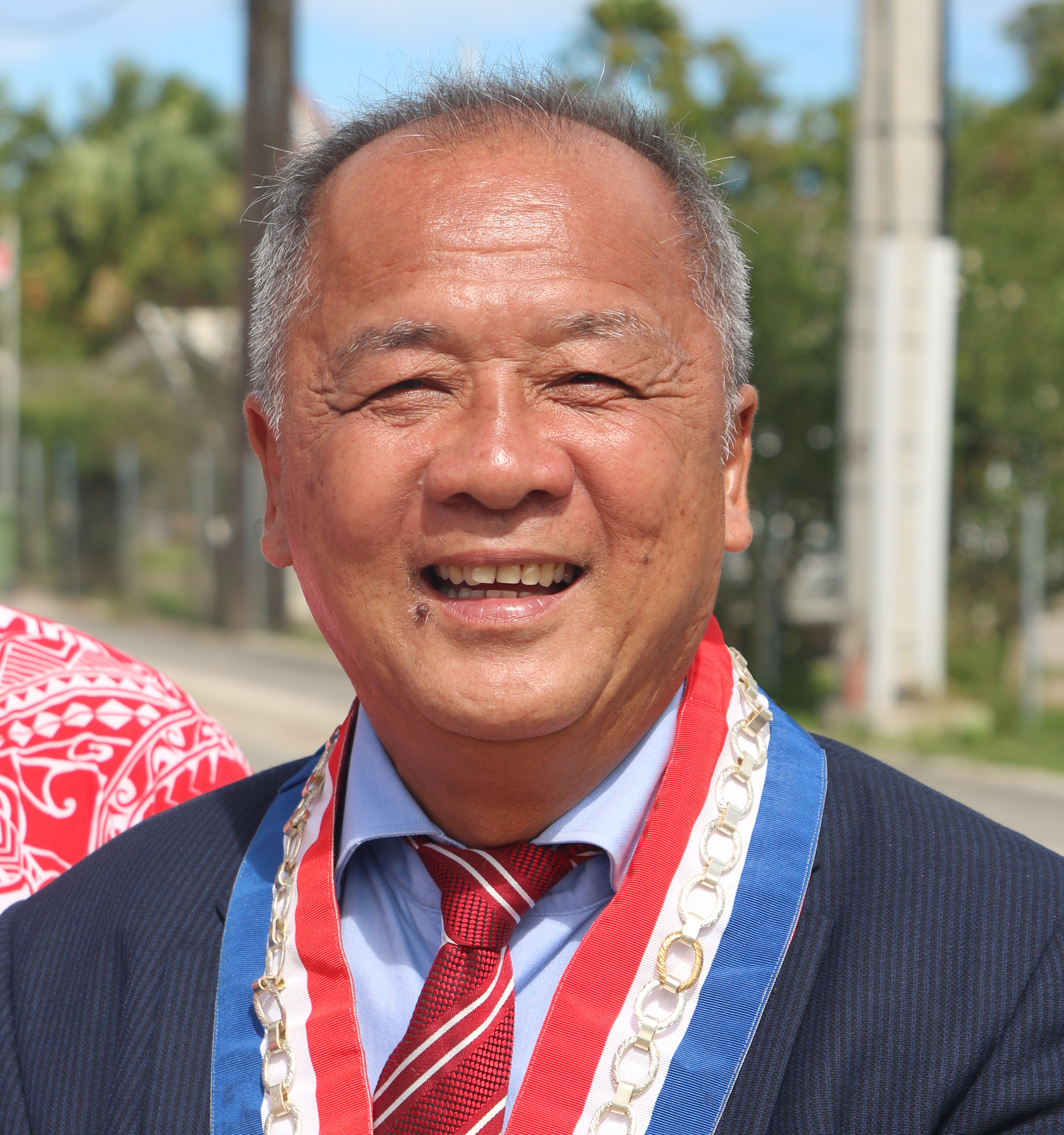

Mayor of Huahine
- In office March 2001 – 1 April 2008
- Succeeded by: Félix Faatau
- Incumbent
- Assumed office March 2014
- Preceded by: Félix Faatau

Representative of Huahine to the Assembly of French Polynesia
- In office May 2004 – 4 May 2013
- Succeeded by: Félix Faatau

Personal details
- Born: 15 February 1960 (age 66) Fare, French Polynesia
- Children: Marc, Heiana, Michael

Marcelin Lisan (born 15 February 1960) is the mayor of Huahine, French Polynesia and was the representative of Huahine to the Territorial Assembly of French Polynesia from May 2004 to 4 May 2013. He was mayor of Huahine from 2001 to 2008, and was succeeded by Félix Faatau. He was again elected as mayor of Huahine in March 2014.

== Early life and career ==
Lisan was born in Fare, Huahine. He did his primary schooling in Fare, then went to college at Collége La Mennais in Papeete. Instead of going with his parents to New Caledonia, he decided to return to his native island of Huahine to manage the family business (general and fuel power supply).

He managed to diversify the business by creating a car rental company and a bakery. His passion for big game fishing led him to founding the "Fare Nui Fishing Club," and has been its chairman since it was established.

=== Political career ===
He participated in the municipal elections in March 2001 and was elected as mayor of the commune of Huahine for the 2001–2008 mandate. In May 2004, he participated in the territorial elections and was elected to be the representative of Huahine to the Territorial Assembly of French Polynesia.

He was elected again to be the mayor of Huahine in March 2014.
