= Tupai =

Atoll in French Polynesia

Coordinates: 16°17′S 151°50′W

Tūpai
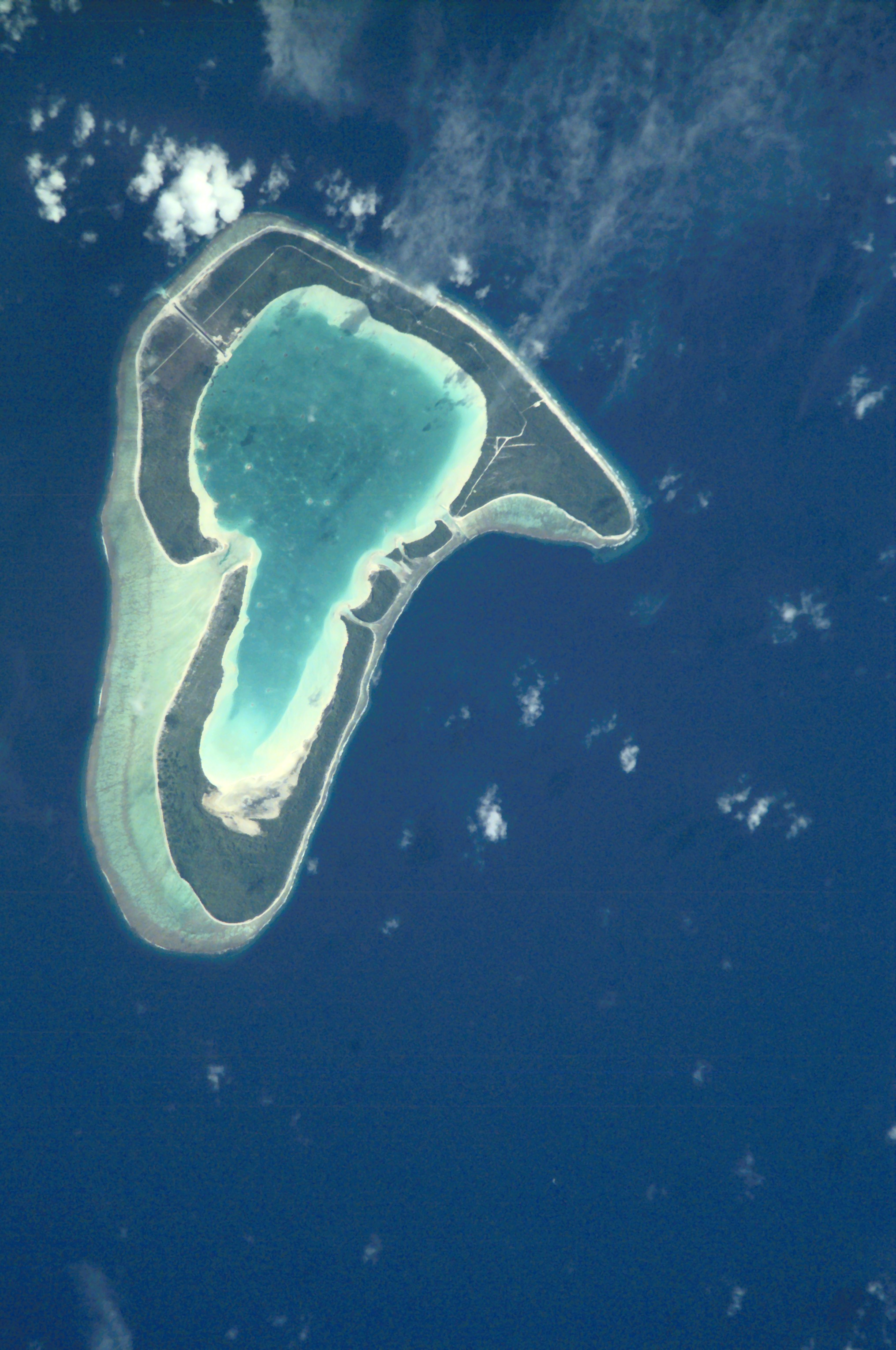
- NASA picture of Tūpai

Geography
- Location: Pacific Ocean
- Archipelago: Society Islands
- Area: 11 km^{2} (4.2 sq mi)

Administration
- France
- Overseas collectivity: French Polynesia
- Administrative subdivision: Leeward Islands
- Commune: Bora-Bora

Demographics
- Population: 0 (permanent)

Tūpai (Tahitian: Tūpai), also called Motu Iti, is a low-lying atoll in the Society Islands, French Polynesia. It lies 19 km to the north of Bora Bora and belongs to the western Leeward Islands (French: Îles Sous-le-vent). This small atoll is only 11 km^{2} in size. Its broad coral reef encloses a shallow sandy lagoon. There are almost continuous long wooded motus on Tūpai's reef. Tūpai has no permanent residents other than some workers on its coconut plantations. A private airfield was inaugurated on Tūpai in 2001, and its use is restricted.

== Administration ==
The atoll of Tūpai belongs administratively to the commune of Bora Bora.

In 1926, the island was considered for settling a small community of Slovak colonists, but was later dropped in favor of the Marquesas Islands.
