= Félix Faatau =

French Polynesian politician

Representative of Huahine to the Assembly of French Polynesia
- Incumbent
- Assumed office 5 May 2013
- Preceded by: Marcelin Lisan

Mayor of Huahine
- In office March 2008 – March 2014
- Preceded by: Marcelin Lisan
- Succeeded by: Marcelin Lisan

Personal details
- Born: 25 May 1947 (age 77); Maeva, French Polynesia
- Spouse: Elvira Guilloux
- Children: Maeva, Murielle, Mataiarii

Félix Faatau (born 25 May 1947) is the representative from Huahine to the Assembly of French Polynesia since 5 May 2013. He was the mayor of Huahine, French Polynesia from 2008 to 2014.
