= Fare, French Polynesia =

Fare
- Associated commune of Huahine
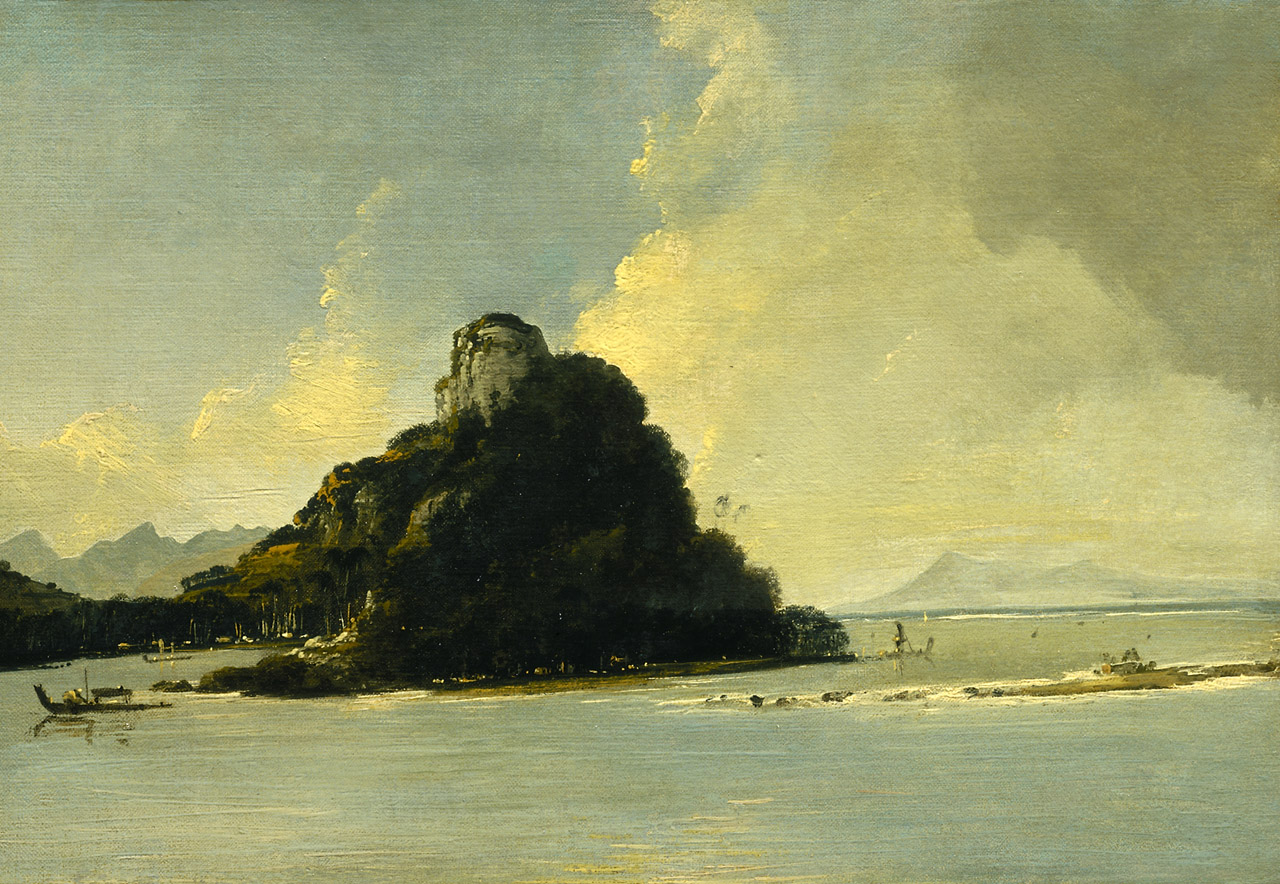
- View of the harbor of Fare in a painting from William Hodges, 1773

- Location within French Polynesia
- Location of Fare
- Coordinates: 16°44′0″S 151°2′0″W
- Country: France
- Overseas collectivity: French Polynesia
- Subdivision: Leeward Islands
- Commune: Huahine
- Population (2022): 1,600
- Time zone: UTC−10:00

Fare is an associated commune located in the commune of Huahine on the island of the same name, in French Polynesia.
