= Auna (missionary) =

Tahitian missionary

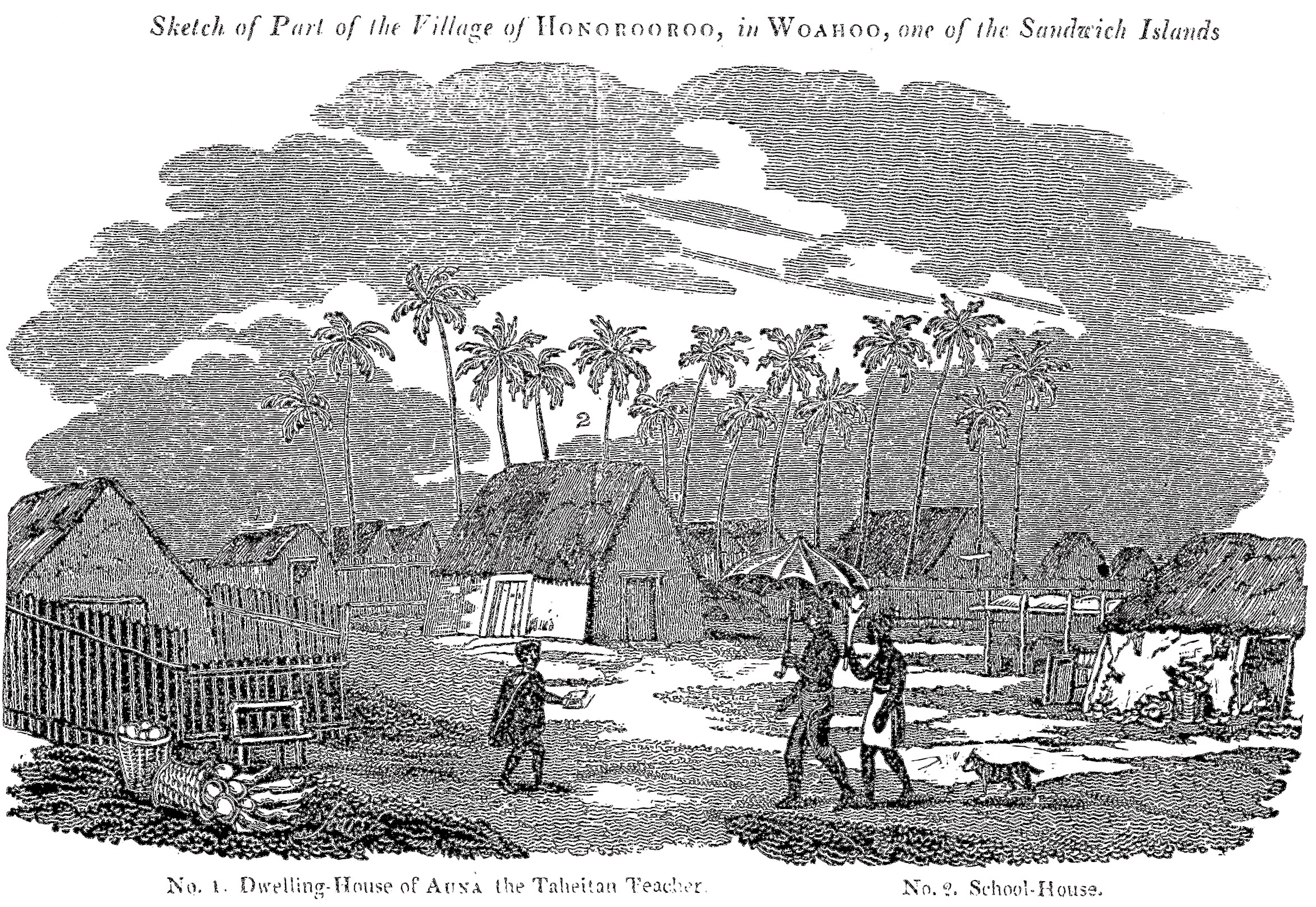
Honolulu in 1824, with Auna's dwelling house in the background

Auna (c. 1790 – 1835) was a Tahitian missionary to Hawaii. A chief of Raiatea, he was one of the first Tahitians to be converted by the London Missionary Society's work in the Society Islands; he then became a deacon on Huahine. In April 1822, he was sent with six other Tahitian Christians as a missionary to Hawaii, in response to a request from the American Board of Commissioners for Foreign Missions, who wanted assistance for their missionaries who were working in the island group. Auna continued working in Hawaii until March 1824, when he returned to the Society Islands. Auna's journal continues to be used as a source by historians and anthropologists.
