= Patio, Taha'a =

Coordinates: 16°35′00″S 151°29′45″W

Pātio is the main village on the island of Taha'a, French Polynesia.
