= Leeward Islands (Society Islands) =

Archipelago in French Polynesia

Coordinates: 17°32′S 149°50′W

Native name: Îles Sous-le-Vent (French) Fenua Raro Mata’i (Tahitian)
- Flag of the Leeward Islands

Geography
- Location: Pacific Ocean
- Archipelago: Society Islands
- Total islands: 9
- Major islands: Raiatea; Bora Bora; Huahine; Tahaa
- Area: 404 km^{2} (156 sq mi)
- Highest elevation: 1,017 m (3337 ft)
- Highest point: Tefatua

Administration
- France
- Overseas collectivity: French Polynesia
- Largest settlement: Uturoa (pop. 8,735, urban)

Demographics
- Population: 36,007 (Aug. 2022 census)
- Pop. density: 89/km^{2} (231/sq mi)

The Leeward Islands (French: îles Sous-le-Vent, pronounced [il suləvɑ̃], lit. 'Under-the-Wind Islands'; Tahitian: Fenua Raro Mata’i) are the western part of the Society Islands in French Polynesia, an overseas collectivity of France, in the South Pacific Ocean. They lie south of the Line Islands (part of Kiribati), east of the Cooks and north of the Austral Islands (also part of French Polynesia). Their area is around 404 km^{2} (156 sq mi) and their population is over 36,000.

== History ==
The first European to encounter the archipelago was British naval officer James Cook on 12 April 1769 during a British expedition the purpose of which was to observe the transit of Venus. He later revisited the islands twice more. It is a common misconception that he named the Leeward group of islands "Society" in honor of the Royal Society. However, Cook recorded in his journal that he named the islands "Society" because they lie close to each other.

In 1840, France declared a protectorate over Tahiti. In 1847, the British and French signed the Jarnac Convention and these islands became a colony of France in 1888 (eight years after the Windward Islands did). There were many native resistance movements and conflicts in reaction to this annexation, known as the Leewards War, which continued until 1897.

== Geography ==
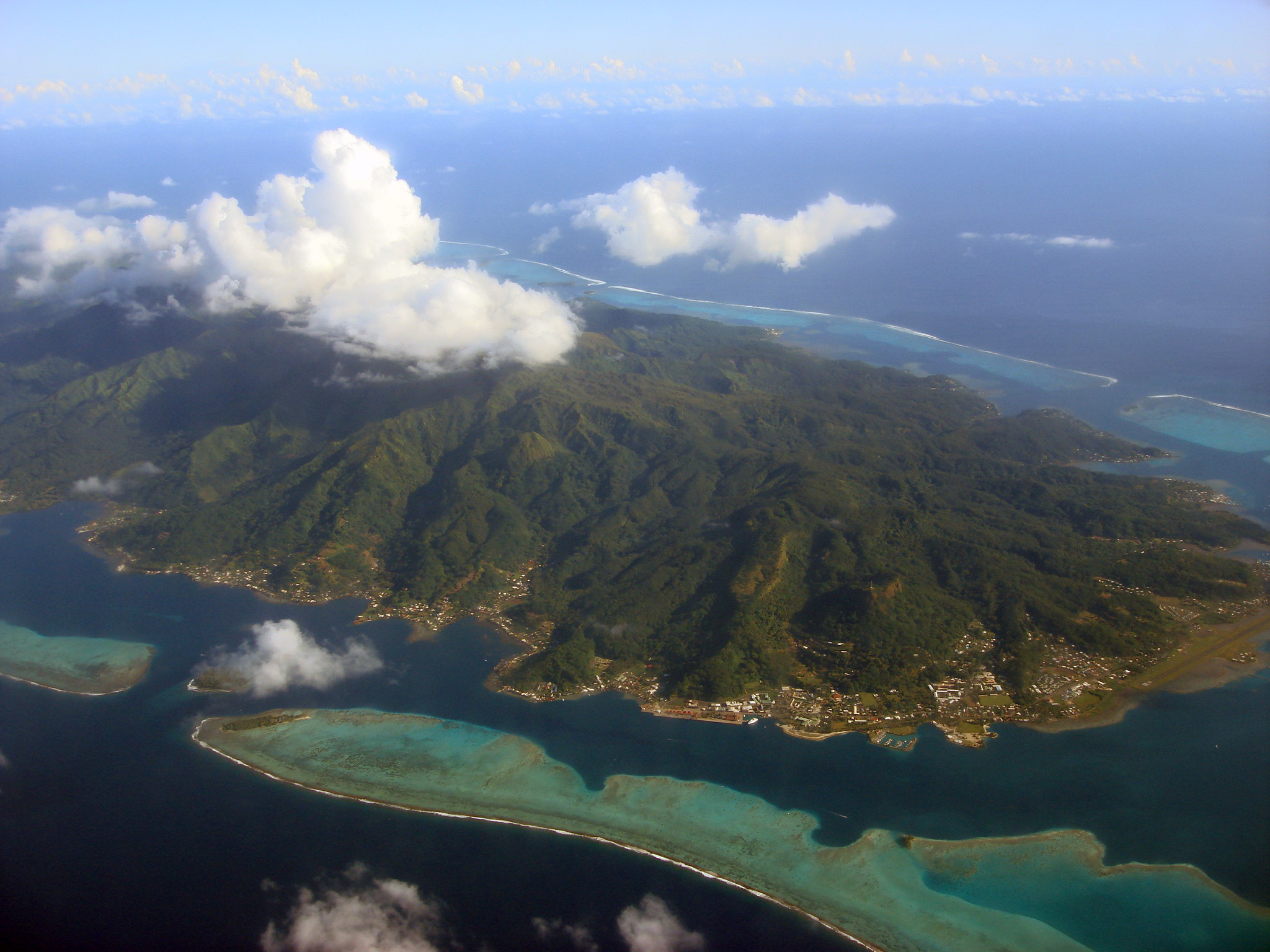
View of Raiatea island from a plane

The islands are mountainous, consisting of volcanic rock. They are formed of trachyte, dolerite, and basalt. There are raised coral beds high up the mountains, and lava occurs in a variety of forms, even in solid flows. Volcanic activity ceased so long ago that the craters have been almost entirely obliterated by erosion.

The Leeward Islands that lie more to the east are a mainly volcanic island cluster:

- Bora Bora, known for its tourism industry and World War II-era United States naval base
- Huahine, the easternmost island of the group; split at high tide into the northern Huahine Nui ("big Huahine") and southern Huahine Iti ("small Huahine")
- Maupiti
- Tupai atoll
- Raiatea (Tahitian: Havaʻi or Ioretea), the largest island in the group, holding the archipelago's administrative center (Uturoa) and tallest point (Mount Tefatua)
- Tahaʻa (Tahitian: Uporu), which lies just north of Uturoa

The westernmost Leeward Islands comprise a three atoll group: Manuae (also known as Scilly Atoll); Motu One atoll (also known as Bellinghausen), the most northerly of the Leeward Islands; and Maupihaa atoll (also known as Mopelia) to the southeast.

== Flora and fauna ==
Flora includes breadfruit, pandanus, and coconut palms. The limited terrestrial fauna includes feral pigs, rats, and small lizards. There are several species of freshwater fish inhabiting the small streams on the islands, and the fringing coral reefs around the islands contain a dazzling array of fish and other salt-water-dwelling species.

== Administration ==
The archipelago comprises an administrative division (French: subdivision administrative) of French Polynesia. The capital of the Leeward Islands administrative subdivision is Uturoa. The Leeward Islands (subdivision administrative des Îles Sous-le-vent) are one of French Polynesia's five administrative subdivisions. The administrative subdivision is coextensive with the electoral district of the Leeward Islands, one of French Polynesia's six electoral districts for the Assembly of French Polynesia.

Uturoa, Tumaraa, and Taputapuatea communes are all on Raiatea island.

Islands and communes of the Leeward Islands of French Polynesia
| Commune | Land area (km^{2}) | Population (2017 census) | Population (2022 census) | Density (per km^{2}) | Notes |
|---|---|---|---|---|---|
| Maupiti | 21.7 | 1,286 | 1,302 | 59.9 | Primarily the island of Maupiti, but includes 3 atolls to the west of Maupiti (Maupihaa, Manuae and Motu One). |
| Bora Bora | 41.55 | 10,549 | 10,758 | 258.9 | Consists of the 3 associated communes of Nunue, Faanui and Anau; includes Tupai Atoll (11 km^{2}, 4.2 sq mi) to the north with no permanent inhabitants |
| Tahaʻa | 90.2 | 5,234 | 5,296 | 58.7 | Consists of the 8 associated communes of Faʻaʻaha, Haʻamene, Hipu, Iripau, Niua, Ruutia, Tapuamu and Vaitoare. |
| Uturoa | 16.0 | 3,778 | 3,663 | 229.5 | Administrative centre of the Leeward Islands; town is situated at the northern tip of Raiatea Island. |
| Tumaraa | 71.9 | 3,721 | 3,718 | 51.7 | Consists of the 4 associated communes of Fetuna, Tevaitoa (the location of the commune administration), Tehurui and Vaiaʻau, forming the west side of Raiatea Island. |
| Taputapuatea | 84.4 | 4,792 | 5,007 | 59.3 | Consists of the 3 associated communes of Avera (the location of the commune administration), Opoa and Puohine, forming the east side of Raiatea Island. |
| Huahine | 74.8 | 6,075 | 6,258 | 83.7 | Consists of the 8 associated communes of Fare (the location of the commune administration), Faie, Fitii and Maeva, all on Huahine Nui; and Haʻapū, Maroe, Parea and Tefarerii on Huahine Iti. |
| Total | 404.0 | 35,393 | 36,007 | 89.1 | |

Six of the seven communes (out of French Polynesia's 48 communes) have banded together in a "community of communes" (French: communauté de communes Havaʻi, CCH) an indirectly elected intercommunal council formed in 2012 by all the communes in the administrative subdivision (circumscription) of the Leeward Islands, with the exception of Bora-Bora, which preferred to remain separate for financial reasons. Unlike in metropolitan France and its overseas regions, it is not mandatory for the communes in French Polynesia to join an intercommunal council. The three intercommunal councils in existence as of 2022 (including the CCH), all formed on a voluntary basis.

== Tourism ==
Tourism is the mainstay of the economy. Agriculturally, the major products are copra, sugar, rum, mother-of-pearl, and vanilla.
