= Tahaʻa =

Island in French Polynesia

- Commune
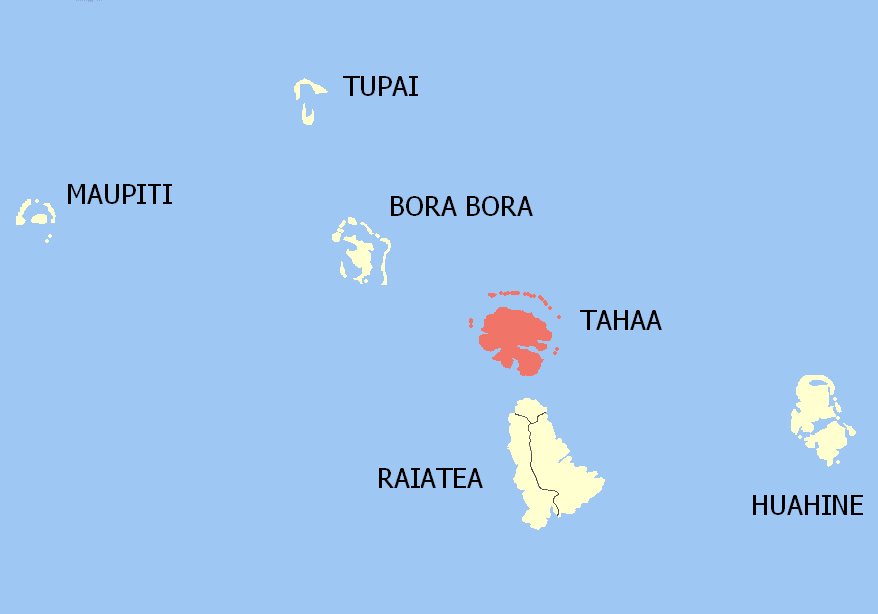
- Location of the commune (in red) within the Leeward Islands
- Location of Tahaʻa
- Coordinates: 16°37′00″S 151°30′00″W
- Country: France
- Overseas collectivity: French Polynesia
- Subdivision: Leeward Islands

Government
  - Mayor (2020–2026): Patricia Amaru
- Area^{1}: 90.2 km^{2} (34.8 sq mi)
- Highest elevation: 590 m (1,940 ft)
- Lowest elevation: 0 m (0 ft)
- Population (2022): 5,296
  - Density: 58.7/km^{2} (152/sq mi)
- Time zone: UTC−10:00
- INSEE/Postal code: 98745 /98733
- ^{1} French Land Register data, which excludes lakes, ponds, glaciers > 1 km^{2} (0.386 sq mi or 247 acres) and river estuaries.

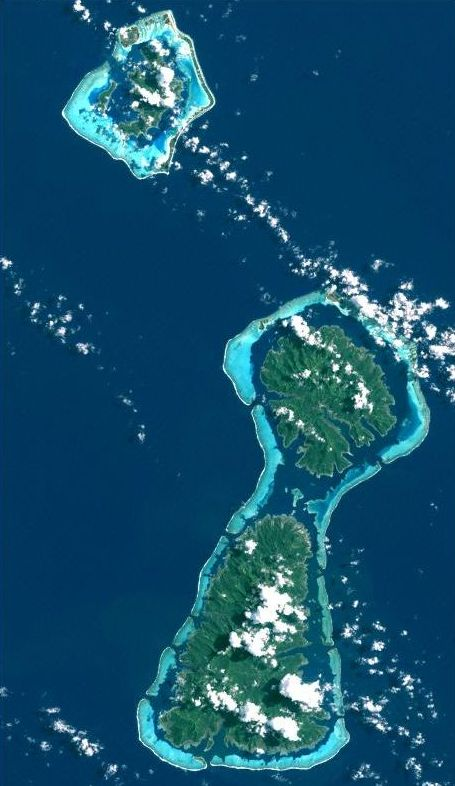
Bora Bora, Tahaʻa, and Raiatea from space

Tahaʻa (sometimes spelled as Tahaa) is an island located among the western group, the Leeward Islands, of the Society Islands in French Polynesia, an overseas territory of France in the South Pacific Ocean. The islands of Tahaʻa and neighboring Raiatea to the immediate south are enclosed by the same coral reef, and they may once have been a single island. At the 2022 census it had a population of 5,296. The island has an area of 90 square kilometres (35 square miles). Mount Ohiri is the highest mountain on the island standing at 590 metres (1,940 ft) above sea level. It is also known as the "Vanilla Island" and produces pearls of exceptional quality.

== Etymology ==
Tahaʻa is spelled in Tahitian using the apostrophe (in fact a variant of it, the okina, hard to differentiate from the regular apostrophe when using small fonts) to represent the glottal stop, as promoted by the Académie Tahitienne and accepted by the territorial government. This apostrophe, however, is often omitted. In old travelogues, the transcription Oataha is sometimes used.

== History ==
Tahaʻa was formerly called Uporu, after the island of Upolu in Samoa. Due to its proximity to Raiatea, it has been strongly dependent. But during the 18th and 19th centuries it was a strategic place in the conflict of rivalries between Raiatea and Bora Bora.

According to Polynesian legend, Tahaʻa and Raiatea were separated by the wagging tail of an eel, possessed by the spirit of a princess.

At the time of Captain Cook's visits in 1769 and 1773, the island was under the occupation of Bora Bora warriors.

In 1863 a Chilean ship that was in search of slaves was shipwrecked near the town of Tiva in the southwest of the island, some of the crew members stayed and adopted local wives, which gave rise to their descendants being called the "Spanish clan".

The island became a protectorate and then a French colony, and is now part of French Polynesia.

== Geography ==
There are numerous smaller islands in the reef surrounding Tahaʻa, particularly to the north. At least one of these islands, Moie, is privately owned.

=== Climate ===
Tahaʻa has a humid tropical maritime climate. In general, there are two main seasons:

The hot season, from November to April (the austral summer).

The cold season, from May to October (the austral winter).

=== Flora and fauna ===
Tahaʻa is covered with lush vegetation, mostly coconut trees.

Its waters are teeming with crabs, barracudas, gray sharks, Napoleon wrasses, dolphins, oysters and corals.

=== Demographics ===
The evolution of the number of inhabitants is known through the population censuses carried out in the municipality since 1971. The law on local democracy of February 27, 2002, in its articles on the population census, introduced population censuses every five years in New Caledonia, French Polynesia, Mayotte and the Wallis and Futuna Islands, which was not the case before.

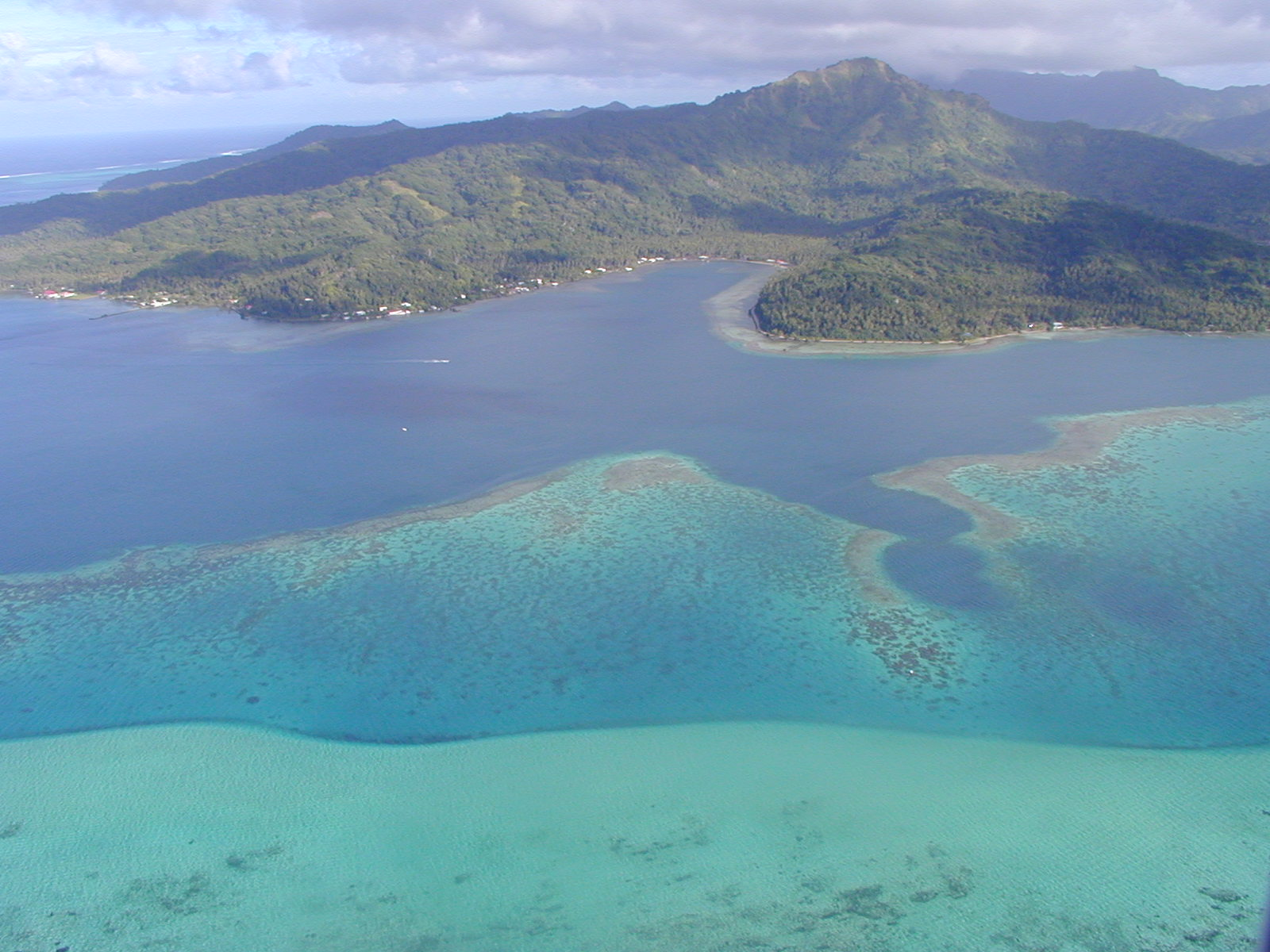
Aerial view of Tahaʻa Island

For the municipality, the first comprehensive census under the new system was conducted in 2002, previous censuses having been conducted in 1996, 1988, 1983, 1983, 1977 and 1971.

Historical population
Year	Pop.	±%
2002	4,781	—
2007	5,003	+4.6%
2012	5,220	+4.3%
2017	5,234	+0.3%
2022	5,296	+1.2%

== Administration ==
Administratively, Tahaʻa and the surrounding islets emerging from the coral reef form a commune (municipality) part of the administrative subdivision of the Leeward Islands. Tahaʻa consists of the following associated communes:

- Faaaha
- Haamene
- Hipu
- Iripau
- Niua
- Ruutia
- Tapuamu
- Vaitoare

The administrative centre of the commune of Tahaʻa is the settlement of Patio.

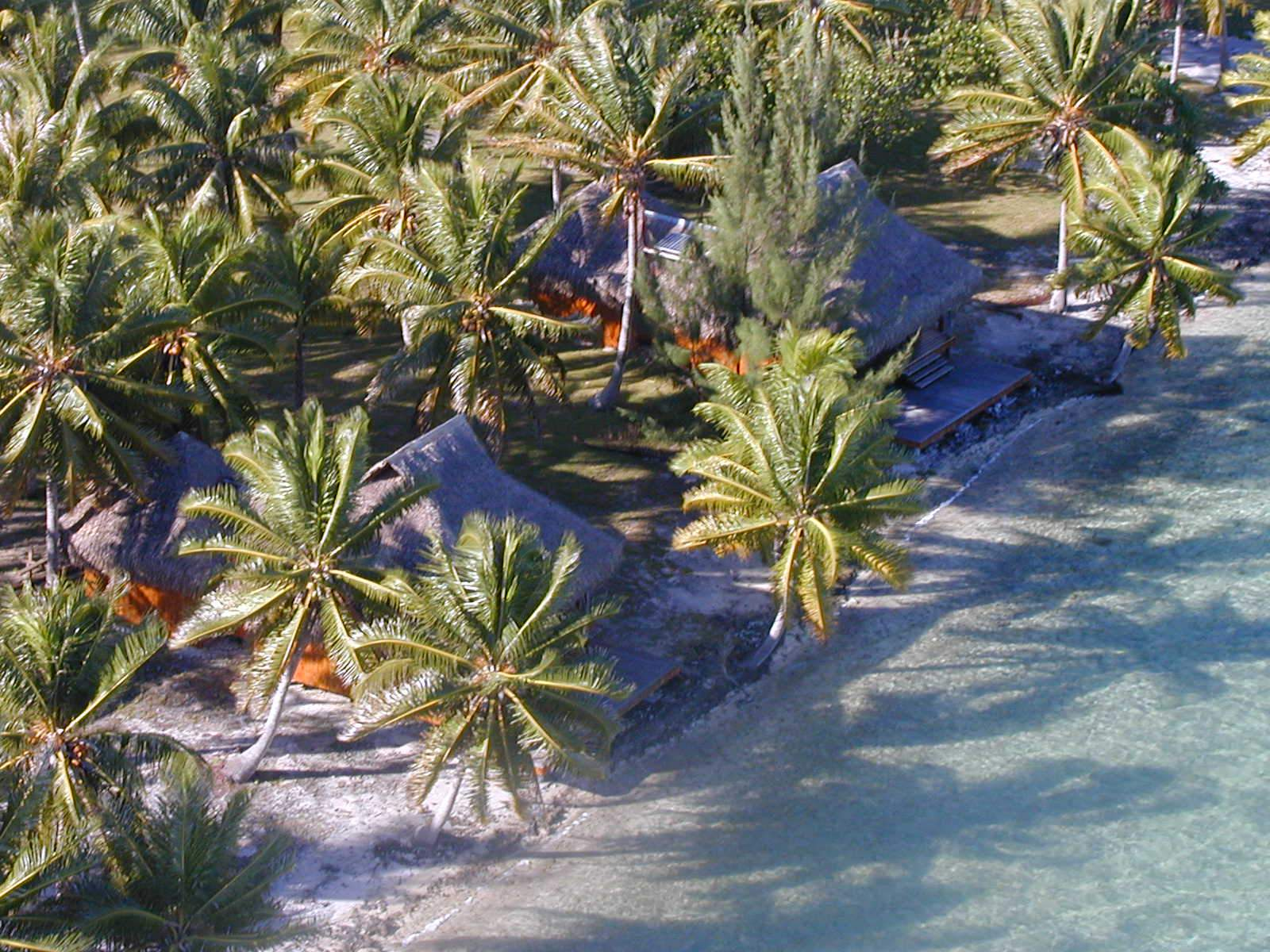
Tahaʻa bungalows

== Economy ==
Like most Polynesian islands, Tahaʻa bases its economy essentially on fishing and tourism: on the motu (the thin strips of land rising from the coral reef) that surround it, especially in the north, there are numerous hotels and tourist villages, generally made up of fares or bungalows connected by wooden walkways.

Tahaʻa is world famous for its vanilla production, which accounts for about 80% of all Polynesian production. The island specifically cultivates the Vanilla tahitensis variety, obtained by crossing the pods of Vanilla planifolia with those of Vanilla pompona. The aroma of vanilla is so unmistakable in the air that Tahaʻa is also known as "Vanilla Island."

Another source of income for locals is the harvesting of black pearls, facilitated by the abundance of oysters in the island's bays.

Thanks to the lush coconut forest, copra production is also a very important activity for the local economy.

== Transport ==
Tahaʻa and its small islets can be reached by boat and outrigger from Raiatea. The short sail drops visitors on an islet beach with a small lagoon, and in the near distance, a view of Bora Bora. These parts of the Society Islands are less modernized.

== Culture ==
An ancient tradition in Tahaʻa is "rock fishing" (tautai-taora in the local language), which was very popular, especially in the past, in the islands of Oceania. The fishermen sit in pairs in different canoes, all lined up a few dozen meters from the shore, inside the reef: in each boat, one fisherman stands at the bow and hits the surface of the sea with a large stone tied to a rope, while the other paddles towards the shore.

The fish, frightened by the noise, flee towards the shore, a few meters from where other fishermen (usually women) are waiting for them. These fishermen use their legs to prevent them from escaping and, when the fish come close, they catch them with their bare hands and load them into baskets or other canoes. Today, pebble fishing in Tahaʻa takes place mainly during the October festival: for the occasion, the fishing canoes are decorated with garlands of tiare, the traditional Polynesian flower.

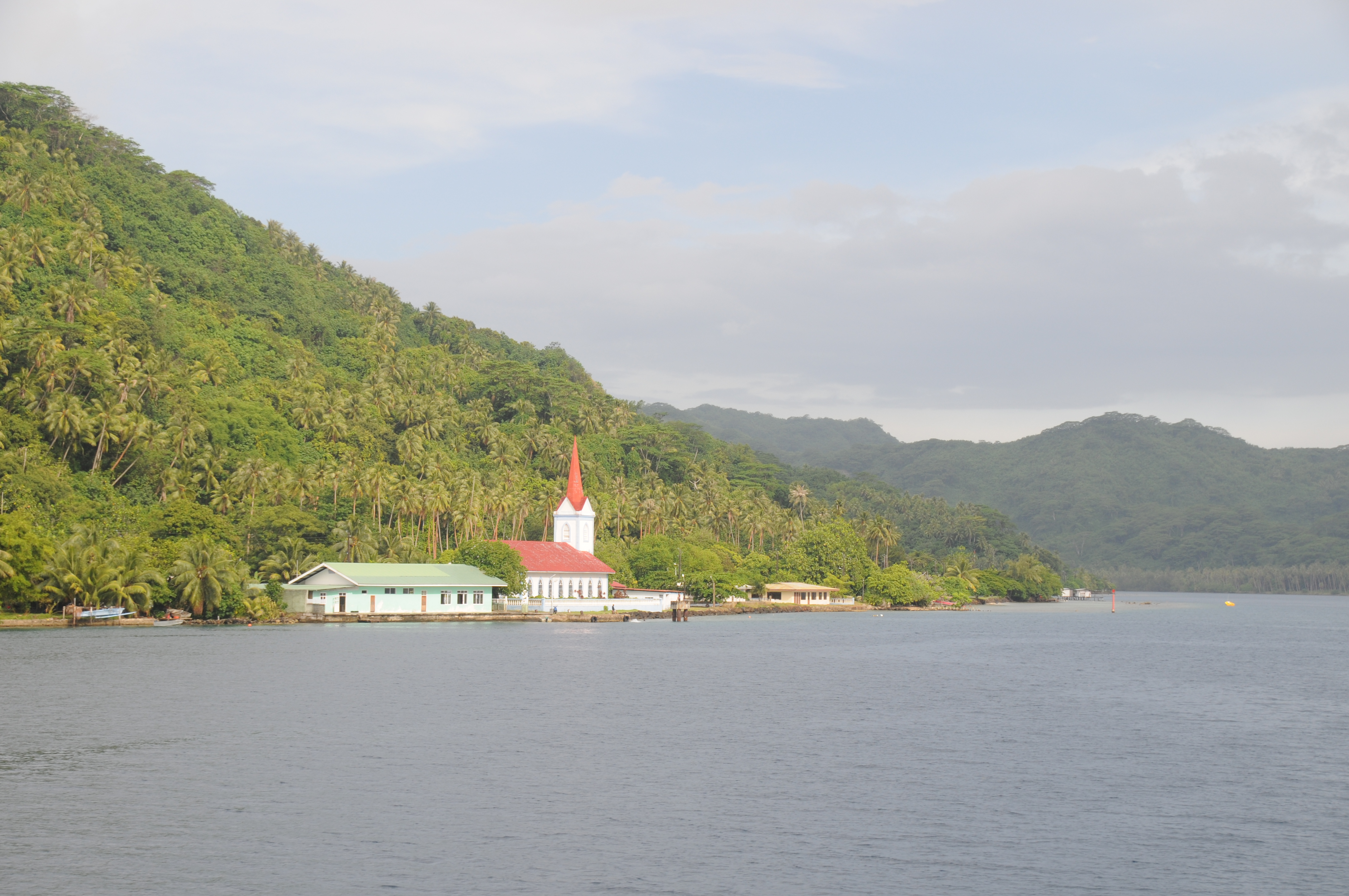
Church at Tiva, Tahaʻa

=== Religion ===
The majority of the population is affiliated with Christianity, a legacy of European colonization and the activity of missionary groups both from various Protestant groups and the Catholic Church. The Archdiocese of Papeete controls 2 churches on the island, the Church of Saint Clement in the town of Patio in the far north (Église de Saint-Clément) and the Church of Saint Peter Celestine in Poutoru in the far south (Église de Saint-Pierre-Célestin). There are also followers of the traditional Tahitian religion on the island.

=== Sports ===
In terms of sports, Tahaʻa is, along with Bora Bora, Raiatea and Huahine, one of the four islands among which the Hawaiki Nui Vaʻa, an international Polynesian canoe (vaʻa) competition, is held.

=== Languages ===
The official language is French, but the Tahitian language is more widely spoken in Tahiti than in Polynesia as a whole: 77% of the population speaks Tahitian in the family and more than 93% are fluent in it.
