= Taputapuatea =

Commune in French Polynesia, France

Taputapuātea
- Commune
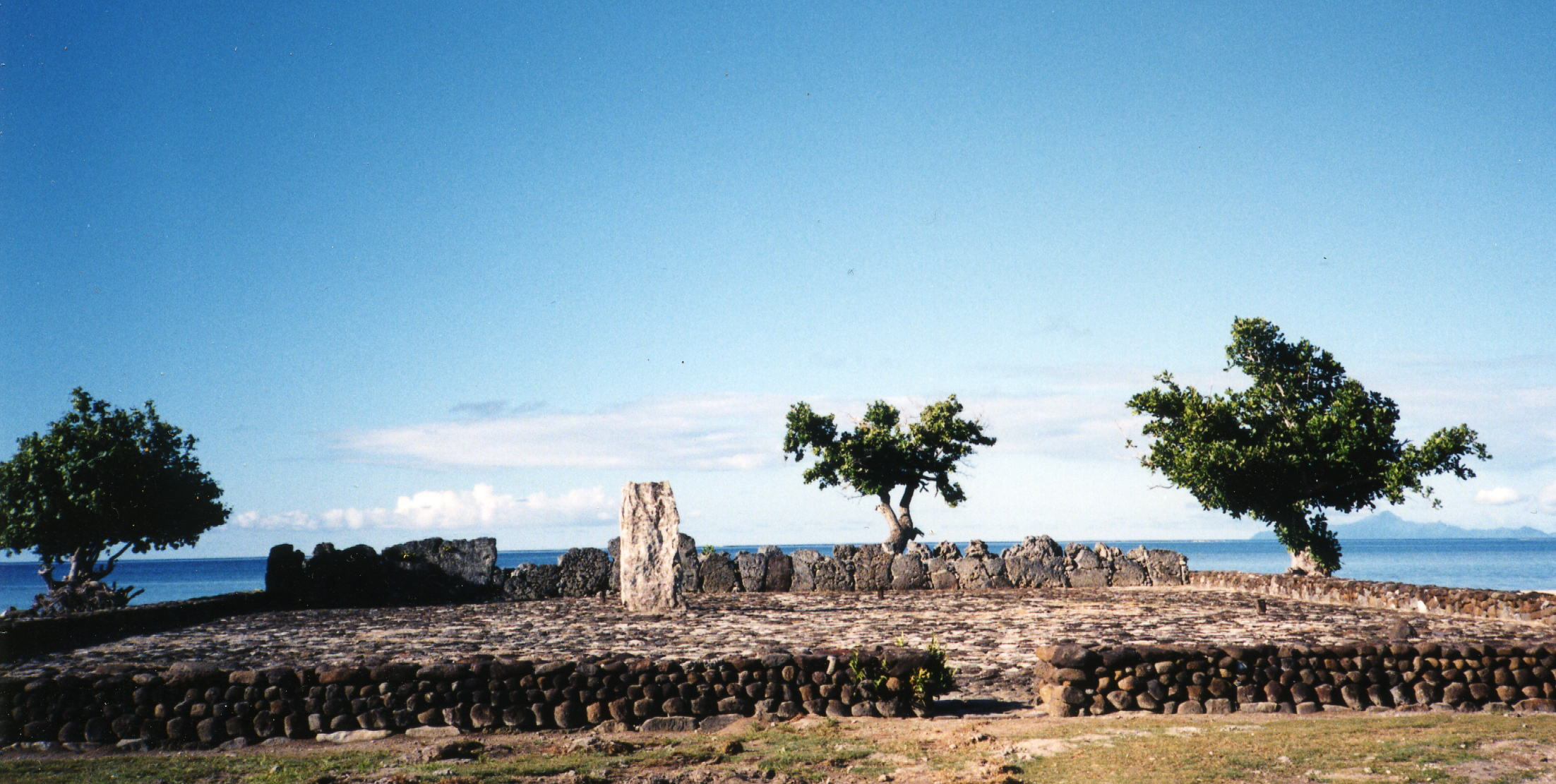
- View of the ancient marae at the archaeological complex of Taputapuātea, restored in 1994

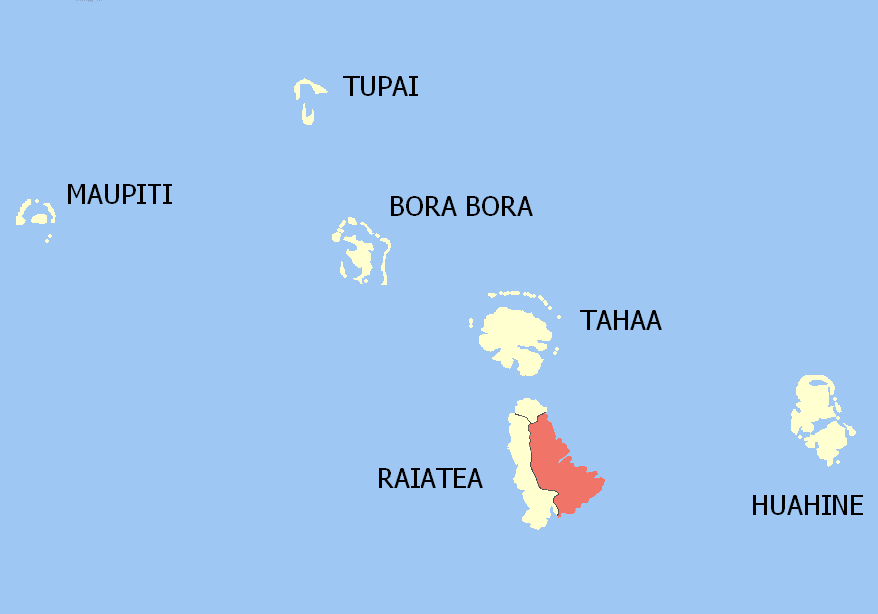
- Location of the commune (in red) within the Leeward Islands
- Location of Taputapuātea
- Coordinates: 16°50′15″S 151°21′32″W
- Country: France
- Overseas collectivity: French Polynesia
- Subdivision: Leeward Islands

Government
  - Mayor (2020–2026): Thomas Moutame
- Area^{1}: 88.5 km^{2} (34.2 sq mi)
- Highest elevation: 758 m (2,487 ft)
- Lowest elevation: 0 m (0 ft)
- Population (2022): 5,007
  - Density: 56.6/km^{2} (147/sq mi)
- Time zone: UTC−10:00
- INSEE/Postal code: 98750 /98735
- ^{1} French Land Register data, which excludes lakes, ponds, glaciers > 1 km^{2} (0.386 sq mi or 247 acres) and river estuaries.

Taputapuātea
UNESCO World Heritage Site
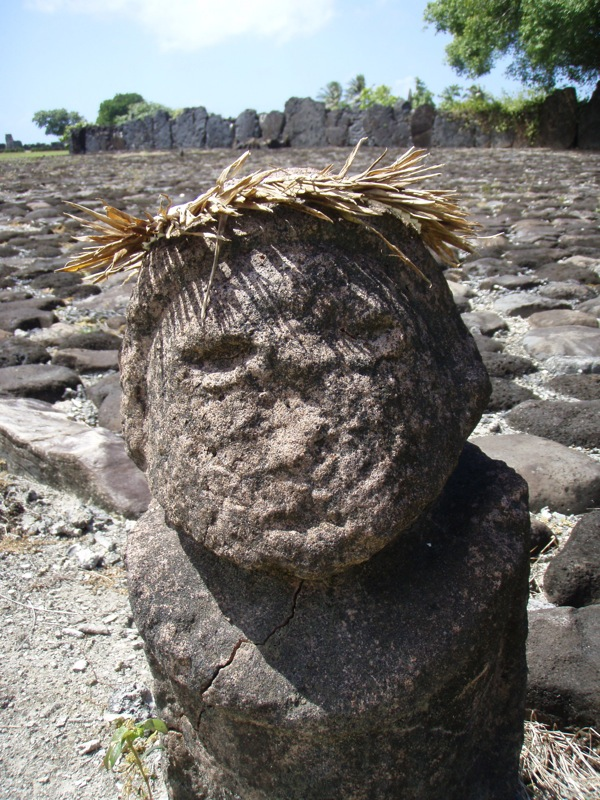
- Tiki on the marae at Taputapuātea

- Location within French Polynesia Location within Oceania
- Location: Raiatea, French Polynesia, France
- Criteria: Cultural: (iii)(iv)(vi)
- Reference: 1529
- Inscription: 2017 (41st Session)
- Area: 2,124 ha (5,250 acres)
- Buffer zone: 3,363 ha (8,310 acres)
- Coordinates: 16°50′29.04″S 151°22′20.56″W

Taputapuātea is a commune of French Polynesia, an overseas territory of France in the Pacific Ocean. The commune of Taputapuātea is located on the island of Raiatea, in the administrative subdivision of the Leeward Islands, themselves part of the Society Islands. At the 2022 census it had a population of 5,007. The commune was named after a large marae complex which was the religious center of eastern Polynesia for roughly 1000 years. The archaeological site of Taputapuatea marae is still today the most famous landmark of Raiatea, and it was inscribed on the UNESCO World Heritage List in 2017.

Taputapuātea consists of the following associated communes:

- Avera
- Opoa
- Puohine

The administrative centre of the commune is the settlement of Avera.

It was a major stop in the Polynesian Voyaging Society's sail of Hōkūleʻa across French Polynesia in mid 2025.
