= Tumaraa =

Commune in French Polynesia, France

Tumara'a
- Commune
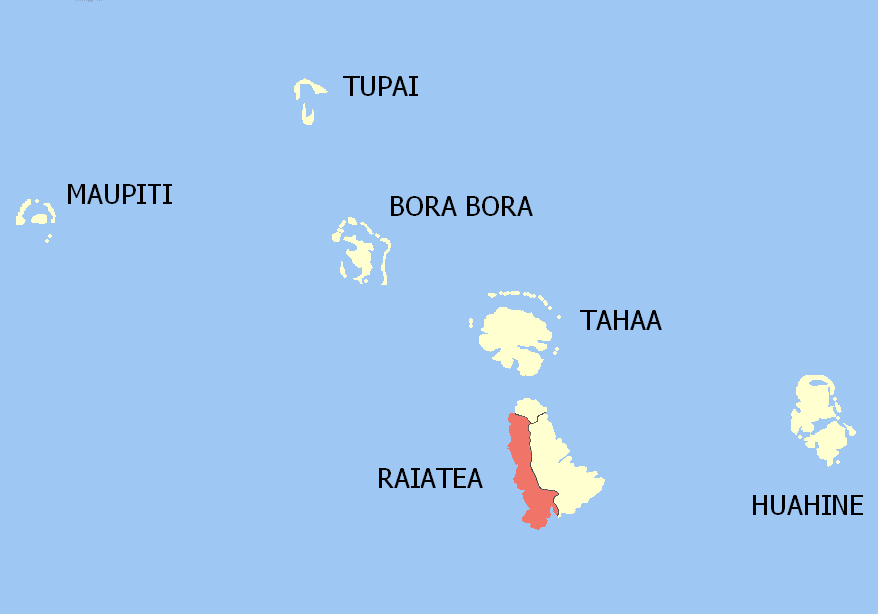
- Location of the commune (in red) within the Leeward Islands
- Location of Tumara'a
- Coordinates: 16°47′00″S 151°29′00″W
- Country: France
- Overseas collectivity: French Polynesia
- Subdivision: Leeward Islands

Government
  - Mayor (2020–2026): Cyril Tetuanui
- Area^{1}: 63.2 km^{2} (24.4 sq mi)
- Highest elevation: 1,017 m (3,337 ft)
- Lowest elevation: 0 m (0 ft)
- Population (2022): 3,718
  - Density: 58.8/km^{2} (152/sq mi)
- Time zone: UTC−10:00
- INSEE/Postal code: 98754 /98735
- ^{1} French Land Register data, which excludes lakes, ponds, glaciers > 1 km^{2} (0.386 sq mi or 247 acres) and river estuaries.

Tumara'a is a commune of French Polynesia, an overseas territory of France in the Pacific Ocean. The commune of Tumara'a is located on the island of Ra'iātea, in the administrative subdivision of the Leeward Islands, themselves part of the Society Islands. At the 2022 census it had a population of 3,718, making it the least populous commune on Ra'iātea.

Tumara'a consists of the following associated communes:

- Fetuna
- Tehurui
- Tevaitoa
- Vaia'au

The administrative centre of the commune is the settlement of Tevaitoa. The tallest mountain on Ra'iātea - Mont Temehani - is located within Tumara'a.
