= Huahine =

Island in French Polynesia

- Commune
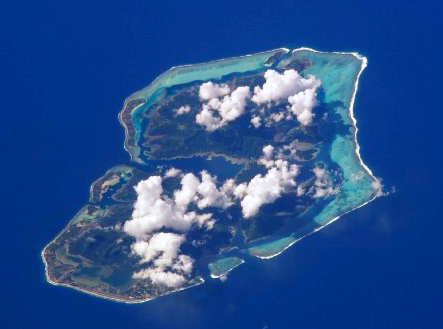
- NASA picture of Huahine viewed from the north

- Flag

- Location of Huahine
- Coordinates: 16°44′S 151°00′W
- Country: France
- Overseas collectivity: French Polynesia
- Subdivision: Leeward Islands

Government
  - Mayor (2020–2026): Marcelin Lisan
- Area^{1}: 75 km^{2} (29 sq mi)
- Highest elevation: 669 m (2,195 ft)
- Lowest elevation: 0 m (0 ft)
- Population (2022): 6,263
  - Density: 84/km^{2} (220/sq mi)
- Time zone: UTC-10:00
- INSEE/Postal code: 98724 /98731
- ^{1} French Land Register data, which excludes lakes, ponds, glaciers > 1 km^{2} (0.386 sq mi or 247 acres) and river estuaries.

Huahine is an island located among the Society Islands, in French Polynesia, an overseas territory of France in the South Pacific Ocean. It is part of the Leeward Islands group (Îles sous le Vent). At the 2022 census, it had a population of 6,263.

== History ==
Human presence on Huahine dates back at least a millennium, as evinced by the numerous Marae on the island. Archaeologists estimate that the ancient Tahitian Maʻohi people colonized Huahine from at least the 9th century AD. Huahine is home to one of the largest concentrations of Polynesian archaeological remains dated between 850 AD and 1100 AD.

=== Independent kingdom ===
Until the late 19th century, Huahine was an independent kingdom, also called the Huahine and Maiao Kingdom. According to tradition, three main dynasties succeeded each other:

The Hau-moʻo-rere dynasty was founded in the 17th century; its last representative was Queen Tehaʻapapa I, whom Captain Cook met in 1769. She maintained the cohesion and independence of her kingdom.

The Tamatoa dynasty has its origins in Tehaʻapapa I and her husband, Mato a Tamatoa, a member of the Tamatoa family of Raiatea. They were the founders of the Tamatoa branch of Huahine. This dynasty reigned until 1854.

The Teururaʻi dynasty descends from Ariʻimate Teururaʻi, a Huahine chief, and his wife Teriʻiteporouaraʻi Tamatoa, member of the Tamatoa family of Raiatea, great-granddaughter of Queen Tehaʻapapa I of Huahine. This dynasty reigned from 1854 to 1895.

The Polynesian prince Teriifaʻatau Marama could lay claim to the thrones of Huahine and Raiatea simultaneously. However, the union of these two thrones under one scepter was unacceptable to both kingdoms, so it was agreed that his younger brother would inherit the throne of Raiatea. In 1884, Teriifaʻatau Marama became prime minister, a post previously held by his younger brother, who had become King that year. Teriifaʻatau Marama became a principal figure in the annexation of the kingdom of Huahine and Maiao by France. It was in 1895 that the regent, on behalf of Queen Tehaapapa, and the principal chiefs of the kingdom fully renounced their powers and privileges in favor of France, in a treaty of abdication dated 15 September of that year. After the annexation, he was elected chief of Tefarerii, a position he held until his death.

=== European exploration and colonization ===
The name Huahine literally means "woman's sex". It could probably be translated as "pregnant woman" since the profile of Mount Tavaiura makes one think of a pregnant woman lying down.

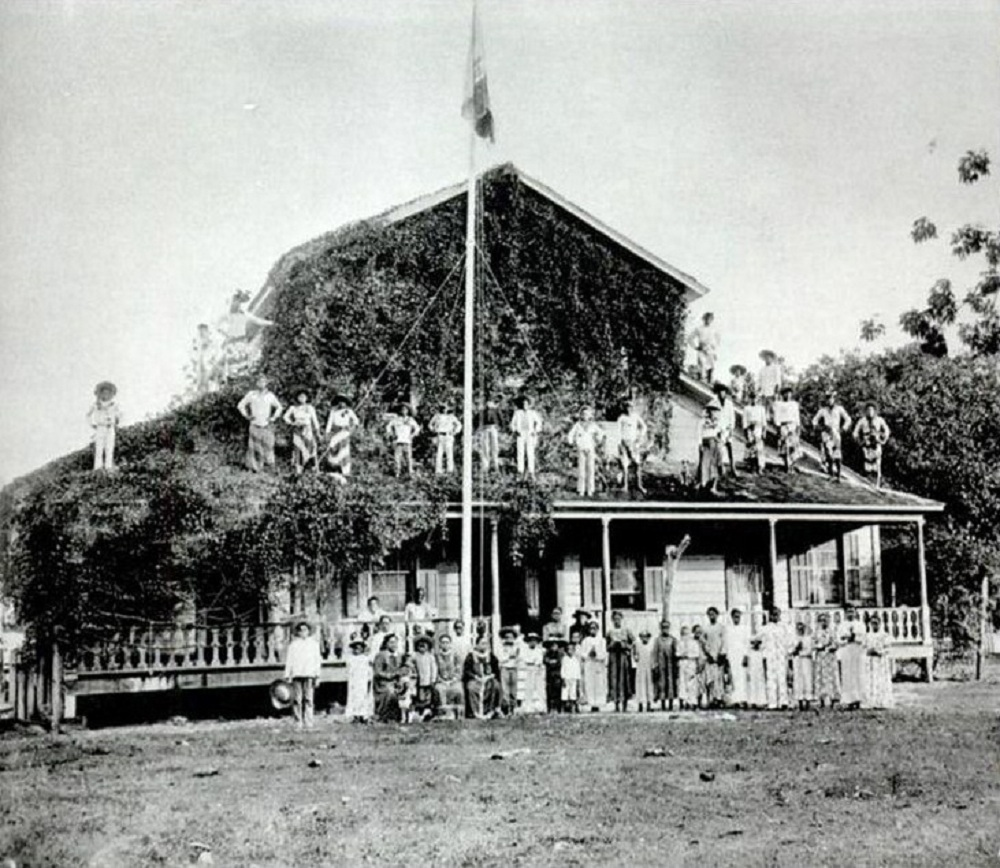
Royal residence of the Queen of Huahine at Fare

Captain James Cook arrived in Fare Harbour on 16 July 1769, with Tupaia navigating HMS Endeavour. They met with the leading chief, Ori (Mato). Cook returned on 3 September 1773 and met with Ori's son Teriʻitaria, the new ariʻi rahi of the island.

Missionary Auna served as a deacon on Huahine before his work in Hawaii.

The Spaniard Domingo Bonaechea in 1775, called the island "La Hermosa" (The Beautiful). Today it is known by the nickname "the island of the woman".

In 1846 the island successfully resisted French rule, the inhabitants never resigned themselves to the idea of being colonized and in 1847 the island proclaimed itself an independent state under the name of the Kingdom of Huahine.

On 20 April 1879, the commander of SMS Bismarck, Karl Deinhard, and the German Empire's consul for the South Sea Islands, Gustav Godeffroy Junior, signed a treaty of friendship and commerce with the island's government on behalf of the German Empire.

In 1888, the French finally established a protectorate over the Island. The island was formally annexed on 18 April 1888. French warships bombarded the two largest villages, causing some loss of life, in September 1890. The last queen, Te-haʻapapa III, was deposed, and the island incorporated into the French Establishments of Oceania, in 1895.

== Geography ==
Huahine measures 16 km (10 mi) in length, with a maximum width of 13 km (8 mi). It is made up of two main islands surrounded by a fringing coral reef with several islets, or motu. Huahine Nui (Big Huahine) lies to the north and Huahine Iti (Little Huahine) to the south. The total land area is 75 km^{2} (29 sq mi). The two islands are separated by a few hundred metres of water and joined by a sandspit at low tide. A small bridge was built to connect Huahine Nui and Huahine Iti. Its highest point is Turi at 669 m elevation.

In the northwest of Huahine Nui lies a 375-hectare (930-acre) brackish lake known as Lac Fauna Nui (Lac Maeva). This lake is all that remains of the ancient atoll lagoon. Air transportation is available via Huahine airport, located on the northern shore of Huahine Nui.

=== Flora and fauna ===
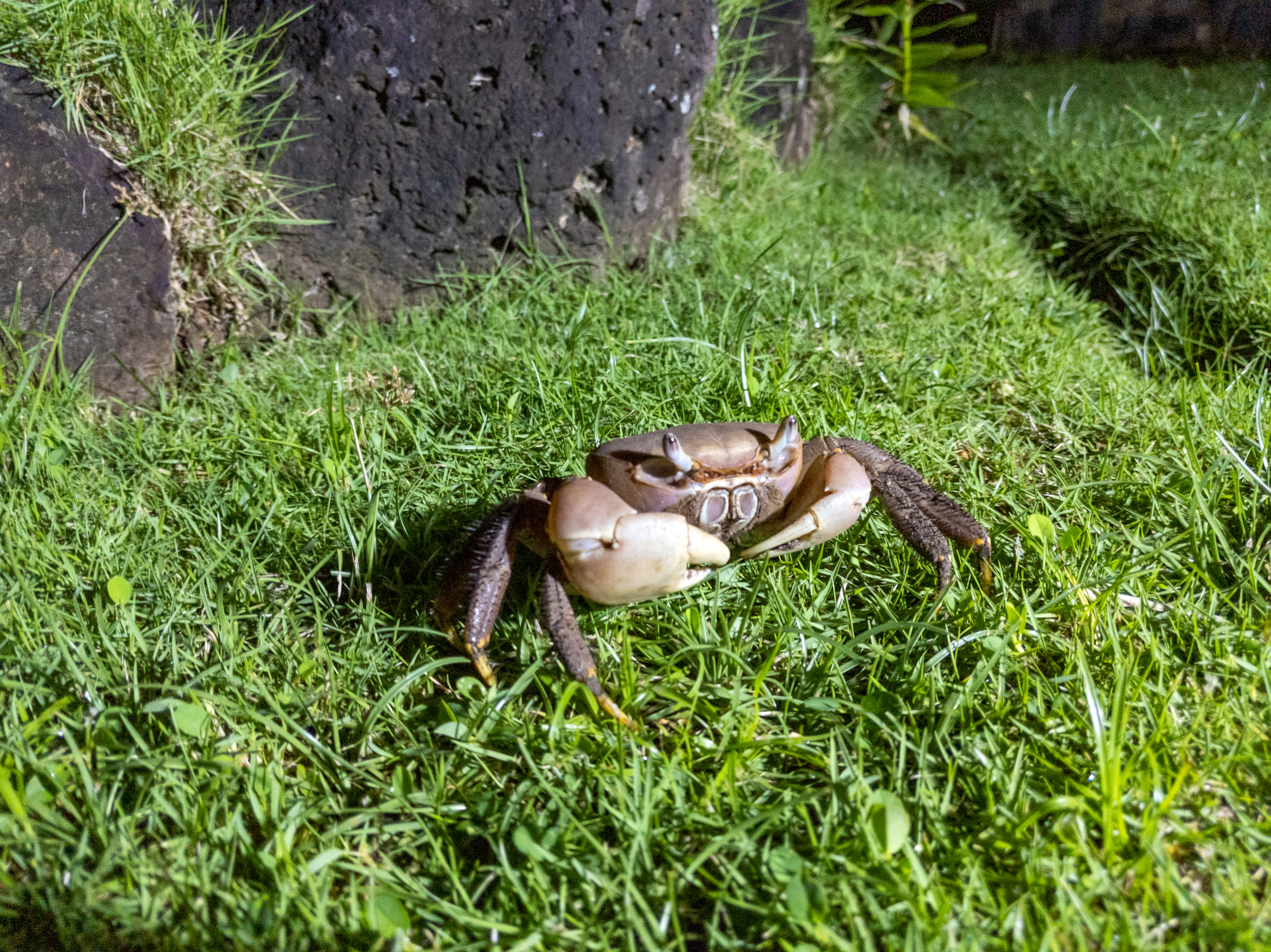
A crab on the island

The island is covered with lush vegetation, much of which consists of coconut palms. There are also two important botanical gardens: the Ariiura Garden Paradise, which houses traditional Polynesian medicinal plants, and l'Eden Parc, which cultivates fruit trees from around the world.

The fauna is especially rich in fish and birds. Among the latter is a species that became extinct centuries ago, the Huahine starling (Aplonis diluvialis), whose fossils found on the island date its disappearance some seven centuries ago (although the German naturalist Georg Forster depicted in the 18th century a bird on the island of Raiatea very similar to the animal in question). In 2019, the Partula rosea and Partula varia snails were reintroduced to the island.

In February 2024, the Ornithological Society of Polynesia reintroduced the Tahitian Striated heron to the island.

=== Climate ===
The climate of Huahine similar to that of other islands in the archipelago is classified as a Tropical Rainforest climate (Af) according to the Köppen Climate classification. It remains hot and humid with little temperature variation throughout the year. In the austral winter months of July and August precipitation is slightly lower than during the rest of the year.

Climate data for Huahine (1991–2020 averages, extremes 1959−present)
Month	Jan	Feb	Mar	Apr	May	Jun	Jul	Aug	Sep	Oct	Nov	Dec	Year
Record high °C (°F)	35.0 (95.0)	35.2 (95.4)	35.5 (95.9)	35.5 (95.9)	34.5 (94.1)	33.5 (92.3)	33.5 (92.3)	34.0 (93.2)	33.6 (92.5)	33.1 (91.6)	34.0 (93.2)	35.0 (95.0)	35.5 (95.9)
Mean daily maximum °C (°F)	31.1 (88.0)	31.4 (88.5)	31.7 (89.1)	31.5 (88.7)	30.8 (87.4)	29.9 (85.8)	29.6 (85.3)	29.4 (84.9)	29.7 (85.5)	30.1 (86.2)	30.7 (87.3)	31.0 (87.8)	30.6 (87.1)
Daily mean °C (°F)	27.4 (81.3)	27.5 (81.5)	27.9 (82.2)	27.6 (81.7)	27.0 (80.6)	26.2 (79.2)	25.8 (78.4)	25.7 (78.3)	26.0 (78.8)	26.5 (79.7)	27.0 (80.6)	27.4 (81.3)	26.8 (80.2)
Mean daily minimum °C (°F)	23.7 (74.7)	23.7 (74.7)	24.0 (75.2)	23.7 (74.7)	23.3 (73.9)	22.6 (72.7)	22.1 (71.8)	21.9 (71.4)	22.3 (72.1)	22.9 (73.2)	23.3 (73.9)	23.7 (74.7)	23.1 (73.6)
Record low °C (°F)	17.0 (62.6)	20.0 (68.0)	20.0 (68.0)	16.8 (62.2)	18.5 (65.3)	16.0 (60.8)	14.8 (58.6)	16.5 (61.7)	17.0 (62.6)	18.5 (65.3)	18.5 (65.3)	19.2 (66.6)	14.8 (58.6)
Average precipitation mm (inches)	394.8 (15.54)	287.1 (11.30)	262.5 (10.33)	258.4 (10.17)	246.7 (9.71)	201.9 (7.95)	140.1 (5.52)	148.3 (5.84)	202.8 (7.98)	259.6 (10.22)	260.8 (10.27)	394.0 (15.51)	3,057 (120.35)
Source: Infoclimat

== Administration ==
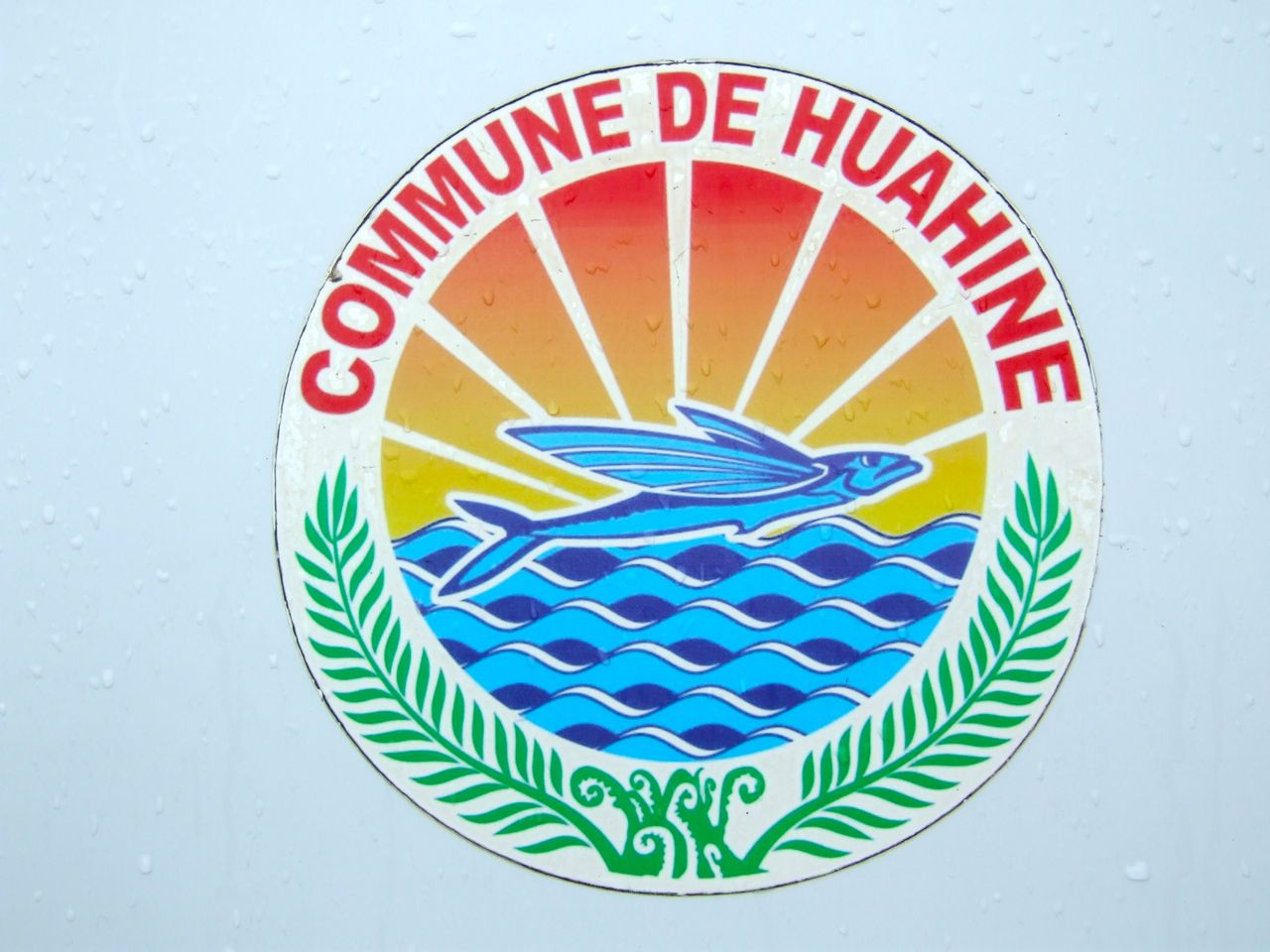
Huahine emblem

Administratively Huahine is a commune (municipality) part of the administrative subdivision of the Leeward Islands. Huahine consists of the following associated communes:

- Faie
- Fare
- Fitii
- Haapu
- Maeva
- Maroe
- Parea
- Tefarerii

The administrative centre of the commune is the settlement of Fare, on Huahine Nui.

== Demographics ==
The total population was 5,999 inhabitants in the 2007 census, increasing to 6,263 in 2022, distributed across eight villages: Fare (the capital), Maeva, Faie, Fitii, Parea, Tefarerii, Haapu, and Maroe.

The main activities are vanilla cultivation, copra production, fishing, and tourism.

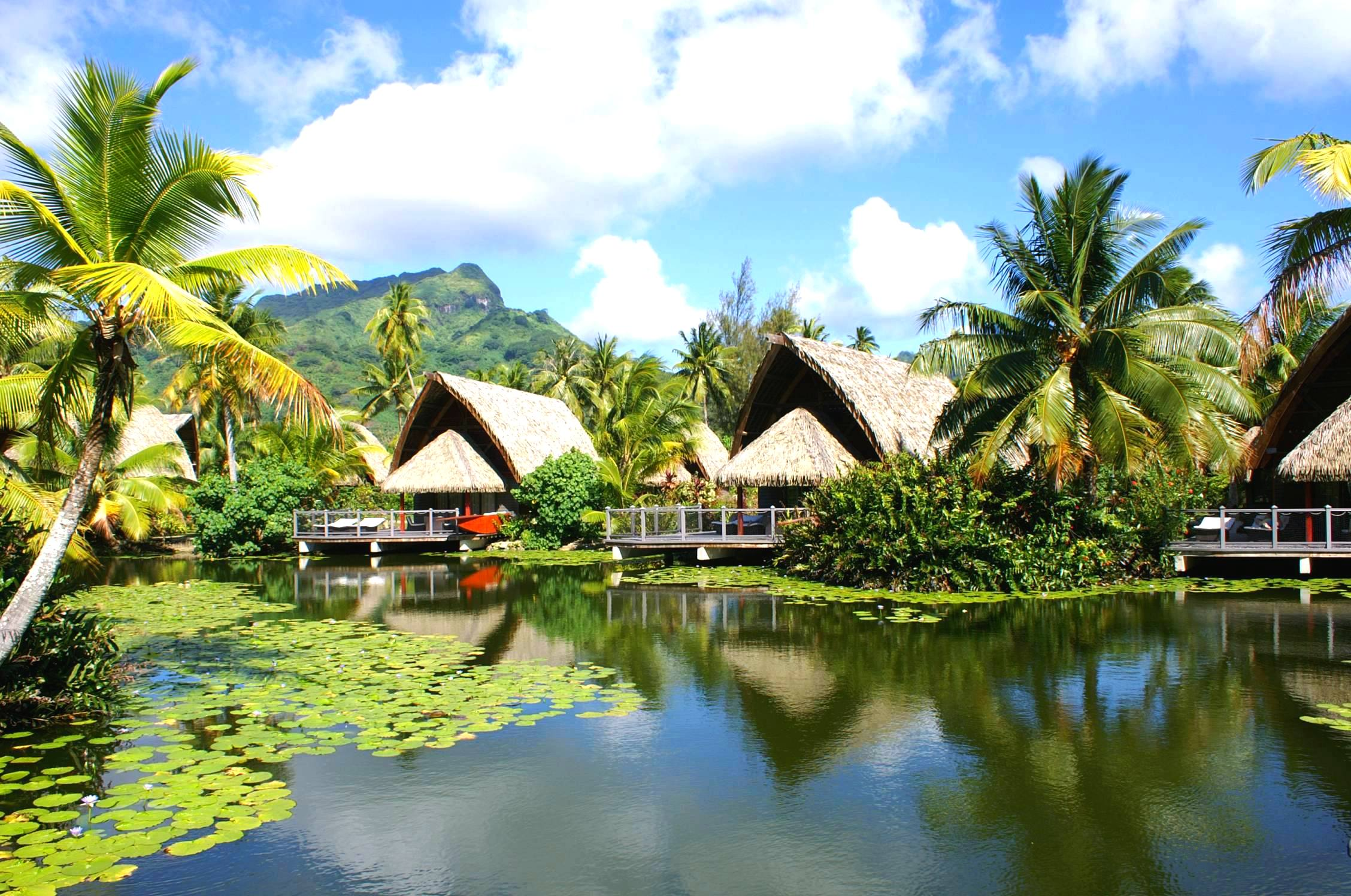
A traditional bungalow on Huahine Island

=== Sport ===
In terms of sports, Huahine is, along with neighboring Bora Bora, Tahaa and Raiatea, one of the four islands among which the Hawaiki Nui Vaʻa, an international Polynesian canoe (vaʻa) competition, is held.

=== Religion ===
Most of the population follows Christianity due to missionary activity by both the Catholic Church and various Protestant groups, as well as European colonization.

In 1809 the island had its first contact with Protestant Christian missionaries. In 1815 the Protestant mission ordered the destruction of the idols of the ancient gods of the local religion. In the following decades, Catholic missionaries arrived. Between 1819 and 1820, the first chapel was built on the island.

The original Catholic church was established between 1906 and 1909. Catholics, under the direction of the Archdiocese of Papeete, administer one religious building, the Church of the Holy Family (Église de la Sainte-Famille) which was reopened in the town of Fare (northwest of the island) on 30 October 2010.

== Economy ==
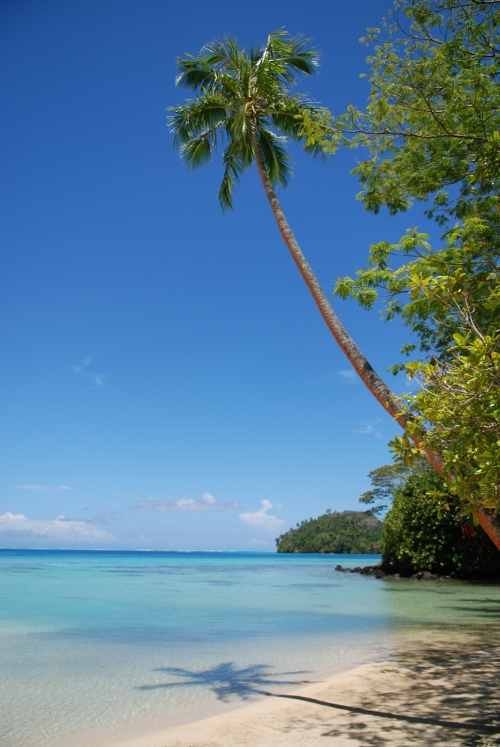
Coconut tree and lagoon, Huahine

The inhabitants of the island are engaged in activities such as agriculture and fishing. Agricultural products include vanilla (Vanilla × tahitensis species) and various types of melons. Thanks to the lush coconut forest, copra production is also a very important activity for the local economy.

=== Tourism ===
Tourism through cruise ship passengers calling at the atoll and the airport is another important economic sector.

One of the famous attractions on Huahine is a bridge that crosses over a stream with 0.9-to-1.8 m (3-to-6 ft) long freshwater eels. These eels are deemed sacred by local mythology. While viewing these slithering creatures, tourists can buy a can of mackerel and feed the eels. The Faʻahia archaeological site in the north of the island has revealed subfossil remains of several species of extinct birds exterminated by the earliest Polynesian colonists of the island.

== Transportation ==
The island has scheduled passenger airline flights operated by Air Tahiti with ATR turboprop aircraft via the Huahine–Fare Airport.

== See also ==
- Dependent Territory
- List of monarchs of Huahine
