= Administrative divisions of French Polynesia =

List of administrative divisions in France

In French Polynesia, there are two levels of administrative divisions: five administrative subdivisions (French: subdivisions administratives) and 48 communes. Many of the communes are further subdivided into communes associées. The breakdown into administrative subdivisions was as a result of the law #71-1028, dated December 24, 1971. The compositions of the administrative subdivisions and the communes were defined in the decrees #72-408 and #72-407 of May 17, 1972, respectively. These subdivisions were confirmed in the decree #2005-1611 of December 20, 2005. Below are several lists of the divisions, according to different sorting schemes.

== List of division level types ==
The 5 administrative subdivisions and 48 communes of French Polynesia.

=== Administrative subdivisions ===
Name	French name	Official French name	Notes	Administrative seat	Area (km^{2})	Population (2017)
Windward Islands	Îles du Vent	la subdivision administrative des îles du Vent	part of the Society Islands	Papeete	1,194.1	207,333
Leeward Islands	Îles Sous-le-Vent	la subdivision administrative des îles Sous-le-Vent	part of the Society Islands	Uturoa	403.5	35,393
Marquesas Islands	Îles Marquises	la subdivision administrative des îles Marquises	a northeastern Polynesian outlier	Nuku-Hiva	1,049.3	9,346
Austral Islands	Îles Australes	la subdivision administrative des îles Australes	includes the Bass Islands	Tubuai	147.8	6,965
Tuamotu-Gambier	Îles Tuamotu-Gambier	la subdivision administrative des îles Tuamotu-Gambier		Papeete	726.5	16,881
French Polynesia				Papeete	3,521.2	275,918

=== Communes ===
Name	Subdivision	INSEE code	Administrative seat	Area (km^{2})	Population (2017)
Fatu-Hiva	Marquesas Islands	98718	Omo'a	85.0	612
Hiva-Oa	Marquesas Islands	98723	Atuona	326.5	2,243
Nuku-Hiva	Marquesas Islands	98731	Taiohae	387.8	2,951
Tahuata	Marquesas Islands	98746	Vaitahu	61.0	653
Ua-Huka	Marquesas Islands	98756	Hane	83.4	674
Ua-Pou	Marquesas Islands	98757	Hakahau	105.6	2,213
Anaa	Îles Tuamotu-Gambier	98711	Tuuhora	55.7	811
Arutua	Îles Tuamotu-Gambier	98713	Rautini	46.0	1,664
Fakarava	Îles Tuamotu-Gambier	98716	Rotoava	110.0	1,637
Fangatau	Îles Tuamotu-Gambier	98717	Teana	14.3	296
Gambier	Îles Tuamotu-Gambier	98719	Rikitea	46.0	1,535
Hao	Îles Tuamotu-Gambier	98720	Otepa	65.0	1,258
Hikueru	Îles Tuamotu-Gambier	98721	Tupapati	15.2	275
Makemo	Îles Tuamotu-Gambier	98726	Pouheva	93.0	1,508
Manihi	Îles Tuamotu-Gambier	98727	Paeua	25.2	1,141
Napuka	Îles Tuamotu-Gambier	98730	Tepuka-Maruia	12.1	284
Nukutavake	Îles Tuamotu-Gambier	98732	Tavava	12.3	295
Puka-Puka	Îles Tuamotu-Gambier	98737	Teone-Mahina	8.0	163
Rangiroa	Îles Tuamotu-Gambier	98740	Tiputa	144.5	3,657
Reao	Îles Tuamotu-Gambier	98742	Rapuarava	18.0	587
Takaroa	Îles Tuamotu-Gambier	98749	Te Havaroa	35.0	1,175
Tatakoto	Îles Tuamotu-Gambier	98751	Tumukuru	7.3	259
Tureia	Îles Tuamotu-Gambier	98755	Hakamaru	19.2	336
Raivavae	Austral Islands	98739	Rairua	20.4	903
Rapa	Austral Islands	98741	Ahurei	40.6	507
Rimatara	Austral Islands	98743	Amaru	9.1	872
Rurutu	Austral Islands	98744	Moerai	32.8	2,466
Tubuai	Austral Islands	98753	Mataura	45.0	2,217
Bora-Bora	Leeward Islands	98714	Vaitape	40.3	10,549
Huahine	Leeward Islands	98724	Fare	74.8	6,075
Maupiti	Leeward Islands	98728	Maupiti	11.4	1,286
Tahaa	Leeward Islands	98745	Patio	90.2	5,234
Taputapuatea	Leeward Islands	98750	Taputapuatea	88.5	4,792
Tumaraa	Leeward Islands	98754	Tumaraa	63.2	3,721
Uturoa	Leeward Islands	98758	Uturoa	35.1	3,736
Arue	Windward Islands	98712	Arue	20.5	10,243
Faʻaʻā	Windward Islands	98715	Faʻaʻā	34.2	29,506
Hitiaa O Te Ra	Windward Islands	98722	Tiarei	218.2	10,033
Mahina	Windward Islands	98725	Mahina	51.6	14,763
Moorea-Maiao	Windward Islands	98729	Afareaitu	141.8	17,816
Paea	Windward Islands	98733	Paea	64.5	13,021
Papara	Windward Islands	98734	Papara	92.5	11,680
Papeete	Windward Islands	98735	Papeete	17.4	26,926
Pīraʻe	Windward Islands	98736	Pirae	35.4	14,209
Punaʻauia	Windward Islands	98738	Punaauia	75.9	28,103
Taiarapu-Est	Windward Islands	98747	Afaahiti	218.3	12,701
Taiarapu-Ouest	Windward Islands	98748	Vairao	104.3	8,078
Teva I Uta	Windward Islands	98752	Mataiea	119.5	10,254
French Polynesia			Papeete	3521.2	275,918

==== Notes ====
For French administrative convenience, Clipperton Island had been attached to French Polynesia until 20 February 2007, but never formed part of any administrative subdivision or commune of French Polynesia. On 21 February 2007, Clipperton Island was transferred from the High Commissioner of the republic in French Polynesia to the Minister of Overseas France.

Tahiti is one of the Windward Islands and is the largest island in French Polynesia. It comprises 12 communes: Arue, Faʻaʻā, Hitiaʻa O Te Ra, Mahina, Paea, Papeete, Papara, Pirae, Punaauia, Taiarapu-Est, Taiarapu-Ouest, and Teva I Uta.

Raʻiātea is one of the Leeward islands and is second largest of the Society Islands. It comprises three communes: Uturoa, Taputapuatea, and Tumaraa.

Huahine: Divided into communes for Huahine Nui and Huahine Iti.

==== Area statistics ====
The communes of French Polynesia have the following statistical info: The average size of French Polynesian communes is 78.06 km^{2}, while the median area is 55.4 km^{2}, higher than the average and median areas of metropolitan French communes (14.88 km^{2} and 10.73 km^{2}, respectively), but the size of these communes is predominantly dependent on the land area of the islands they occupy.

==== Population statistics ====
The communes of French Polynesia have the following statistical info: The average commune population is 5,725, while the median is 2,268, much higher than the average and median metropolitan French commune (1,542 and 380, respectively).

Sources :

- https://web.archive.org/web/20060424072420/http://www.polynesie-francaise.gouv.fr/
- Schmiff, Robert C. (Feb 1962). "Urbanization in French Polynesia". Land Economics. 1. 38: 71–75. doi:10.2307/3144728. JSTOR 3144728.

== See also ==
- Administrative divisions of France
- Lists of communes of France
- French Polynesia

== Sources ==
- official government website archived
