= Associated communes of France =

In France, associated communes (French: communes associées, pronounced [kɔmyn asɔsje]) were created by the Commune Merger Act of 16 July 1971 (also called the Marcellin Act). It permits the formerly independent communes to maintain certain institutions, such as

- a delegate mayor, a registrar, a criminal investigation officer
- a mayor's office
- a community center

On 1 January 2006 there were 730 communes associées in France. Most of those were created within four years after the Marcellin Act was passed.
