= Tamaeva =

Tamaeva may refer to:

- Tamaeva IV (died 1892), Queen of Rimatara from 1876 to 1892
- Tamaeva V (c. 1830–1923), Queen of Rimatara from 1892 to 1901
