= Tamaeva V =

- Queen of Rimatara
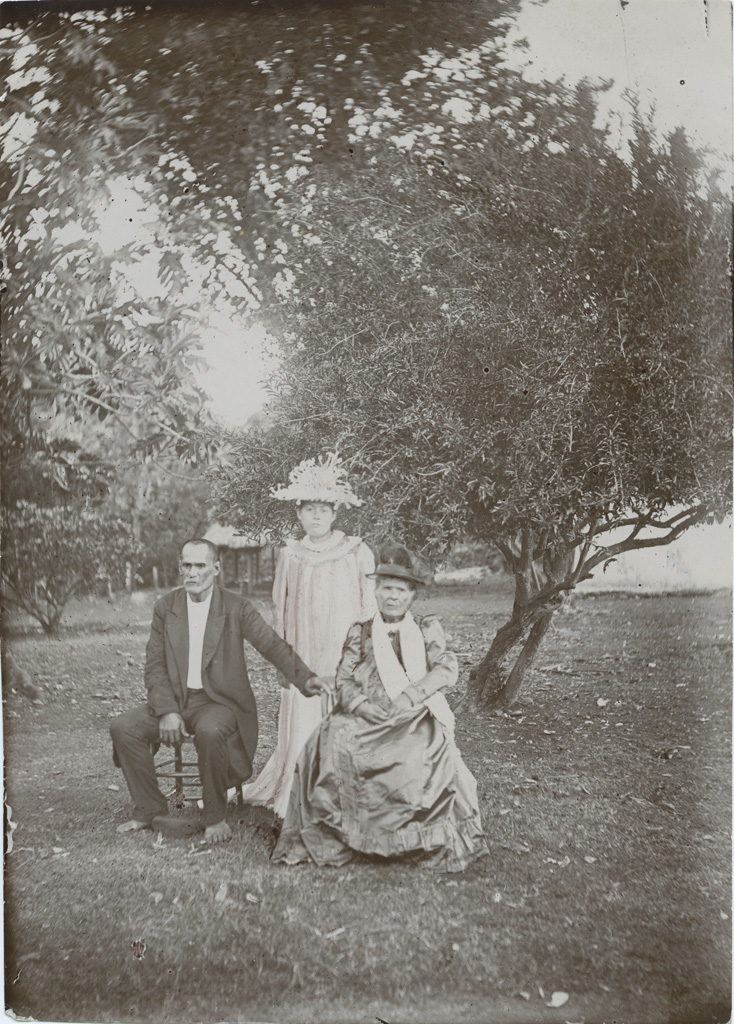
- Queen Tamaeva V (far right), 1905
- Reign: 1892–1901
- Predecessor: Tamaeva IV
- Born: c. 1830
- Died: 1923
- Burial: Royal Sepulchre, Amaru Cemetery
- Father: Tamaeva II

Tamaeva V or Temaeva V, (Note: French sources refer to her as Temaeva while her tombstone in Rimatara gives her name as Tamaeva.) formally Heimataura Tamatoa Tamaeva V (c. 1830 – 1923), was the Arii vahine no Rimatara or queen of the island kingdom of Rimatara, an island within the larger Austral Islands archipelago, from 1892 to 1901. She served as regent for her predecessor Queen Tamaeva IV.

Tamaeva V's reign was disrupted by ongoing French expansionism in the Pacific. She and her predecessor Tamaeva IV had previously attempted in vain to request a British protectorate to hold off French colonial pressure. This action resulted in the declaration of a French protectorate over Rimatara on 29 March 1889. In 1900, the neighboring kingdom of Rurutu was annexed to bring it economically closer to French controlled Tahiti. As the last monarch in the Austral Island group, Tamaeva V ceded Rimatara to the French on 6 June 1901 and the island was formally annexed on 2 September 1901 and incorporated into the territory of French Oceania, today part of the overseas country of French Polynesia.

Tamaeva V was responsible for saving the Rimatara lorikeet (Vini kuhlii) from extinction during the early 20th century. The species was threaten by overhunting and the introduction of black rat. In 1900, she declared a tapu or taboo which forbade any Rimataran from exporting, exploiting, or harming the bird. Surviving population of the birds were reintroduced to Atiu in the Cook Islands in 2007. Tamaeva V died in 1923 and her remains were interred in the Royal Sepulchre at the Cemetery of Amaru.

== Early life ==
Born on the Polynesian island of Rimatara, Heimataura was the daughter of King Tamaeva II, Ari'i of Rimatara. She lived in a world influenced by the changes brought on by the westernization of the island. Rimatara had been the last of the Austral Islands to be discovered by Western explorers in 1811. Protestantism was introduced by Tahitian missionaries from the Society Islands and became the dominant religion on the island. A church at the capital of Amaru, constructed in 1857 and renovated in 1892, housed the entire island's population of 300 people under its roof. The small kingdom had fashioned its own sovereign flag by 1856. The first law code was introduced in 1877.

== Rule as regent ==
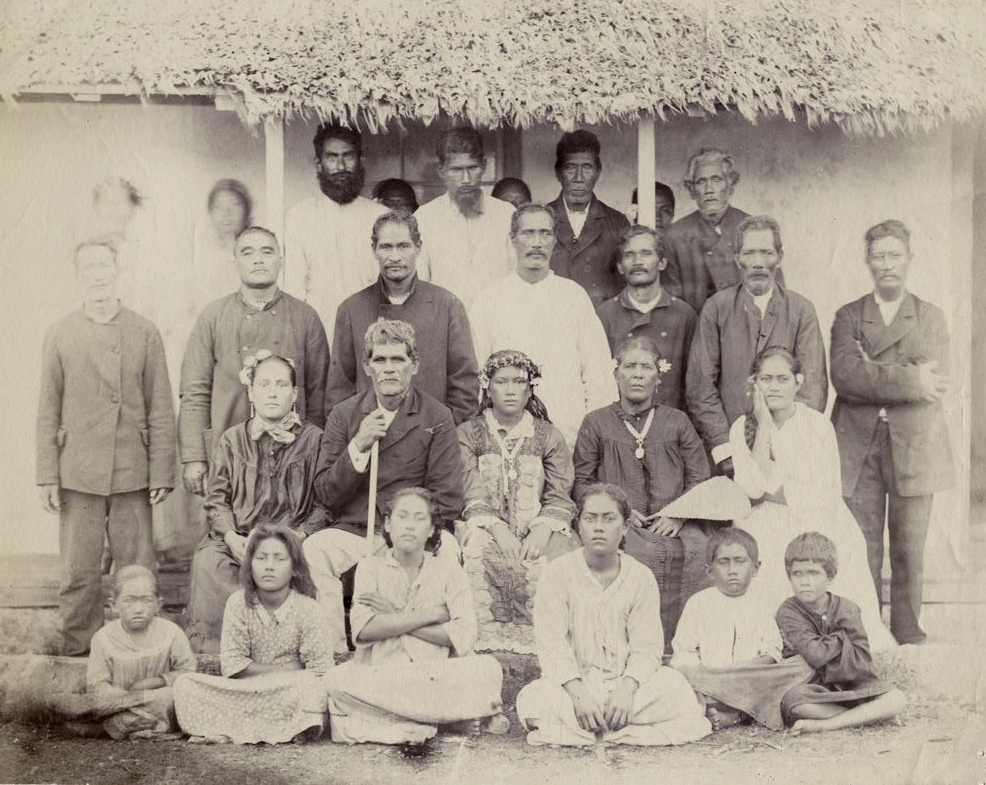
The young queen Tamaeva IV, the regent, group of chiefs and inhabitants of Rimatara, c. 1889

Rimatara and its neighbor Rurutu were unique because they remained independent while the other Austral Islands, and even Tahiti to the north, fell to the French colonial empire. Tamaeva II died in 1865. It is assumed that a brother or a male relative of Heimataura succeeded to the throne as Tamaeva III. Tamatoa III was later succeeded by his daughter Queen Tamaeva IV. Heimataura served as regent for the teenage Tamaeva IV. In 1892, French Protestant missionary Frédéric Vernier, of the Paris Evangelical Missionary Society, visited Rimatara at the invitation of the adolescent queen and queen regent. During his stay, Vernier witnessed the restoration and reopening of the church in the capital, Amaru, which was celebrated with much fanfare.

Rimatara and Rurutu attempted in vain to request a British protectorate to hold off French colonial aggression. The French responded immediately to what they presumed to be a threat to their interests in the Pacific. On 29 March 1889, the French warship Dives landed on Rimatara with the colonial governor of French Oceania, Étienne Théodore Lacascade, on board, and he had Rimatara and its dependency Îles Maria declared a French protectorate. The French sources state that the queen, regent and chiefs had personally petitioned Governor Lacascade to take over the islands, but British sources believed the whole affair to be largely contrary to the desire of the majority of the islanders. The protectorate treaty was signed by Lascarde and five French officials and countersigned by the queen, Heimataura, and seven other chiefs or councilors. As a sign of the newly declared protectorate, the French tricolor was added to the canton of the kingdom's flag in 1891.

== Reign ==
After the early death of Tamaeva IV on 12 November 1892, Heimataura succeeded as Queen of Rimatara in her own right as Tamaeva V. Under the French protectorate she was allowed to reign with much of the intact native government and laws of the past.

In 1900, the neighboring King Teuruarii IV of Rurutu had his kingdom formally annexed to France in order to bring it closer economically to the colonial seat of Papeete. Tamaeva, the last independent monarch in the Austral Islands, ceded Rimatara to France the following year, in a declaration dated to 6 June 1901. On 2 September 1901, Rimatara was formally annexed to France in a ceremony officiated by Governor Édouard Georges Théophile Petit. The Queen was represented by her three children: Narii, Tairiata, and Tamatoa. At the end of the transfer, the flag of the protectorate was replaced by the French tricolor with cries of "Vive la République Française" from the populace. The island was incorporated into the territory of French Oceania, today part of the overseas country of French Polynesia.

Tamaeva V died in 1923. Her remains were interred in the Royal Sepulchre at the Cemetery of Amaru, outside the settlement facing the sea; she was laid to rest beside other members of the Tamaeva royal line.

== Saving the Rimatara lorikeet ==
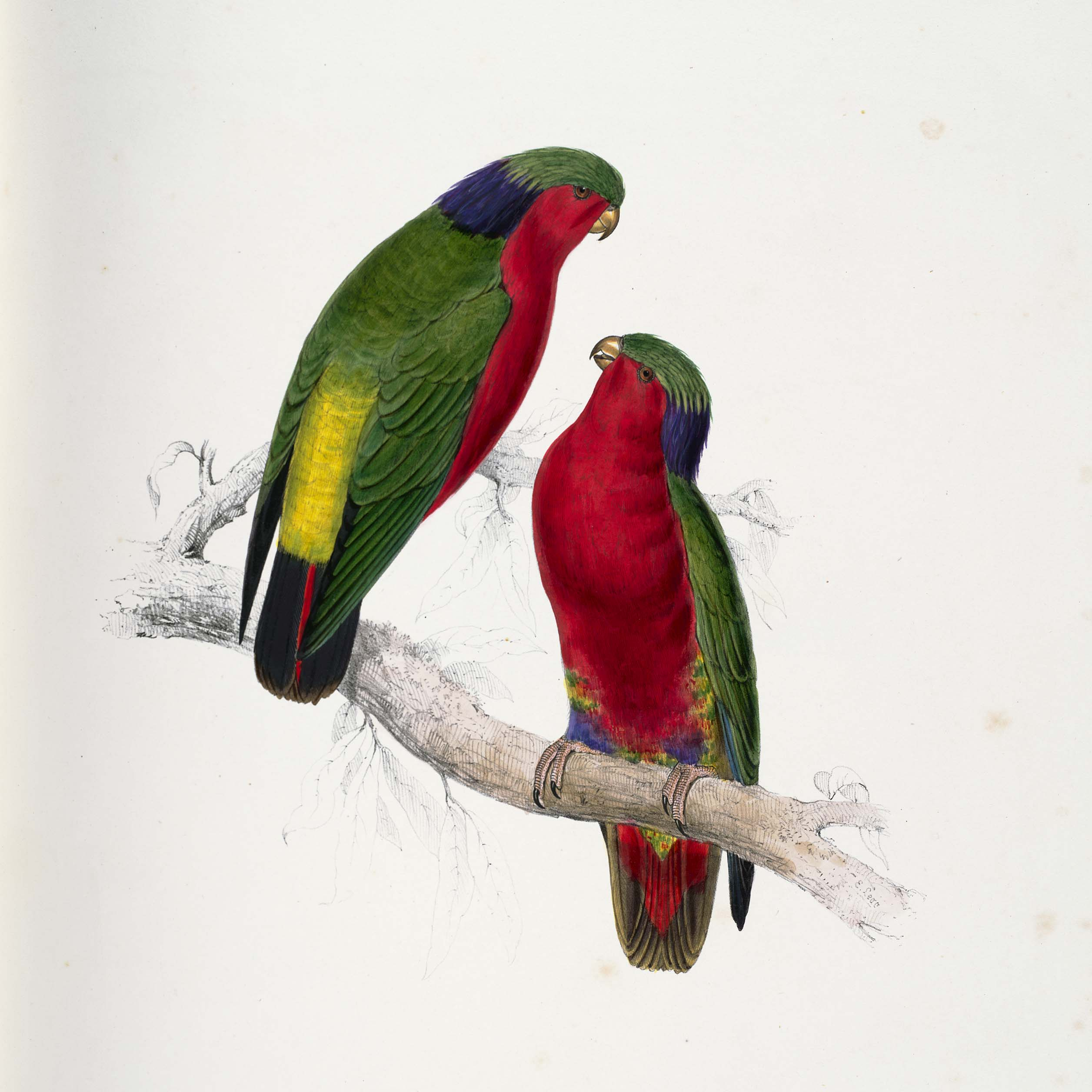
The Rimatara lorikeet or Kuhl's lorikeet. Lithograph by Edward Lear

According to local tradition, the Rimatara lorikeet (Vini kuhlii; also known as the 'Ura or Kuhl's lorikeet) was saved from extinction by a royal declaration issued by Queen Tamaeva V in 1900. The species was endemic to the southern Cook Islands and Rimatara but had been decimated in the former group after the introduction of the black rat and overhunting by local people. She declared a tapu or taboo which forbade any Rimataran from exporting, exploiting, or harming the bird.

In 2007, a population was reintroduced to the black-rat-free island of Atiu in the Cook Islands by BirdLife International, the Cook Islands Natural Heritage Trust and numerous conservation bodies, including the San Diego Zoo Institute for Conservation Research. In 2008, the introduced population was found to be reproducing.
