= Avera =

Avera may refer to:

- Avera, Georgia, a city in Georgia, United States
- Avera, Mississippi, an unincorporated community in Mississippi, United States
- Avera, Raiatea, a village on the island of Raiatea, French Polynesia
- Avera, Rurutu, a village on the island of Rurutu, French Polynesia
- Avera Health, a health care system in the US Midwest
- Avera, a diminutive of the Russian male first name Averky
- Avera Motors, now Rivian, makers of electric automobiles

== See also ==
- Avera and inward, feudal duties in England
- Aveira or averah, a Hebrew word for transgression or sin
