= Tamaeva IV =

- Queen of Rimatara
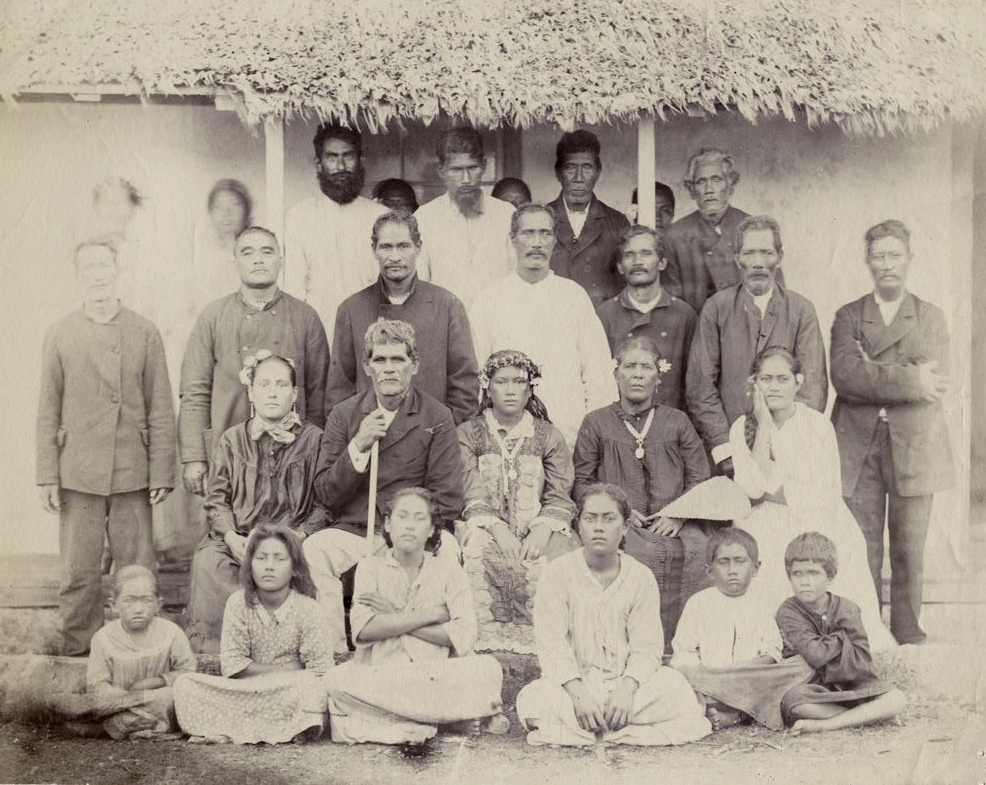
- The young queen, the regent, group of chiefs and inhabitants of Rimatara, c. 1889
- Reign: 1876–1892
- Predecessor: Tamaeva III
- Successor: Tamaeva V
- Born: c. 1870s
- Died: 12 November 1892
- Burial: Royal Sepulchre, Amaru Cemetery
- Father: Tamaeva III
- Religion: Protestantism

Tamaeva IV (died 1892) was the reigning queen of the Polynesian island of Rimatara who ruled from 1876 until her death in 1892. French sources refer to her as Temaeva, and one Australian newspaper called her Te Maere, while her tombstone in Rimatara gives her name as Tamaeva.

== Biography ==
Her father was King Tamaeva III of Rimatara, an island kingdom which also controlled the neighboring coral atoll of Nororotu (or Îles Maria), a claim it disputes with the neighboring kingdom of Rurutu. She was born during the period of westernization of the island and the Christian conversion of the islanders to the Protestant faith. Sources differ on her actual age and her date of birth, although it is certain that Tamaeva was only a teenager at the time of her death, which would place her birth in the early 1870s. Because of her youth and inexperience, her aunt Heimataura served as regent.

She had a close relationship with the neighboring island of Rurutu, which was also ruled by an adolescent monarch, King Teuruarii IV. They would also share the same positions as the last independent rulers in the Austral Islands outside the sphere of French colonial control. Hearing reports that the neighboring Cook Islands had been declared a protectorate of the British, a nation considered more friendly than the French due to the islands' adherence to the Protestant faith, the queen decided to ally herself with Great Britain. On 27 November 1888, the monarchs of both islands visited Rarotonga to ask for British protection against further French aggression. They sent a formal petition to Queen Victoria seeking protectorate status for the two kingdoms. The request was ultimately refused.

The efforts of the two were in vain because the French responded immediately to what they presumed to be a threat to their interests in the Pacific. On 29 March 1889, the French warship Dives landed on Rimatara with the colonial governor of French Oceania, Étienne Théodore Lacascade, on board, and he had Rimatara and Îles Maria declared a French protectorate. The French version of the story was that the Queen and chiefs had personally petitioned Governor Lacascade to take over the islands, but British sources believed the whole affair to be largely contrary to the desire of the majority of the islanders. As a sign of the newly declared protectorate, the French tricolor was added to the canton of the kingdom's flag in 1891.

In 1892, French Protestant missionary Frédéric Vernier of the Paris Evangelical Missionary Society described Queen Tamaeva as "a girl of sixteen or seventeen years". During his stay, he witnessed the restoration and reopening of the church in the capital, Amaru, which was celebrated with much fanfare.

She died on 12 November 1892 and was succeeded by her aunt who reigned as Tamaeva V. Her remains were interred in the Royal Sepulchre at the Cemetery of Amaru, outside the settlement facing the sea; she was laid to rest beside other members of the Tamaeva royal line.
