= Moerai =

- Associated commune of Rurutu
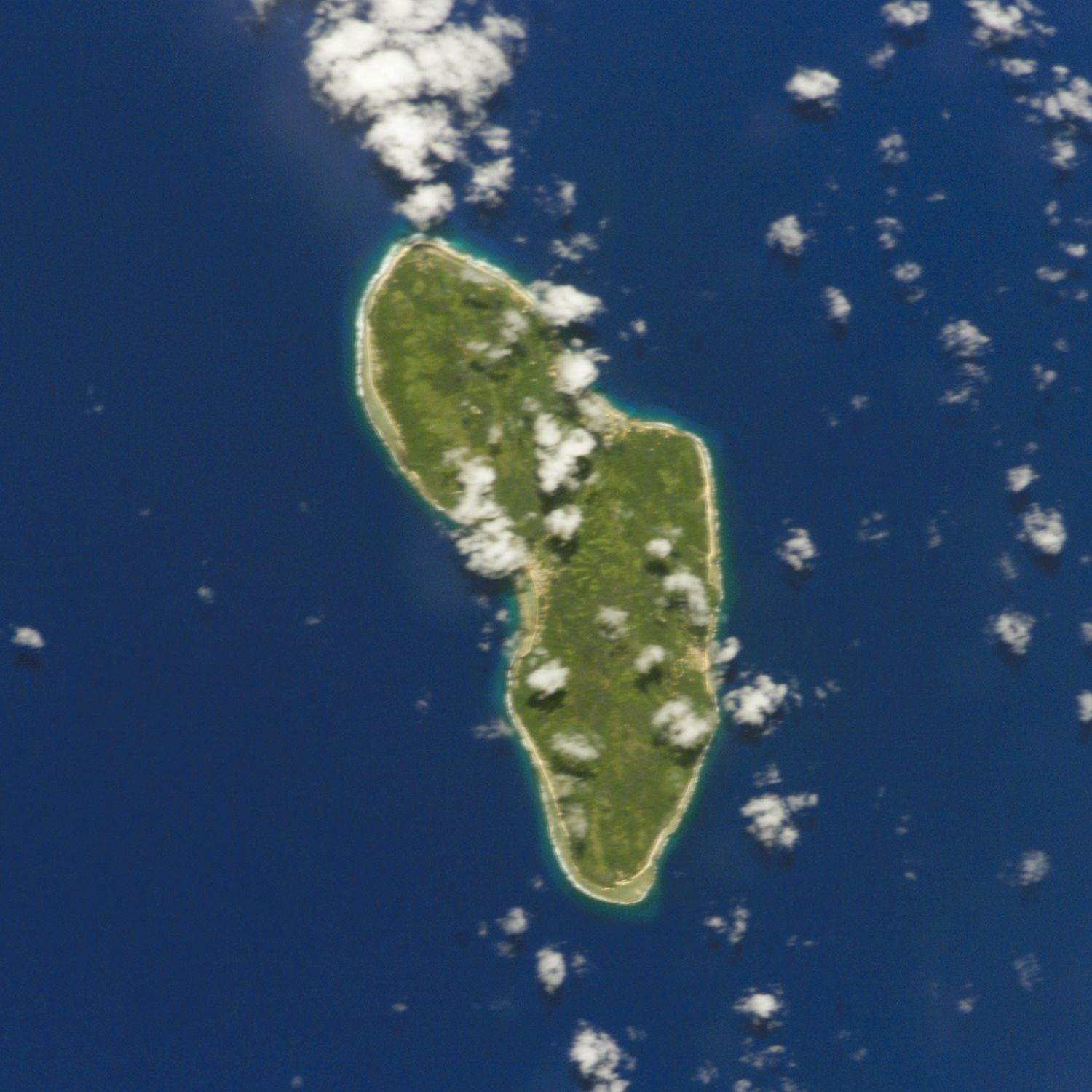
- Rurutu, the island on which Moerai is located

- Location within French Polynesia
- Location of Moerai
- Coordinates: 22°27′5″S 151°20′32″W
- Country: France
- Overseas collectivity: French Polynesia
- Subdivision: Austral Islands
- Commune: Rurutu
- Elevation: 13 m (43 ft)
- Population (2022): 987
- Time zone: UTC−10:00

Moerai is a village on the island of Rurutu, in French Polynesia. According to the 2022 census, it had a population of 987.
