= Mutuaura =

- Associated commune of Rimatara
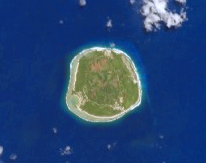
- Rimatara, the island on which Mutuaura is located

- Location within French Polynesia
- Location of Mutuaura
- Coordinates: 22°39′35″S 152°48′19″W
- Country: France
- Overseas collectivity: French Polynesia
- Subdivision: Austral Islands
- Commune: Rimatara
- Elevation: 14 m (46 ft)
- Population (2022): 341
- Time zone: UTC−10:00

Mutuaura is a commune on the island of Rimatara, in French Polynesia. According to the 2022 census, it had a population of 341 people. It is in the Tahiti Time (TAHT) time zone.
