= Hauti =

- Associated commune of Rurutu
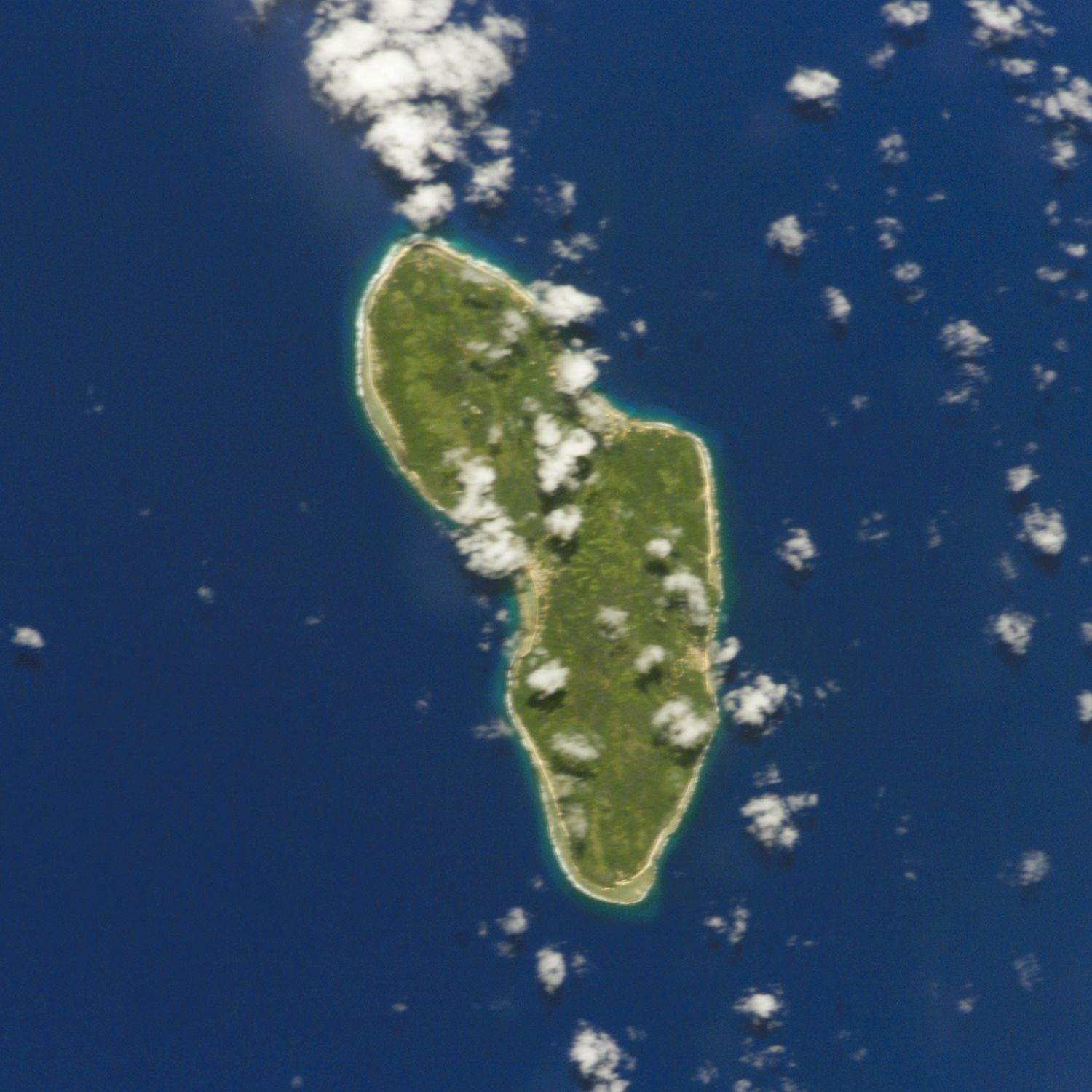
- Rurutu, the island on which Hauti is located

- Location within French Polynesia
- Location of Hauti
- Coordinates: 22°29′14″S 151°19′31″W
- Country: France
- Overseas collectivity: French Polynesia
- Subdivision: Austral Islands
- Commune: Rurutu
- Elevation: 7 m (23 ft)
- Population (2022): 406
- Time zone: UTC−10:00

Hauti is a commune on the island of Rurutu, in French Polynesia. According to the 2022 census, it had a population of 406.
