= Amaru, Rimatara =

Amaru
- Associated commune of Rimatara
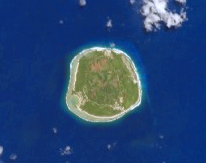
- Rimatara, the island on which Amaru is located

- Location within French Polynesia
- Location of Amaru
- Coordinates: 22°38′48″S 152°47′32″W
- Country: France
- Overseas collectivity: French Polynesia
- Subdivision: Austral Islands
- Commune: Rimatara
- Population (2022): 274
- Time zone: UTC−10:00

Amaru is a village on the island of Rimatara, in French Polynesia. According to the 2022 census, it had a population of 274 people. It is the capital of Rimatara.
