= Teuruarii IV =

- King of Rurutu
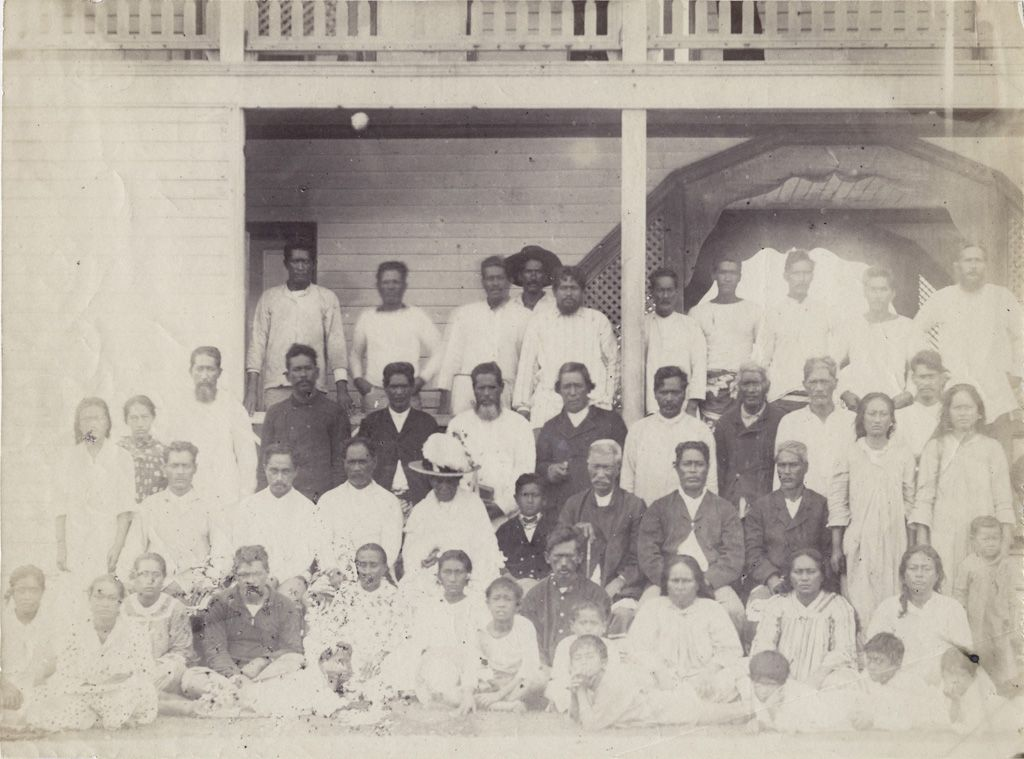
- The young king, the regent, group of chiefs and inhabitants of Rurutu, c. 1889
- Reign: c. 1886 – 25 August 1900
- Predecessor: Teuruarii III
- Born: 8 August 1879
- Died: 1933 or 1936
- Issue: Rooteatauira a Teuruarii
Names
- Epatiana Teuruarii IV
- Father: Paa Teuruarii III
- Mother: Taarouru a Mootua
- Religion: Protestantism

Teuruarii IV, born Epatiana a Teuruarii (8 August 1879 – c. 1933/1936), was the last King of Rurutu, an island within the larger Austral Islands archipelago, who ruled from around 1886 until the annexation of the island to France in 1900. Proclaimed king upon his father's abdication while still a child, his mother ruled as regent. During this regency the Church of Moerari was consecrated and the death penalty was abolished.

Teuruarii's reign was disrupted by ongoing French expansionism in the Pacific. Teuruarii entreated the British to place Rurutu under a British protectorate, which the islanders deemed more favorable due to their predominant adherence to Protestantism. These efforts failed and Rurutu was proclaimed a protectorate of the French Third Republic on 27 March 1889. Teuruarii was allowed to continue ruling as king until the annexation of the island to the territory of French Oceania in 1900, today part of the overseas country of French Polynesia. Living out the remainder of his life as a village chief, Teuruarii left many descendants who would have a strong influence in the islands to the modern day.

== Family and early life ==
King Teuruarii IV was born Prince Epatiana in around 1879 on the island of Rurutu, in present-day French Polynesia, to King Teuruarii III and his second wife Taarouru a Mootua. His family was originally from a chiefly line in Huahine rather than Rurutu, and it was only through the adoption of his father by King Teuruarii I that his family was eligible to rule. The island of Rurutu was settled later than many of the surrounding islands and was historically ruled as an unoccupied territory by the earliest kings of the archipelago. Including these early kings, the royal line of Epatiana stretched back more than forty generations and included many of the founding chiefs of the Austral Islands kingdoms, as well as early kings of Rurutu after the settlement of the island. Little is recorded of the prince's childhood, although it is known that Epatiana and his parents were visited by the French writer and later governor of French Polynesia, Édouard Petit, in the early 1880s, when the young prince Epatiana was still nursing from his mother.

His full-siblings were Amaiterai, Tautiare, Mearoha and Tautiti. His older half-sister Tetuamarama, daughter of his father's first wife Temataurarii a Tavita, was married into the royal family of Huahine and was the mother of that island's last queen, Tehaapapa III.

== Reign ==
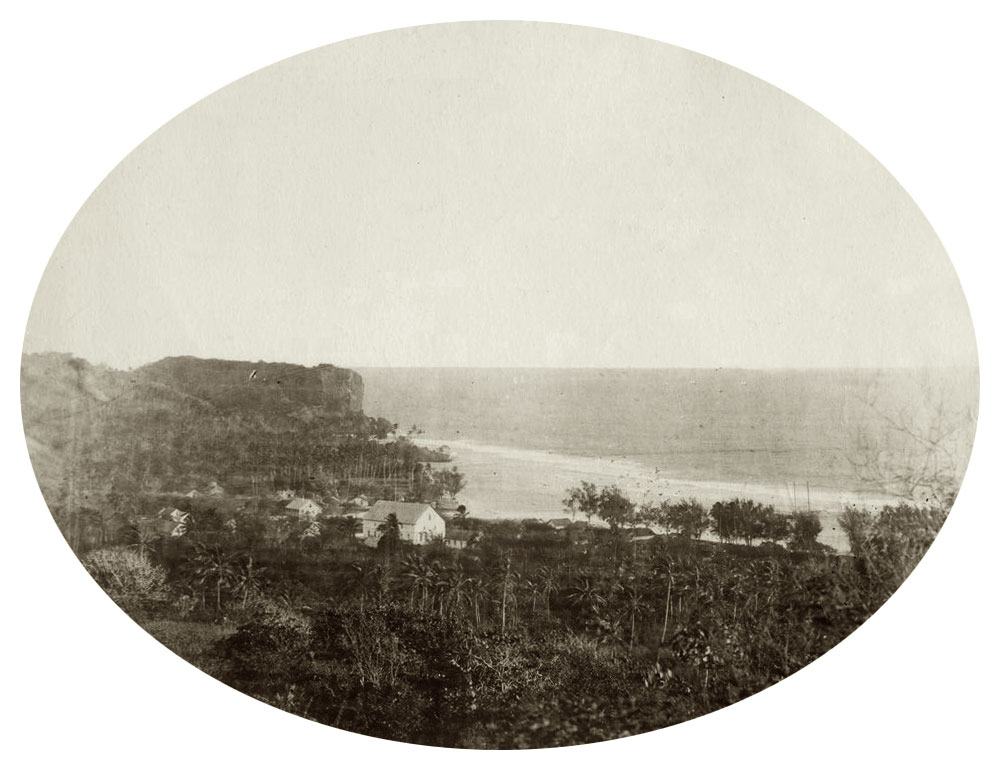
The village of Moerai, 27 March 1889

Epatiana succeeded his father as King of Rurutu around 1886, while still a young child. Due to historians' lack of consensus about his birth year, sources differ on the actual age of Epatiana at the time. This early succession was a consequence of a decision taken in old age by Epatiana's father to abdicate and journey back to his homeland of Huahine, where he died shortly after arrival. The body of Teuruarii III was repatriated to Rurutu and interred in the royal cemetery. Because of Epatiana's youth and inexperience, his mother Taarouru served as regent for an indeterminate number of years until the prince was deemed fit to rule independently.

The young King Teuruarii's coronation was celebrated in the traditional fashion. The ceremony included donning a feather headdress and the maro'ura, a sacred loincloth of red-tinted tapa cloth similar to the ones worn by the chiefs in the Society Islands, before being carried on the backs of two natives.

During the regency, he and his mother abolished the Va'a Tai 'Aru, the law, enacted by his father, which had made crimes such as murder, treason and adultery punishable by death. Instead, criminals were exiled to small island of Îles Maria. Teuruarii and his mother also presided over the opening of the Protestant church of Moerai. The construction of the church had been begun by his father and the work was completed by a foreign carpenter named Quittaine Chapman.

In the late 19th-century, Rurutu shared a close relationship with the neighboring island of Rimatara, which was also ruled by an adolescent monarch, in the person of Queen Tamaeva IV. The monarchs of both island kingdoms shared the same positions as being the last independent rulers in the Austral Islands not under French colonial control.

=== Under French protectorate ===
Flag of the French Protectorate of Rurutu (1889–1900)

Teuruarii's reign coincided with continuing expansion of European authority in the Pacific islands. By 1880, France had formally annexed the Kingdom of Tahiti and its dependencies in the Austral Islands, including Raivavae and Tubuai, Rurutu's neighbors to the south. The following year, Rapa Iti and Marotiri, further south, were also annexed to France, such that among the islands of the Austral archipelago, only Rurutu and Rimatara remained independent of French control. Teuruarii anticipated eventual European interests in Rurutu, but viewed the United Kingdom as a friendlier state than France due to the island's adherence to Protestantism. Upon hearing news that the neighboring Cook Islands had been declared a protectorate of the United Kingdom, the King decided to ally himself with Great Britain.

On 27 November 1888, Teuruarii and Tameava, along with their retinue of chiefs, visited the neighboring island kingdom of Rarotonga aboard two ships named the Faaito and the Ronui, to ask for British protection against French aggression. They sent a formal petition to Queen Victoria and the Prime Minister asking for protectorate status over the two kingdoms. The request was ultimately refused. The petition read:

November 27, 1888: Petition from the King of Rurutu and the Queen of Rimatara and their nobles to Her Most Gracious Majesty Queen Victoria, and to the Prime Minister of the United Kingdom. May you have good health. We, Teuruarii, King of Rurutu and Te Maere, Queen of Rimatara and our nobles, ask for the Prime Minister to place our islands and our ships under the protection of the British flag. These are the islands, namely, Rurutu, Rimatara, and Marià, and there are the names of the ships: Faaito and Ronui, and the masters of the same are natives. This is our word to you: Do not forsake us; we are your children; you taught us the word of God, and that has led us in the path of civilisation; therefore we know that you are a good parent to us. The thoughts of the children cling fondly to their good parent; they do not wish to be separated from their good parent. If the parent forsake the children, the children will seek the parent; so do we; we are like those children, and we ask that you will give us your flag to protect us. We have heard that you have taken Rarotonga and the neighbouring islands under your protection, but we remain without anyone to protect us. When we received the news that Rarotonga and the neighbouring islands were placed under your protection, we wept aloud because we were forsaken by you; we were afraid lest we should be adopted by another parent. The strange parent we mean is the French. They did not feed us with the milk of the gospel, but you did. O Great Britain; you fed us with that milk which has given life to us. This is our last word to you; we do not wish for French annexation or protection, not at all, but we wish you to be our parent, O Great Britain. We pray you now to accede to this our request. This letter was written in the house of Queen Pa. -TEURUARII, TE MAERE ARII.

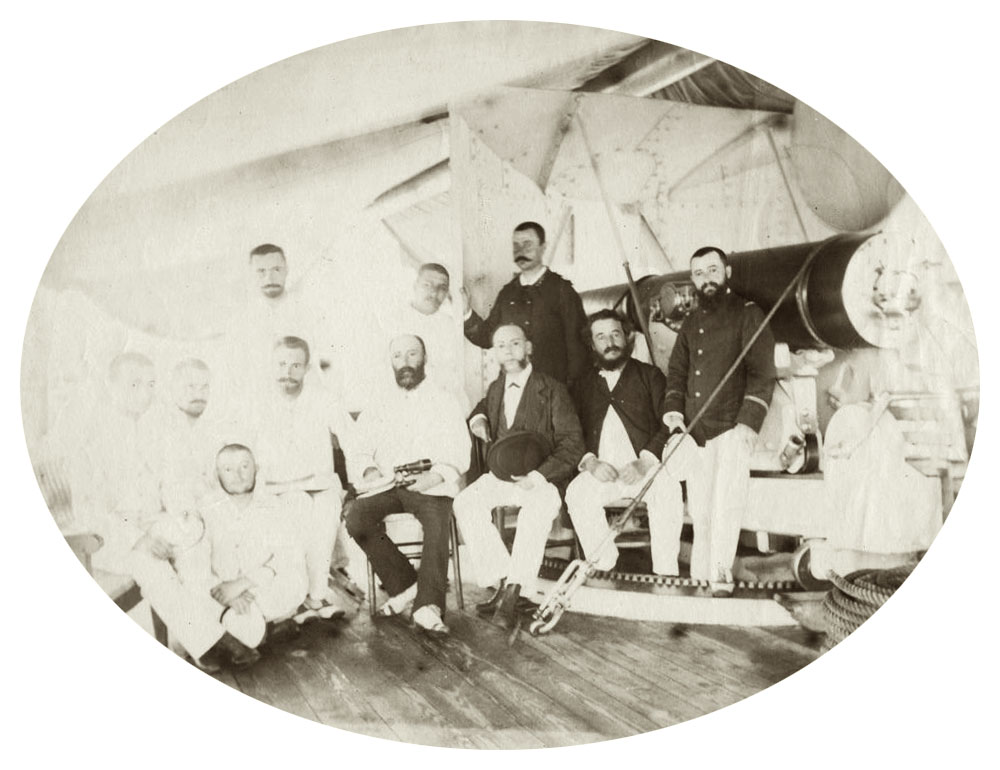
Governor Lacascade aboard the Dives, 30 March 1889

The efforts of the two monarchs could not yield the desired result because the French, upon learning of their request, responded promptly to what they perceived as a threat to their interests in the Pacific. On 27 March 1889, the French warship Dives landed on Rurutu carrying the colonial governor of French Oceania, Étienne Lacascade. British and French sources provide differing accounts of Teuruarii's response to Lacascade's arrival. According to the British, the King was initially reluctant to agree to a French protectorate but ultimately decided to give his acquiescence. According to the French, however, King Teuruarii and his chiefs had personally petitioned Governor Lacascade to take over the islands, largely contrary to the desire of the majority of the islanders. The French tricolor was added to the canton of the Kingdom's flag to indicate its new status as a French protectorate. A 21-gun salute from the Dives, followed by the proclamation "Vive la France! Vive Rurutu!", brought the island under French control.

Under the French protectorate, the internal affairs of the Kingdom were left to the King and chiefs including the judicial affairs of the island. Around 1895, Mormon Elder Frank Goff visited Rurutu, noting the political situation at the time and giving a rather unflattering description of the young king:

The island is ruled over by a king. His name is Epatiana. He is a large, ignorant-looking boy of about 18 summers, and is one of the worst rowdies on the island, and there is no power to touch him. The first time we met him he was just landing from an excursion trip to the island of Rimatara, near by. And you need not be told that I was surprised when told that he was the king of the island; for instead of being dressed in a garb of rich apparel of some kind, with a crown about his head, as I had expected, he had nothing whatever on to indicate his supreme power. His costume was composed of a red breech-clout, a red woolen shirt and upon his bare head an old dried up wreath of faded flowers, such as is worn by all rowdies. When we spoke to him about his island, he dropped his head, as he sat upon the sand, and blushingly answered us. We told him who we were and where we were from, saluted him and left him with very different ideas formed about the king of Rurutu, than we had before meeting him. This was the first monarch of the kind I ever saw, and the first time we were ever under the reign of a king. The island is under the French protection, still it regulates and governs its own affairs, and the French have nothing to say in that respect. The king has judges under him, who make the laws and enforce them while he is in his childhood days.

By contrast, French observers remarked favorably on the industriousness and intelligence of the people of Rurutu, as well as the success of Teuruarii in increasing revenues through maritime trade with neighboring islands. In 1899, Rurutu's annual exports were valued at 59,881 French francs, of which 37,919 were exported to the Tahitian port of Papeete - exceptionally high trade volumes in light of the relatively small size of the island and its population.

== Annexation and later life ==
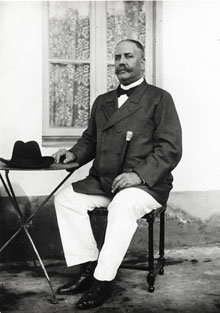
Governor Gustave Gallet, who helped bring about the annexation of Rurutu

The protectorate status had a negative effect on the island's trade with Tahiti. Ships from Rurutu, as from other protectorates, were considered foreign vessels at the ports of France and its overseas territories such as the Tahitian port capital of Papeete, Rurutu's nearest significant trading partner. Consequently, Rurutu's agricultural exports were subject to tariffs from which the exports of annexed territories were exempted. The economic disadvantages of the protectorate status became even more evident when France closed the Tahitian ports to all foreigners in 1899, including merchants from Rurutu, in response to an outbreak of bubonic plague in San Francisco. This disruption of trade between the two islands occurred in a period during which Rurutu became increasingly reliant economically on Tahiti. The growing prominence of Tahiti was evidenced in the activities of Teuruarii, who regularly visited Papeete for trade and entertainment. Teuruarii incurred much debt during these trips, and the need to pay off his creditors along with the restriction on trade prompted him to consider formal annexation to France.

In May 1900, Teuruarii journeyed with a few island dignitaries to Papeete on the invitation of Gustave Gallet, the French governor, to discuss the possibility of annexing the island. On 11 May, Teuruarii signed a statement of annexation, officially bringing Rurutu under French control. Months later, the L'Aube brought Gallet to Rurutu, where he officially took possession of the island. On 25 August, in a formal ceremony witnessed by Governor Gallet, the officers of the L'Aube, the French officials aboard, the former king and the native population, the flag of the protectorate was lowered and the French tricolor raised in its place; this moment, like the ceremony of 1888, was celebrated by a 21-gun salute from the French vessel.

The French government gave the former king an annual pension of eight hundred francs to pay off his debts. He was also given the task of administering over native affairs alongside the French commissioners assigned to the island. Laws that punished adultery and violation of the Sabbath, enacted during the kingdom's Protestant period, were revoked, and the royal monopoly on turtle meat was abolished. Under French rule, Teuruarii was initially allowed to serve as the village chief of Moerai, the main village and former capital in the northeast corner of the island. On 27 June 1934, the French named him honorary chief of Rurutu and his son Rooteatauira as chief of Moerai.

In 1925, Scottish artist William Alister Macdonald (1861–1948) painted a portrait of the former King in later life. According to most sources, Teuruarii IV died in 1933, although his appointment as honorary chief of Rurutu was dated one year after.

== Descendants ==
Teuruarii IV left behind several notable descendants. In 1923, one of his sons, Rooteatauira a Teuruarii, was involved in a controversial embezzlement case that called into question the jurisdiction of French law over native inhabitants of its territories. Rooteatauira, along with his accomplice Tinorrua a Hurahtia, had embezzled various goods to the detriment of Sum-You, a Chinese merchant. In the case, Rooteatauira argued that he should be prosecuted by native law rather than French law and that the annexation was illegal since it was done without the sanctioned of the King of Rurutu or the approval of the French Parliament. However, the French colonial court ruled that the annexation was valid and that he would be prosecuted by French law since the offense was committed against a non-native. Rooteatauira was sentenced to two years in prison and fined fifty francs. In 1934, Rooteatauira was appointed chief of Moerai and given an annual pension of seven hundred and twenty francs.

Rooteatauira was the father of Toromona (Solomon) Teuruarii, who served as mayor of Rurutu in the 1970s. On 14 October 1964, Toromona ran unsuccessfully for a position in the French Territorial Assembly with Tetuamanuhiri Tetaumatani as his running mate, although he did manage to win a significant number of votes. Toromona's son Maeua, born in 1941, bears the title Teuruarii VII. Another descendant, Atitoa a Teuruarii, was the district chief of the southern portion of the island before World War II. His sons, Amaiterai and Tairi a Teuruarii, owned much of the land in the northwestern districts of Teautamatea and Vitaria, the ancestral lands of the Teuruarii royal line, where the remains of the island's ancient temple (Marae Tararoa) still stand.

Many of Teuruarii's living descendants still reside in the villages of Moerai and Avera and play major roles in island's affairs.

== Bibliography ==
- Annuaire des établissements français de l'Océanie pour 1892. Imprimérie du gouvernement. 1892. pp. 111, 207–208.
- Babadzan, Alain (1982). Naissance d'une tradition: changement culturel et syncrétisme religieux aux îles Australes (Polynésie française) (PDF). ORSTOM.
- Brun, Michel; Tetahiotupa, Edgar (2007). Eteroa: mythes, légendes et traditions d'une île polynésienne. Gallimard. ISBN 978-2070777082.
- Craig, Robert D. (2002). Historical Dictionary of Polynesia. Vol. 39 (2 ed.). Scarecrow Press. ISBN 0-8108-4237-8.
- Dareste, Pierre, ed. (1923). "Jurisprudence Coloniale". Recueil de législation, de doctrine et de jurisprudence coloniales. Vol. 26. Marchal & Billard.
- Etablissements Français de l'Océanie (1932). Journal Officiel des Etablissements Français de l'Océanie, Année 1932 (PDF). Etablissements Français de l'Océanie.
- Etablissements Français de l'Océanie (1934). Journal Officiel des Etablissements Français de l'Océanie, Année 1934 (PDF). Etablissements Français de l'Océanie.
- Great Britain, Foreign and Commonwealth Office, ed. (1903). British and Foreign State Papers, Volume 92. Harrison and Sons, London.
- Goff, Frank (1896). "The South Sea Islands". The Latter-Day Saints' Millennial Star. Vol. 58. P. P. Pratt. pp. 609–615.
- Henry, Teuira; Orsmond, John Muggridge (1928). Ancient Tahiti. Vol. 48. Bernice Pauahi Bishop Museum.
- Knowles, Sir James (1886). The Nineteenth Century, Volume 20. Henry S. King & Co.
- Lemaitre, Yves (1976). Ambiguité et chansons polynésiennes de Rurutu (PDF). ORSTOM.
- Malogne, Gwendoline (1993). "Tatou the Co-operative: Between Economic Development and Identity in French Polynesia" (PDF). NZACL Yearbook.
- Marin, Aylic [in French] (1885). "Promenades en Océanie: les Tubuaï et l'archipel de Cook". In Charton, Édouard (ed.). Le Tour du monde, Volumes 50. L. Hachette et cie. pp. 209–214.
- Mourey, Charles; Brunel, Louis, eds. (1900). "Annexion de l'île Rurutu et dépendances". L'Année Coloniale. Vol. 2. C. Tallandier. pp. 338–339.
- O'Reilly, Patrick; Teissier, Raoul (1975). Tahitiens: répertoire biographique de la Polynésie française (2nd ed.). Paris: Musée de l'homme. OCLC 164090777.
- Saura, Bruno [in French] (2008a). "Les Généalogies de Rurutu sont-elles vraies? ou Comment on écrit l'histoire en Polynésie". In Société des Études Océaniennes (ed.). Bulletin de la Société des Études Océaniennes (Polynésie orientale), Volume 312. Société des Études Océaniennes. pp. 37–62.
- Saura, Bruno [in French] (2008b). Journal de la Société des Océanistes. Vol. 128. Musée de l'Homme. pp. 167–172.
- Trouillet, Jean-Paul (1889). Questions Coloniales. Lanier et ses fils.
- Vérin, Pierre [in French] (1964). "Notes socio-économiques sur l'île de Rurutu (Polynésie Française)". In Institut de science économique appliquée (ed.). Cahiers: Humanités, économie, ethnologie, sociologie. Paris: Presses Universitaires de France. pp. 99–133. OCLC 10776662.
- Vérin, Pierre [in French] (1969). L'ancienne civilisation de Rurutu (îles Australes, Polynésie française): la période classique. Vol. 33. ORSTOM. ISBN 9782709900379.
