= Anapoto =

- Associated commune of Rimatara
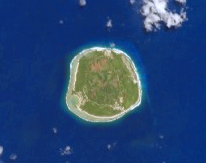
- Rimatara, the island on which Anapoto is located

- Location within French Polynesia
- Location of Anapoto
- Coordinates: 22°38′37″S 152°49′9″W
- Country: France
- Overseas collectivity: French Polynesia
- Subdivision: Austral Islands
- Commune: Rimatara
- Elevation: 11 m (36 ft)
- Population (2022): 278
- Time zone: UTC−10:00

Anapoto is an associated commune on the island of Rimatara, in French Polynesia. According to the 2022 census, it had a population 278.
