= Avera, Rurutu =

Avera
- Associated commune of Rurutu
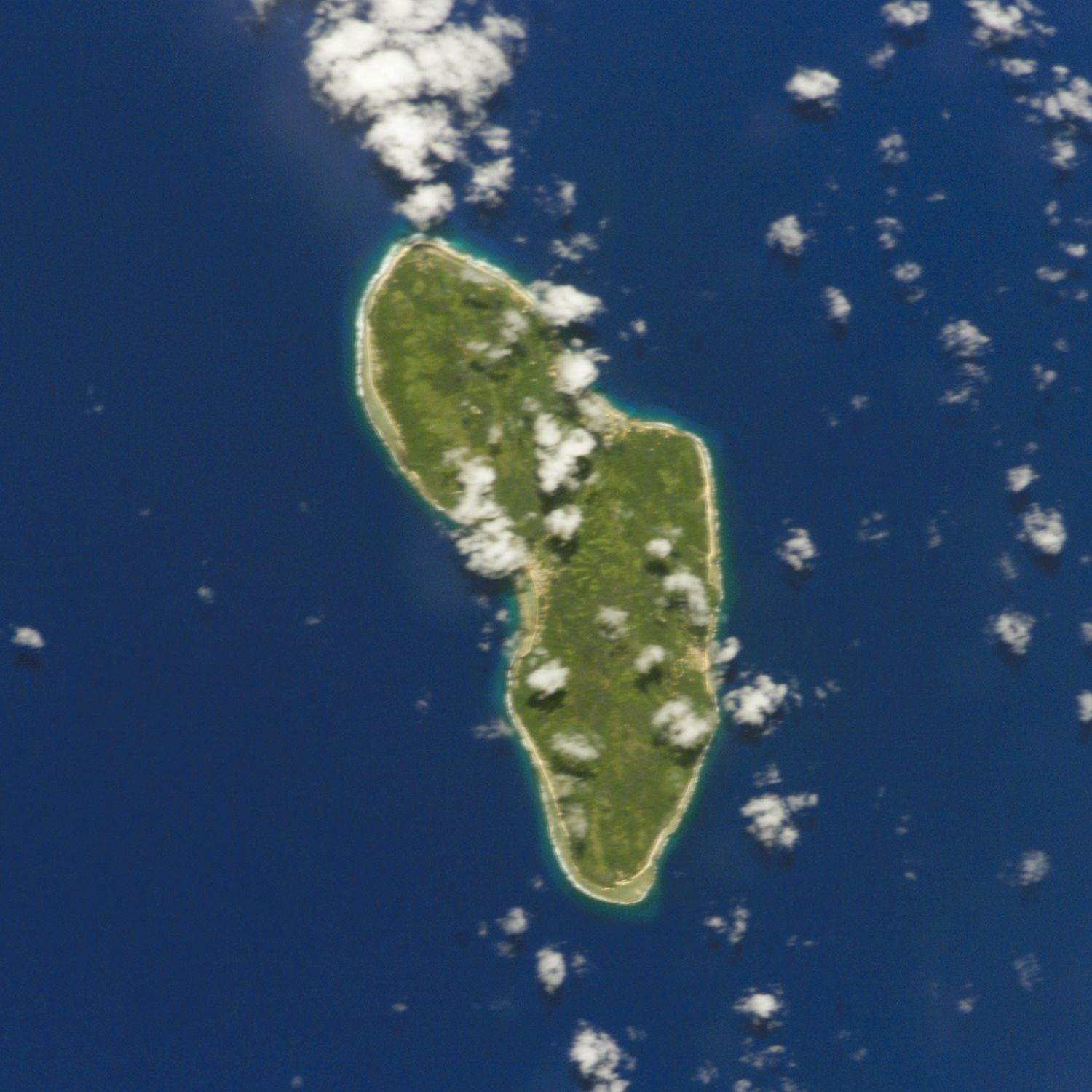
- Rurutu, the island on which Avera is located

- Location within French Polynesia
- Location of Avera
- Coordinates: 22°48′0″S 151°35′0″W
- Country: France
- Overseas collectivity: French Polynesia
- Subdivision: Austral Islands
- Commune: Rurutu
- Elevation: 22 m (72 ft)
- Population (2022): 770
- Time zone: UTC−10:00

Avera is an associated commune on the island of Rurutu, in French Polynesia. It is the smaller of two villages in French Polynesia with this name, the other being located on the island of Raiatea. According to the 2022 census, it had a population of 770. Its elevation is 22 m (72 ft).
