= Rimatara =

Island in French Polynesia

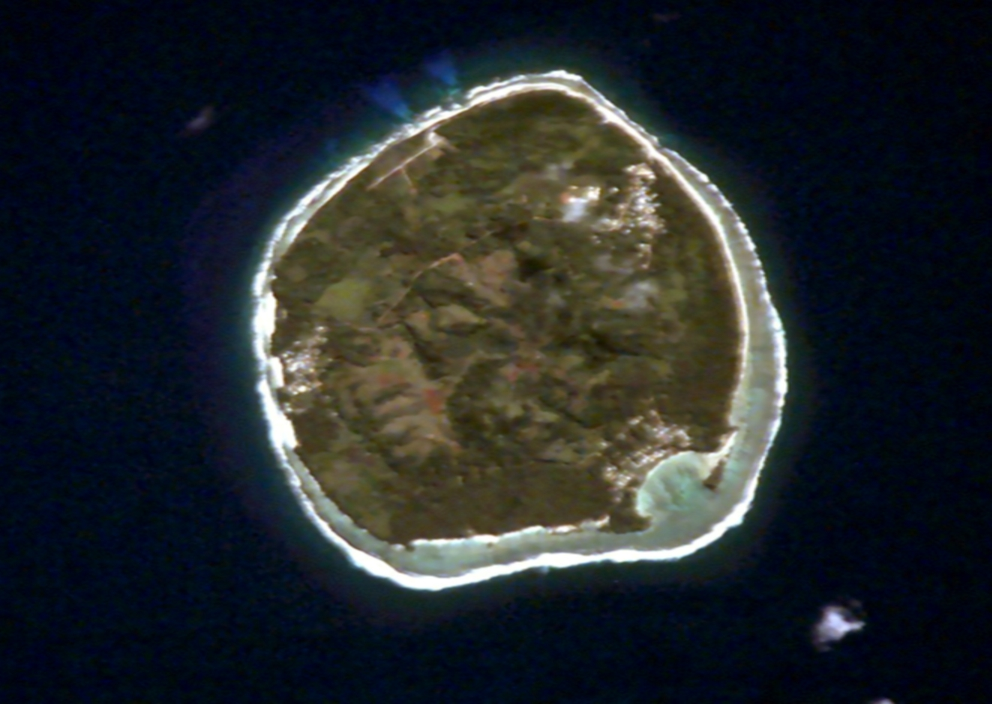
- NASA picture of Rimatara Island

- Location within French Polynesia

Geography
- Location: Pacific Ocean
- Coordinates: 22°39′0″S 152°49′12″W
- Archipelago: Australes
- Area: 8.6 km^{2} (3.3 sq mi)
- Highest elevation: 83 m (272 ft)
- Highest point: Mount Uahu
- Commune: Rimatara
- Largest settlement: Amaru

Rimatara is the westernmost inhabited island in the Austral Islands of French Polynesia. It is located 550 km (340 mi) south of Tahiti and 150 km (93 mi) west of Rurutu. The land area of Rimatara is 8.6 km^{2} (3.3 sq mi), and that of the Maria islets is 1.3 km^{2} (0.50 sq mi). Its highest point is 106 m (348 ft). Its population was 893 at the 2022 census.

The main villages are Amaru (the capital), Anapoto and Mutuaura.

== Geology ==
Rimatara is a raised coral atoll. It was likely formed by the Arago hotspot between between 4.8 and 28.6 million years ago. It was later uplifted by the action of a second hotspot, raising the reef 10m above sea-level and forming a plateau or makatea.

The island is surrounded by a coral reef with a shallow lagoon.

== History ==
According to genetic studies Rimatara was first settled by Polynesians from Tubuai, around 1340.

It was one of the last Polynesian islands to receive European visitors. Captain Samuel Pinder Henry contacted the island in 1811. Two Tahitian missionaries from Bora Bora arrived in 1821 and established a Protestant mission. In 1888 the Queen of Rimatara, along with the King of Rurutu, petitioned Queen Victoria for a British protectorate. France established a protectorate in 1889 and annexed Rimatara in 1901. In 1938 the French colonial government closed the island, along with the rest of the Austral islands, to all outsiders.

== Administration ==
Rimatara
- Commune
- Flag

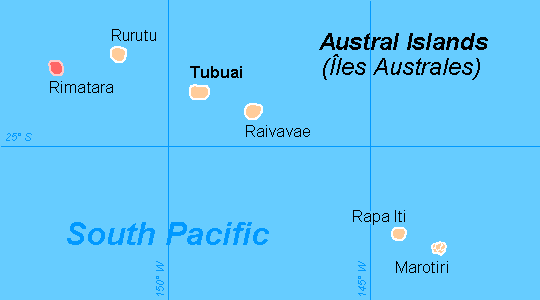
- Location of Rimatara
- Coordinates: 22°39′S 152°49′W
- Country: France
- Overseas collectivity: French Polynesia
- Subdivision: Austral Islands

Government
  - Mayor (2020–2026): Artigas Hatitio
- Area^{1}: 9.9 km^{2} (3.8 sq mi)
- Highest elevation: 83 m (272 ft)
- Lowest elevation: 0 m (0 ft)
- Population (2022): 893
  - Density: 90/km^{2} (230/sq mi)
- Time zone: UTC−10:00
- INSEE/Postal code: 98743 /98752
- ^{1} French Land Register data, which excludes lakes, ponds, glaciers > 1 km^{2} (0.386 sq mi or 247 acres) and river estuaries.

The commune of Rimatara consists of the island of Rimatara, and the uninhabited Maria Islets (Îlots Maria). Rimatara consists of the following associated communes:

- Amaru
- Anapoto
- Mutuaura

== Notable people ==
- Tamaeva IV, queen of Rimatara
- Tamaeva V, queen of Rimatara
- Tamaeva VI, queen of Rimatara

== See also ==
- Rimatara Airport
