= Îles Maria =

Atoll in French Polynesia

Native name: Nororotu
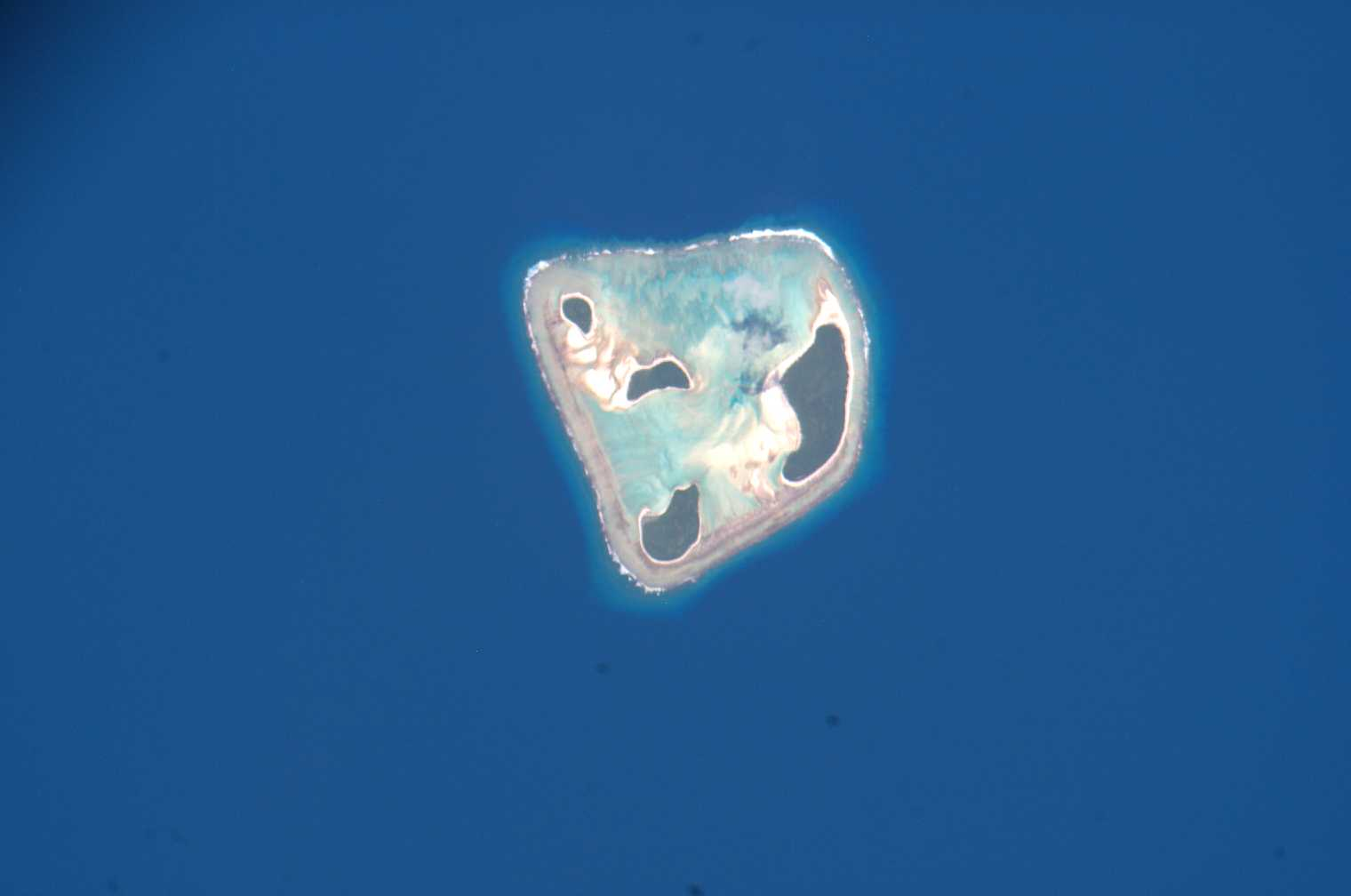
- NASA picture of Îles Maria

- Location within French Polynesia

Geography
- Location: Pacific Ocean
- Coordinates: 21°48′S 154°41′W
- Archipelago: Australes
- Total islands: 4
- Area: 1.9 km^{2} (0.73 sq mi)

Administration
- France
- Overseas collectivity: French Polynesia
- Administrative subdivision: Australes
- Commune: Rimatara

Demographics
- Population: Uninhabited (2012)

Îles Maria or simply Maria, also known as Hull Island, is a small coral atoll in the Pacific Ocean. Its original name is Nororotu. The nearest island is Rimatara situated 205 kilometres (127 miles) to the ESE.

The atoll consists of four islets (îles), with a dense atoll forest and a very shallow lagoon, supporting numerous bird species. The atoll is uninhabited. Copra is occasionally harvested at the island.

The four islands are:

1. Île du Sud
2. Île Centrale
3. Île de l' Ouest
4. Île du Nordêt

The Îles Maria should not be confused with Maria Atoll in the Gambier Islands, also in French Polynesia, which is sometimes differentiated with the name "Maria Est" (East). There is also another island once known as Hull Island in the Phoenix Islands, which is now known as Orona.

== History ==
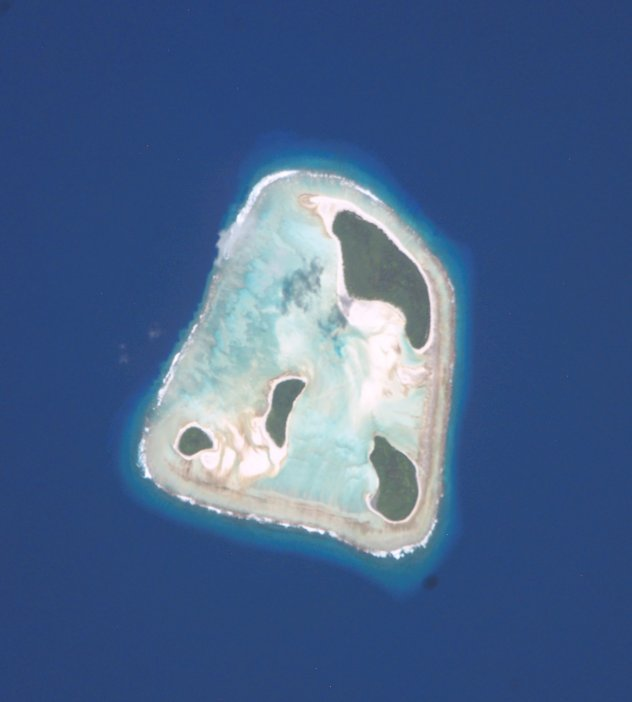
Another NASA image

According to Polynesian legend, the uninhabited island was discovered by Chief Ama'itera'i of Rurutu in ancient times. It was made a place of exile by King Teuruarii IV and his mother and regent Taarouru. The island was also claimed by the neighboring island kingdom of Rimatara. The territorial dispute would not be settled until 1937, when two of the four atolls were awarded to each party. This atoll is named for the whaler Maria, who sighted the island in 1824, It was captained by George Washington Gardner, a Nantucket sea captain (1778–1838).

== Administration ==
The atoll Îles Maria is administratively part of Rimatara commune (municipality) in the Tubuai (Austral Islands) division of French Polynesia.
