= Rurutu =

Island in French Polynesia

- Commune
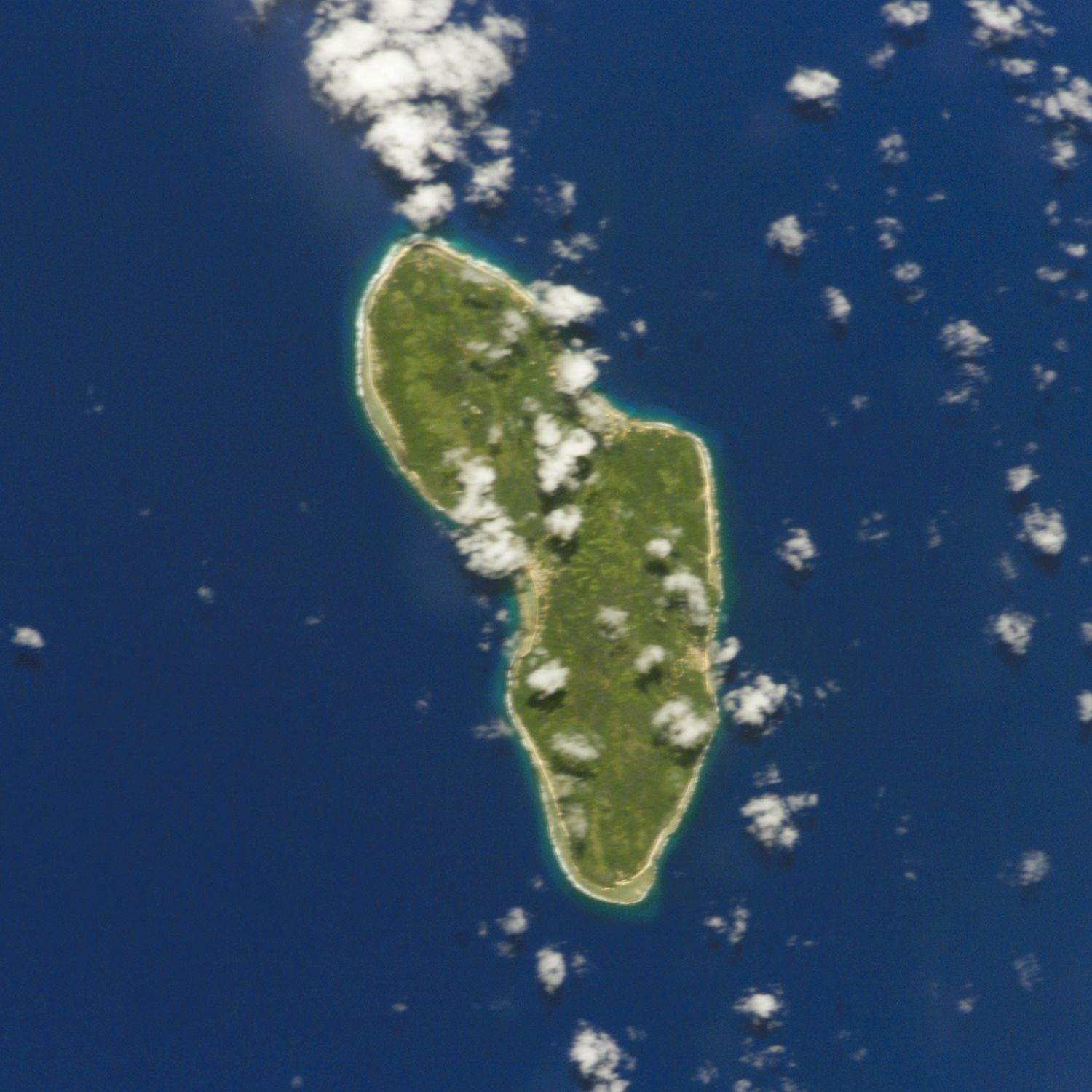
- NASA picture of Rurutu Island

- Flag

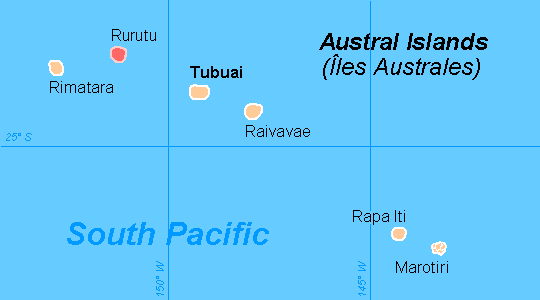
- Location of Rurutu
- Coordinates: 22°28′30″S 151°20′30″W
- Country: France
- Overseas collectivity: French Polynesia
- Subdivision: Austral Islands

Government
  - Mayor (2020–2026): Frédéric Riveta
- Area^{1}: 32.7 km^{2} (12.6 sq mi)
- Highest elevation: 389 m (1,276 ft)
- Lowest elevation: 0 m (0 ft)
- Population (2022): 2,163
  - Density: 66.1/km^{2} (171/sq mi)
- Time zone: UTC−10:00
- INSEE/Postal code: 98744 /98753
- ^{1} French Land Register data, which excludes lakes, ponds, glaciers > 1 km^{2} (0.386 sq mi or 247 acres) and river estuaries.

Rūrutu is the northernmost island in the Austral archipelago of French Polynesia, and the name of a commune consisting solely of that island. It is situated 572 km (355 mi) south of Tahiti. Its land area is 32.7 km^{2} (12.6 sq mi). It is 10.8 km long and 5.3 km wide. Its highest point (Manureva) is 389 m (1,276 ft). At the 2022 census it had a population of 2,163.

Geologically, Rurutu was initially formed 12 million years ago by the Macdonald hotspot, a hotspot associated with the Macdonald seamount. Over the next 10 million years, erosion shrank the island until it was almost an atoll. Then, just over a million years ago, Rurutu passed over the Arago hotspot, which lifted it roughly 150 meters. Steep sea cliffs of ancient coral lifted by the event—called makatea—now largely encircle the island. These are riddled with caves filled with concretions—indeed, Rurutu is largely unique among islands in French Polynesia in that its historic inhabitants were cave-dwelling.

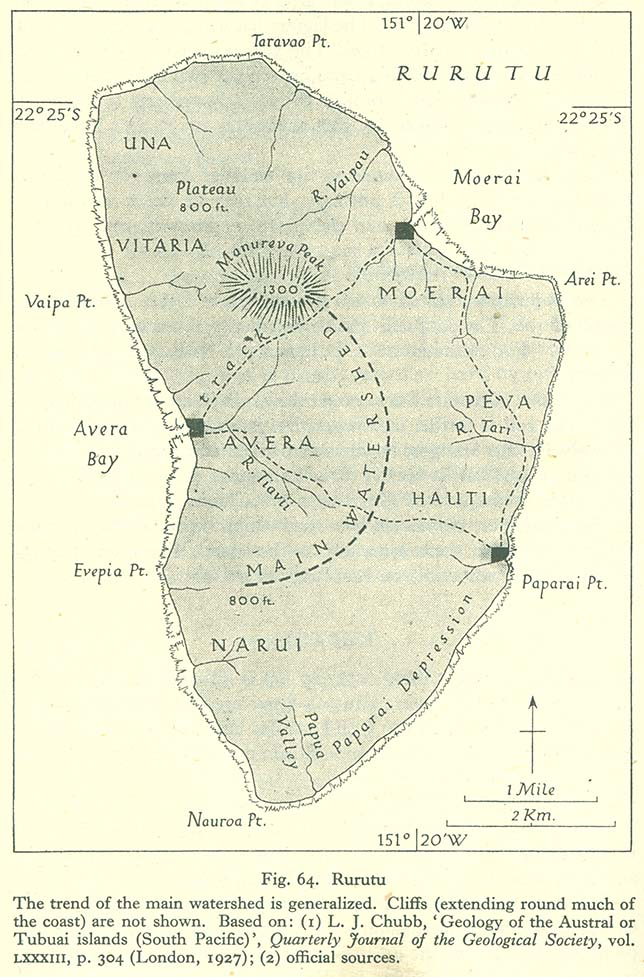
Map of Rurutu c. 1927

Because it is endowed with a fringing reef, Rurutu has in recent years become known for whale watching: humpback whales come and reproduce here between July and October within easy sighting distance from the beach.

== Toponymy ==
The island of Rurutu was formerly known as ‘Eteroa. Its current name, Rurutu, is believed to come from the expression “Rurutu tū noa, i te ono ‘ae.” According to oral tradition, Rurutu tū noa was the name of the war spear of a warrior called ‘Iro i te Pū Manatū, originally from Oropa'a, who is said to have landed on the island around the mid-13th century. Symbolically, it refers to a weapon as formidable and spontaneous as a furious barracuda in pursuit, derived from the Tahitian words ruru (“to gather”), tū (“together” or “to stand”), noa (“spontaneously”), ono (“barracuda”), and ‘ae (“furious”).

== Geography ==
=== Topography ===
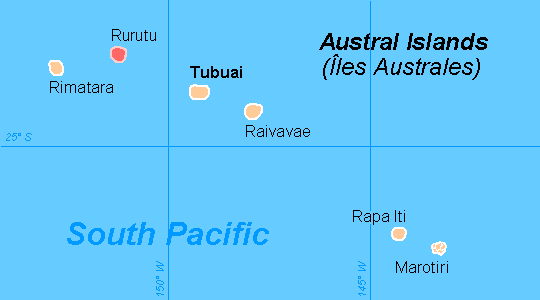
Location of Rurutu within Austral Islands

The volcanic island of Rurutu is located 150 km east of Rimatara, the nearest island, and 572 km south of Tahiti. Measuring about 10 km in length and 3 km at its maximum width, it covers an area of 32.3 km². It is surrounded by a fringing reef (but has no lagoon) and reaches its highest point at Mount Manureva, which rises to 385 meters.

It lies slightly north of the Tropic of Capricorn.

=== Geology ===
Rurutu’s geology is unique. The island was formed about 12 million years ago by the Macdonald hotspot. Over more than 10 million years, its subsidence led to the formation of an atoll. However, just over a million years ago, the island passed over a second hotspot, Mount Arago (Te Tuana'i), which uplifted it by an additional 150 meters. Today, the island is irregularly surrounded by cliffs of raised coral, making it a makatea, riddled with caves lined with mineral formations.

Three peaks resulted from these geological movements: Ta'atio'e (389 m), Manureva (398 m), and Teapei (369 m). They surround the Tetuanui plateau, which serves as an orchard and still hosts subsistence crops.

=== Climate ===
The climate is subtropical oceanic, dominated by easterly trade winds. From January to March, rainfall is heavy and nearly daily.

== History ==
=== Polynesian settlement ===
Between the 10th and 13th centuries, Austronesian navigators from the west—known as the “'Āti Aairi,” and said in oral tradition to have come from Tonga—arrived on Rurutu, landing in the district of Peva. These early inhabitants eventually spread across the entire island.

In the mid-13th century, a first incursion by the Oropa'a people occurred. They came from “Avai” (in Samoa), “Mairerua” (from Maupiti), and “Aunui” (possibly Huahine), then from Ra'ivavae. They were led by 'Iro i te Pū Manatū. Defeated, he returned to Ra'ivavae but left some of his companions behind on the island; they became known as the 'Āti Pa'a.

In the mid-15th century, Tupa'ea and his group, the Te manu 'ura, also Oropa'a from Raivavae, arrived via Tubuai. Once again defeated, they continued on to Rimatara; some returned to Tubuai, while others remained on Rurutu.

Finally, at the very beginning of the 16th century, Toamiriura came from Tubuai and settled on Rurutu, taking a local woman as his partner. After a dispute with his father-in-law over a fishing matter, he called for help from his relatives in Tubuai. Ro'opuipuina, his father and chief of the Tanete'e (of the Oropa'a), and Taneuapoto, chief of the 'Ura, arrived and massacred the Aairi, the island’s original inhabitants. According to Aairi accounts, the defeated people attempted to return to their ancestral lands at Tongatapu, but winds and currents carried them instead to New Zealand.

This marked the beginning of tribal wars on Rurutu, which continued until the mid-18th century, when the 'Ura of Vitaria defeated the Tanete'e of Avera in the Aupoiri cave, located on the land of Ana a'eo.

The most significant ancient site explored on the island is Vitaria, located on the northeast coast between Avera and the airstrip.

=== Discovery by Europeans ===
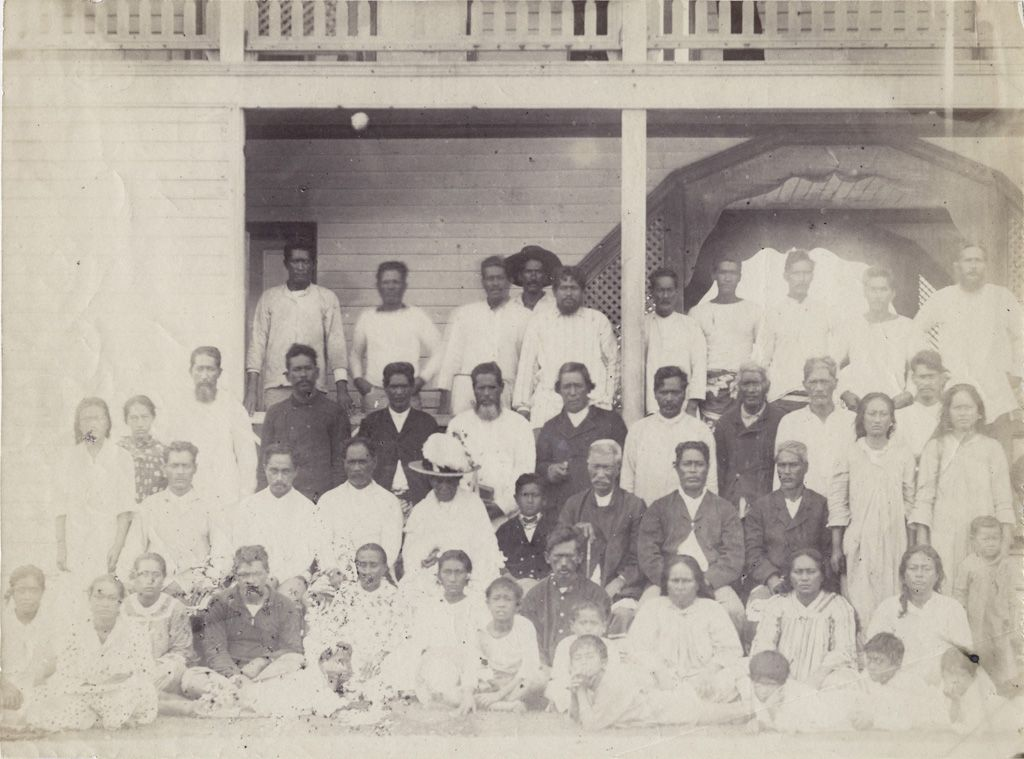
Royal family and chiefs of Rurutu around 1889

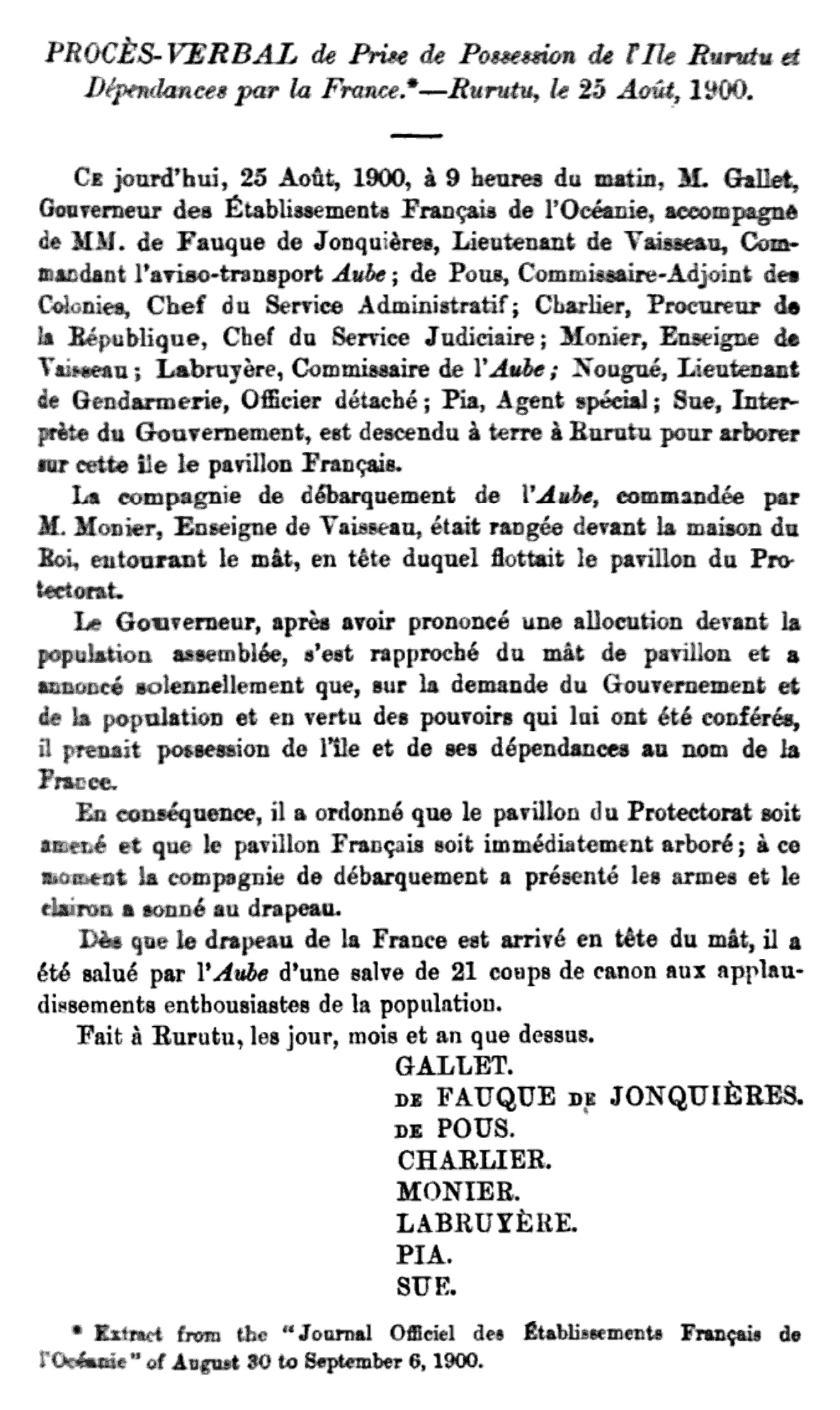
Official record of the French annexation of the island of Rurutu and its dependencies, August 25, 1900

The first recorded sighting of the island by a European was by the British explorer James Cook, who discovered it on August 13, 1769, but was unable to land due to difficult coastal conditions and what appeared to be a hostile attitude from the inhabitants.

In 1821, missionaries from the London Missionary Society, already well established in Tahiti, settled in the Austral Islands, including Rurutu. From 1852 to 1889, a Kingdom of Rurutu existed.

While France established its protectorate over the Kingdom of Tahiti in 1842, after taking control of the Marquesas Islands, Rurutu remained independent until 1889. That year marked the beginning of French protection over the Austral Islands, followed by official annexation in 1900. During the annexation, Governor Gallet reportedly said: “French laws are too complicated for you; you would not understand them. Keep your laws and remain the chiefs of your islands.” It was not until 1946, when the status changed from colony to Overseas Territory, that French laws were applied to Rurutu and Rimatara.

=== Contemporary period ===
Between 1951 and 1956, Rurutu was the residence of navigator Éric de Bisschop, who was tasked with establishing its land registry. After his death in the Cook Islands during the Tahiti Nui expedition (1956–1958), his body was returned and buried in the Moerai cemetery.

With the creation of communes in French Polynesia in 1972, Toromona Teuruarii, a traditional chief and descendant of the royal families, became the first mayor of Rurutu. During this period, the island experienced development, including the construction of a ring road and cross-island routes connecting its three villages. This growth was partly driven by population increases and migration from Makatea in the Tuamotu, Papeete, and Nouméa.

The direct heir to the island’s kings, the Prince of Rurutu—an alumnus of Saint-Cyr and a colonel in the French army—has chosen to remain anonymous rather than return to the island he left as a child.

French President François Mitterrand visited the island in 1990, an event that had some impact on the development of local tourism.

== Administration ==
The commune of Rurutu consists of the island of Rurutu, and is subdivided into the following associated communes:

- Avera
- Hauti
- Moerai

== Economy ==
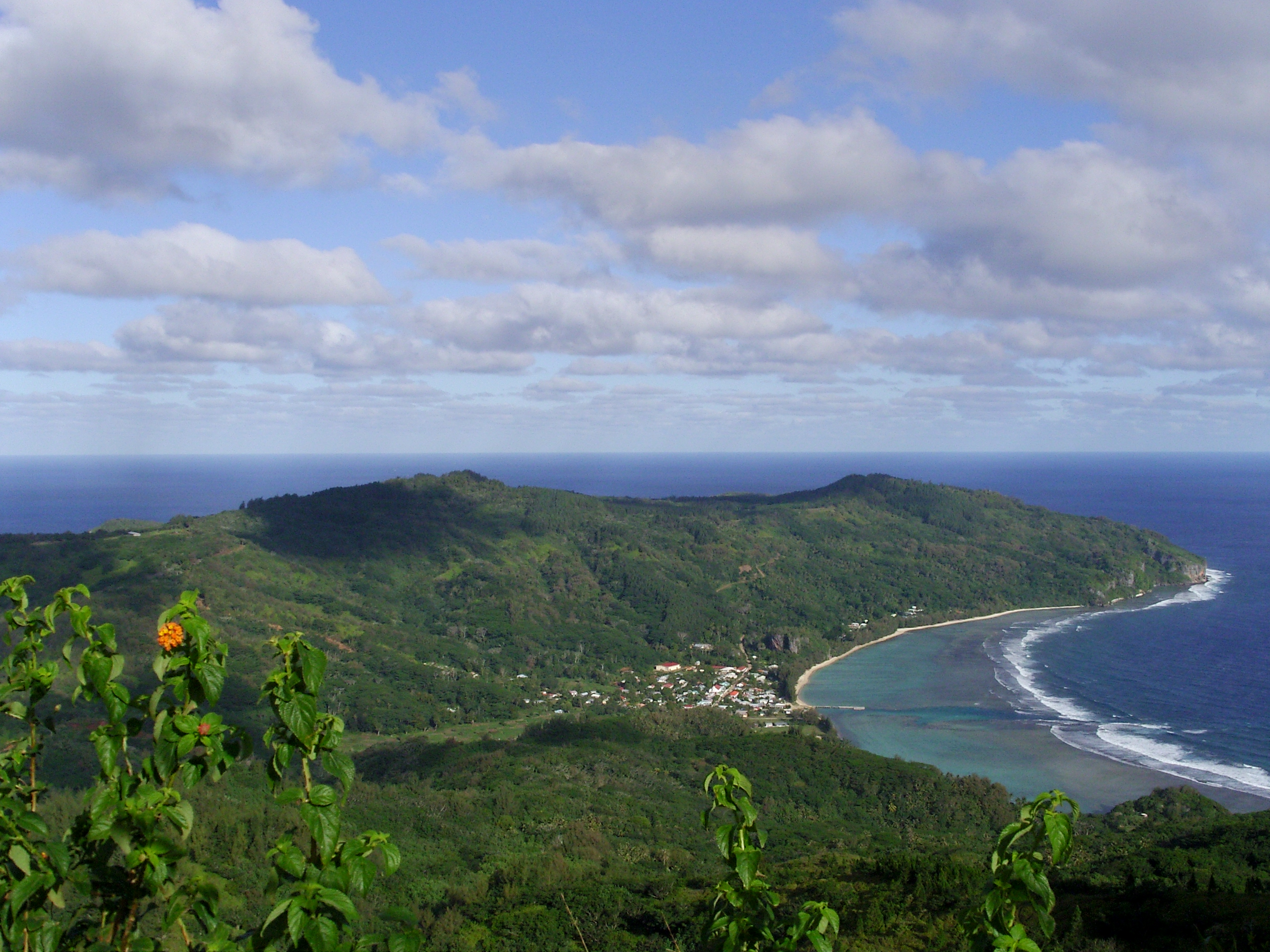
A view of Rurutu taken from the Mount Manureva

Rurutu is well known in French Polynesia for its craftsmanship, especially basket weaving and the use of pandanus fiber, which provides significant income for many families on the island.

Agriculture and fishing remain largely subsistence-based (notably with taro grown in collective plantations). Coffee is also cultivated but has declined: 100 tons per year in the 1960s, down to three tons in 1997; varieties included Red Caturra and later Catimor. Production covered 70 hectares with 60 growers.

Tourism is beginning to develop. In recent years, Rurutu has become known as the “island of whales.” From July to October, whales come to breed just offshore, attracting an international clientele. The island’s authenticity, preserved culture, white sand beaches—Naairoa, Avera, and Arei—its tropical flora, and its caves now attract visitors year-round.

The island has an airstrip with a runway 1,400 meters long, supporting connections with the rest of Polynesia and the growth of tourism. On average, it handles about 600 flights and 18,000 to 22,000 passengers per year, about a quarter of whom are in transit.

== Culture ==
=== Language ===
The language spoken on Rurutu is a variant of the Austral languages, called reo Rurutu, which is quite different from Tahitian. French is the official language there, as it is throughout French Polynesia.

In 2020–2021, the island’s schools experimented with a bilingual education project in which reo Rurutu and French were taught in equal time in kindergarten and primary classes.

=== Traditions ===
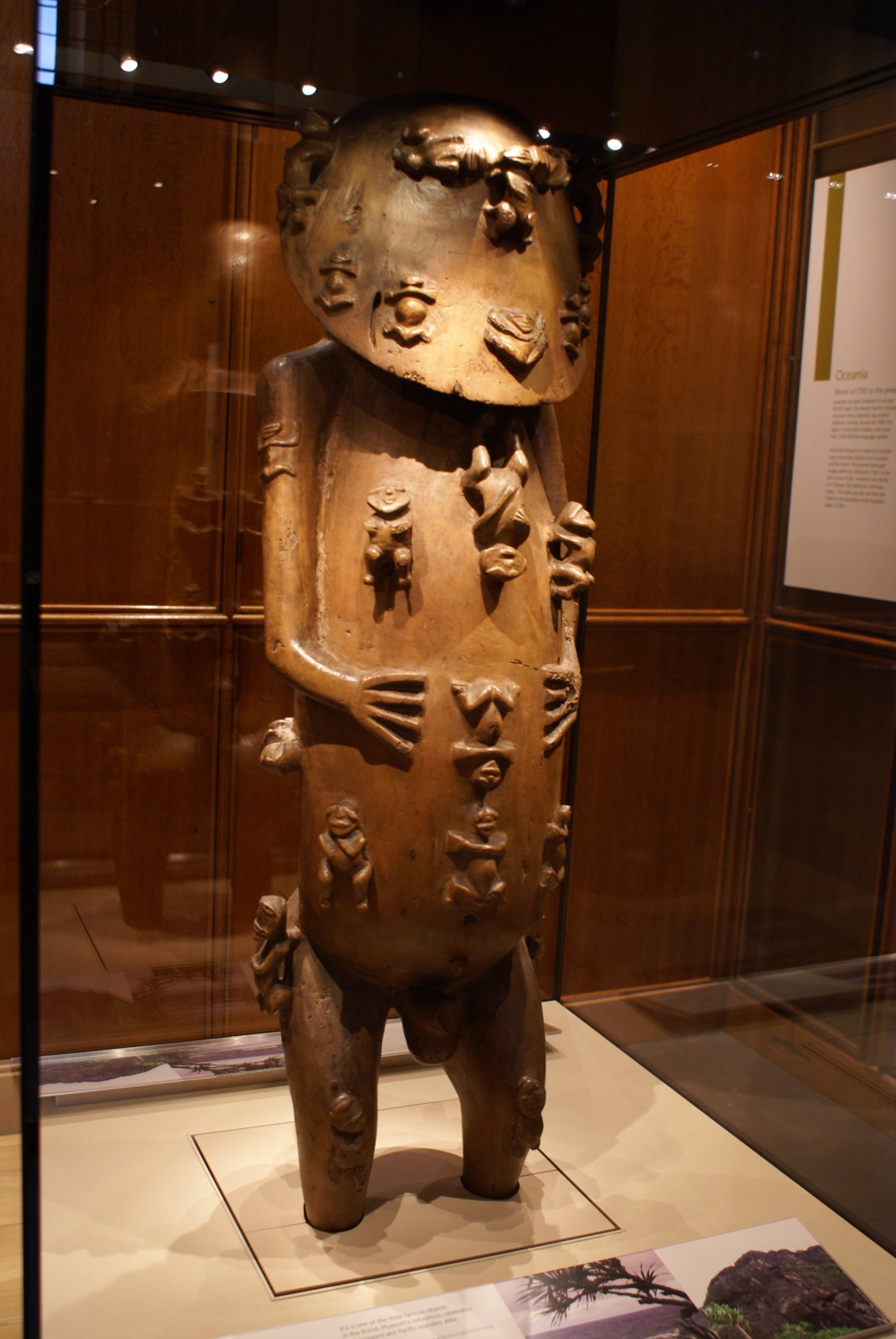
The wooden figure of A'a in the British Museum. The figure is 1.17m high, and has been radiocarbon dated to between 1591 and 1647

Each year in January, the Tere takes place, a kind of pilgrimage during which the population circles the island on foot or horseback while recounting ancestral legends.

The island is known for the worship of the god A'a, whose statue discovered on Rurutu is now kept at the British Museum in London.

== Notable people ==
- Teuruarii IV, last king of Rurutu

== See also ==
- Rurutu Airport
- Statue of A'a from Rurutu

== Bibliography ==
- de La Rüe, Edgard Aubert (1958). "Visages du monde". Tahiti et ses archipels : Polynésie française. Paris: Horizons de France. p. 131.
- Vérin, Pierre (1969). L'ancienne civilisation de Rurutu (îles Australes, Polynésie française) : la période classique (PDF). VER69. Paris: ORSTOM.
- Walker, Taaria (March 1999). Rurutu, mémoires d'avenir d'une île australe. Rurutu.
- "L'Aube des peuples". Eteroa, Mythes, légendes et traditions d'une île polynésienne. Éditions Gallimard. 2007. ISBN 9782070777082.
