= List of members of the Assembly of French Polynesia (2013–2018) =

Members of the Assembly of French Polynesia were elected on 21 April and 5 May 2013. According to second-round results, the 57 representatives consisted of 38 representatives of Tahoera'a Huiraatira, 11 for the Union for Democracy, and 8 for A Tia Porinetia.

== Members ==
Name	Section	Party
Édouard Fritch	Windward Isles 1	Tahoera'a Huiraatira
Teura Iriti	Windward Isles 1	Tahoera'a Huiraatira
Michel Buillard	Windward Isles 1	Tahoera'a Huiraatira
Virginie Bruant	Windward Isles 1	Tahoera'a Huiraatira
Charles Fong Loi	Windward Isles 1	Tahoera'a Huiraatira
Sylvana Puhetini	Windward Isles 1	Tahoera'a Huiraatira
René Temeharo	Windward Isles 1	Tahoera'a Huiraatira
Vaiata Perry-Friedman	Windward Isles 1	Tahoera'a Huiraatira
John Toromona	Windward Isles 1	Tahoera'a Huiraatira
Gaston Flosse	Windward Isles 2	Tahoera'a Huiraatira
Nicole Sanquer	Windward Isles 2	Tahoera'a Huiraatira
Henri Flohr	Windward Isles 2	Tahoera'a Huiraatira
Béatrix Lucas	Windward Isles 2	Tahoera'a Huiraatira
Marcel Tuihani	Windward Isles 2	Tahoera'a Huiraatira
Lois Amaru	Windward Isles 2	Tahoera'a Huiraatira
Tearii Alpha	Windward Isles 2	Tahoera'a Huiraatira
Sandra Levy-Agami	Windward Isles 2	Tahoera'a Huiraatira
Sandrine Turquem	Windward Isles 3	Tahoera'a Huiraatira
Nuihau Laurey	Windward Isles 3	Tahoera'a Huiraatira
Isabelle Sachet	Windward Isles 3	Tahoera'a Huiraatira
Jean Tamauri	Windward Isles 3	Tahoera'a Huiraatira
Elise Vanaa	Windward Isles 3	Tahoera'a Huiraatira
Jean-Christophe Bouissou	Windward Isles 3	Tahoera'a Huiraatira
Dylma Aro	Windward Isles 3	Tahoera'a Huiraatira
Thomas Moutame	Leeward Isles	Tahoera'a Huiraatira
Lana Tetuanui	Leeward Isles	Tahoera'a Huiraatira
Rudolph Jordan	Leeward Isles	Tahoera'a Huiraatira
Patricia Amaru	Leeward Isles	Tahoera'a Huiraatira
Félix Faatau	Leeward Isles	Tahoera'a Huiraatira
Teapehu Teahe	West Tuamotu	Tahoera'a Huiraatira
Moehau Teriitahi	West Tuamotu	Tahoera'a Huiraatira
Monique Richeton	East Tuamotu and Gambiers	Tahoera'a Huiraatira
Jacques Raioha	East Tuamotu and Gambiers	Tahoera'a Huiraatira
Gilda Vaiho	East Tuamotu and Gambiers	Tahoera'a Huiraatira
Joseph Ah-Sha	Marquesas	Tahoera'a Huiraatira
Jeanine Tata	Marquesas	Tahoera'a Huiraatira
Frédéric Riveta	Austral Islands	Tahoera'a Huiraatira
Yolande Viriamu	Austral Islands	Tahoera'a Huiraatira
Richard Tuheiava	Windward Isles 1	Union for Democracy
Chantal Galenon	Windward Isles 1	Union for Democracy
Antony Géros	Windward Isles 2	Union for Democracy
Valentina Cross	Windward Isles 2	Union for Democracy
Jacqui Drollet	Windward Isles 2	Union for Democracy
Oscar Temaru	Windward Isles 3	Union for Democracy
Eliane Tevahitua	Windward Isles 3	Union for Democracy
Justine Teura	Leeward Isles	Union for Democracy
Vito Maamaatuaiahutapu	West Tuamotu	Union for Democracy
Joëlle Frébault	Marquesas	Union for Democracy
Chantal Tahiata	Austral Islands	Union for Democracy
Philip Schyle	Windward Isles 1	A Tia Porinetia
Nicole Bouteau	Windward Isles 1	A Tia Porinetia
Armelle Merceron	Windward Isles 2	A Tia Porinetia
Antonio Perez	Windward Isles 2	A Tia Porinetia
Teva Rohfritsch	Windward Isles 3	A Tia Porinetia
Teura Tarahu	Windward Isles 3	A Tia Porinetia
Gaston Tong Sang	Leeward Isles	A Tia Porinetia
Emma Maraea	Leeward Isles	A Tia Porinetia

== Changes ==
- In September 2014 Édouard Fritch was elected president, and was replaced by Alice Tinorua. Nicole Sanquer, Tearii Alpha, Nuihau Laurey, Jean-Christophe Bouissou, Frédéric Riveta, and René Temeharo were subsequently appointed to his Cabinet, and were replaced by Juliette Nuupure, Putai Taae, Fernand Tahiata, Evans Haumani, Michel Leboucher, and Maina Sage.
- In January 2017 Nicole Bouteau left the Assembly after being appointed Minister of Tourism. She was replaced by Jules Ienfa.
- In October 2017 Nicole Sanquer left Cabinet and returned to the Assembly after being elected to the French National Assembly, displacing Putai Taae.
