= November 2009 French Polynesian presidential election =

An indirect presidential election was held in French Polynesia on Tuesday 24 November 2009, after the opposition, led by Gaston Tong Sang, won a vote of no confidence against the government of incumbent French Polynesia President Oscar Temaru.

The presidential election was the fourth since the 2008 general election. The President is chosen by members of the Assembly of French Polynesia.

In the November election, Gaston Tong Sang became the President of French Polynesia for the third time since December 2006. Tong Sang toppled the government of his predecessor, Oscar Temaru, in a 29–24 vote by the Assembly of French Polynesia in favor of the vote of no confidence. As of November 2009, Tong Sang's coalition government will have a fragile one-seat majority in the Assembly.

Tong Sang himself was similarly ousted by Temaru after the threat of a constructive vote of no confidence caused Tong Sang to step down in February 2009. Temaru had been returned to power in the February 2009 presidential election, held just nine months prior to the November election. Tong Sand supports autonomy with France, while Temaru supports independence.

== Tong Sang forms new cabinet ==
President Tong Sang announced his new cabinet on November 28, 2009, including the new vice president and 12 cabinet ministers, including three members of the private sector who are not politicians. He also retained three cabinet ministers from the preceding February - November 2009 Temaru government.

Tong Sang named Edouard Fritch, the floor leader of the Tahoera'a Huiraatira party in the Assembly, as the new Vice President of French Polynesia.

Tong Sang named the majority of his government's cabinet from the three political parties which provided him with the narrow one-vote majority in the French Polynesia Assembly. The three parties in the November 2009 government were Tong Sang's own pro-autonomy O Porinetia To Tatou Ai'a, the pro-autonomy Tahoera'a Huiraatira and the Te Mana o te Mau Motu, which includes representatives from French Polynesia's outer islands, such as the Tuamotus.

The three cabinet ministers retained from Temaru's previous government were Frédéric Riveta, Tearii Alpha and Teva Rohfritsch. All three are originally members of pro-autonomy parties: Riveta and Rohfritsch were both originally elected to the Assembly as members of the pro-France, pro-Tahitian autonomy Tahoera'a Huiraatira party, while Alpha was elected as a member of Tong Sang's O Porinetia To Tatou Ai'a political party.

Rohfritsch, a banker who had served as the marine resources minister in the Temaru administration (Feb. 2009 - November 2009), was appointed as Tong Sang's minister of economic restructuring. Riveta retained his existing position as economy and agricultural minister in both governments. Alpha, who had served as the minister of public works and urban planning in the previous Temaru government, was appointed the new minister of land affairs, development, housing and public works in Tong Sang's government.

== See also ==
- February 2009 French Polynesian presidential election
