= René Temeharo =

French Polynesian politician

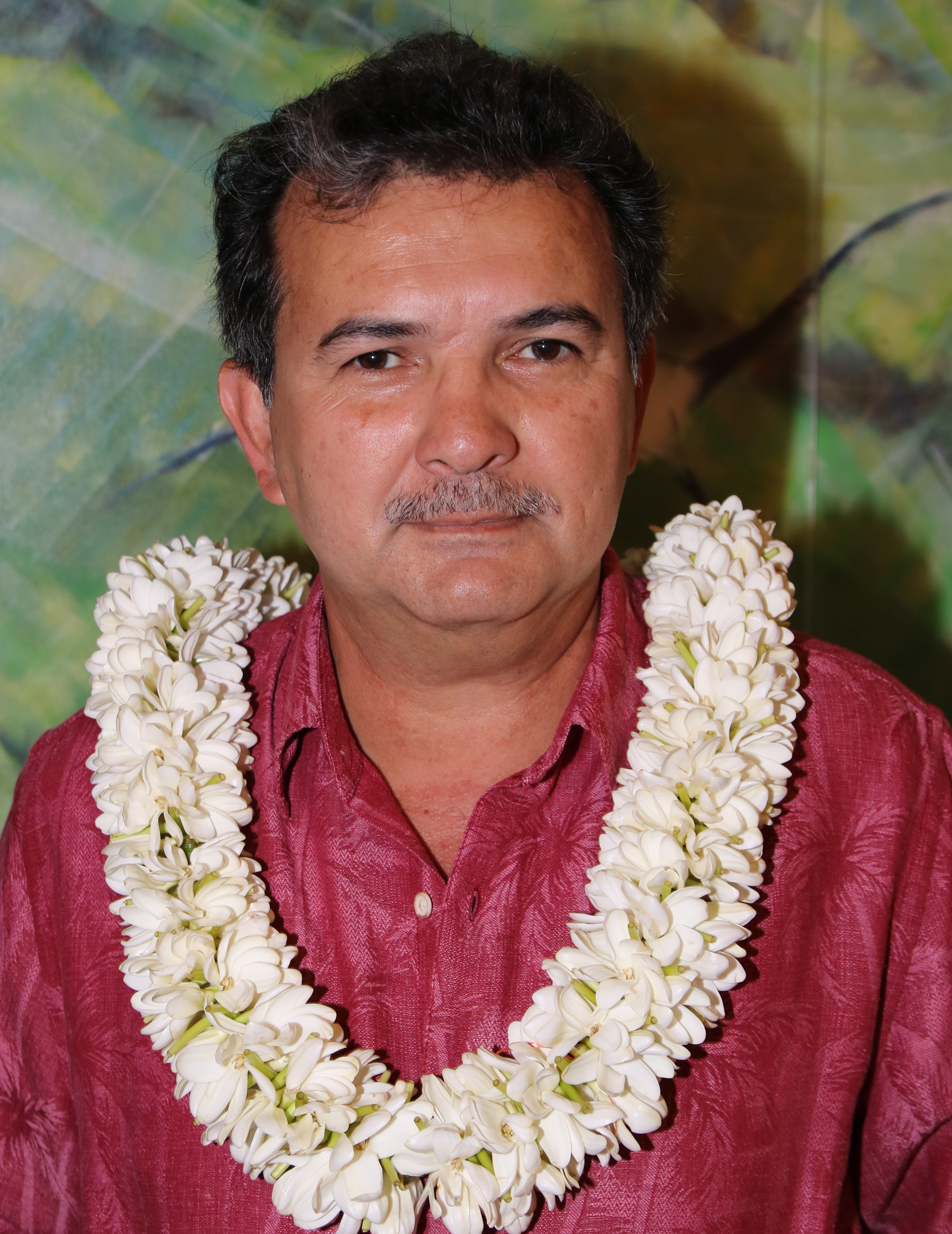
- Temeharo in 2017

Minister of Equipment and Land Transport
- In office 24 May 2018 – 15 May 2023
- President: Édouard Fritch
- Preceded by: Luc Faatau
- Succeeded by: Jordy Chan

Minister of Youth and Sports
- In office 16 September 2014 – 8 October 2015
- Succeeded by: Nicole Sanquer

Member of the French Polynesian Assembly for Windward Isles 1
- In office 5 May 2013 – 6 May 2018

Personal details
- Party: Tahoera'a Huiraatira; Tapura Huiraatira

René Temeharo is a French Polynesian civil servant, politician, and former Cabinet Minister who served in the government of Édouard Fritch.

He first entered the Assembly of French Polynesia in April 2008, replacing Armelle Merceron who had been appointed a Minister. He lost his seat to Merceron following the fall of Gaston Tong Sang's coalition government, but later returned in May 2011 as a replacement for Teva Rohfritsch after he returned to the private sector.

In October 2011 he was convicted alongside a number of other Tahoera'a Huiraatira members in the "phantom jobs" case and sentenced to a three month suspended prison sentence and one year deprivation of civil rights. Following an appeal his sentence was nullified in February 2013. In April 2017 he was one of 11 Tahoera'a members ordered to jointly repay US$2.1 million in the case.

He was re-elected to the Assembly at the 2013 French Polynesian legislative election and elected president of the standing committee. In 2014 he was appointed Minister of Youth and Sports, in charge of Relations with the Assembly of French Polynesia and the Economic, Social and Cultural Council in the government of Édouard Fritch, and as a result surrendered his seat in the Assembly. In May 2015 he joined other supporters of Fritch in leaving the Tahoera'a to found the Tapura Huiraatira; as a result on 26 May 2015 he was ejected from the Tahoera'a. In October 2015 he resigned from the executive and returned to the ranks of the Assembly to strengthen Fritch's majority, his substitute being a supporter of Gaston Flosse. He was replaced in cabinet by Nicole Sanquer.

He ran as a Tapura candidate in the 2018 election, but was not elected. He was subsequently appointed Minister of Equipment and Land Transport. In September 2020 he was given the Major projects portfolio in a cabinet reshuffle following the resignation of Teva Rohfritsch.

In October 2022 he served as the French Polynesian government's delegate to the annual meeting of the United Nations Special Committee on Decolonization.
