= Luc Faatau =

French Polynesian politician

Minister of Equipment and Transport
- In office 13 January 2017 – 24 May 2018
- President: Édouard Fritch
- Preceded by: Albert Solia
- Succeeded by: René Temeharo (Equipment); Jean-Christophe Bouissou (inter-island transport)

Minister of Lands
- In office 2007 – 13 September 2007
- President: Gaston Tong Sang
- In office 26 October 2004 – 3 March 2005
- President: Gaston Flosse

Member of the French Polynesian Assembly for Windward Islands 3
- Incumbent
- Assumed office 23 May 2018

Personal details
- Born: 1959
- Died: Tapura Huiraatira

Luc Faatau (born 1959) is a French Polynesian politician and former Cabinet Minister. He is a member of the Tapura Huiraatira.

Faatau is a former delegate of the Polynesian Society of Authors, Composers and Music Publishers. He served as Minister of Lands in the 2004 cabinet of president Gaston Flosse, and later under Gaston Tong Sang.

In January 2017 he was appointed to the cabinet of Édouard Fritch as Minister of Equipment and Transport. He contested the 2018 French Polynesian legislative election as a candidate for the Tapura Huiraatira. During the campaign he was accused of abusing Ministerial travel for the purposes of campaigning. While not elected, he entered the Assembly of French Polynesia as a replacement for a government Minister after not being reappointed to Cabinet.
