= Teura Iriti =

Tahitian politician

Mayor of Arue
- Incumbent
- Assumed office 30 June 2020
- Preceded by: Philip Schyle

Senator for French Polynesia
- In office 28 September 2014 – 6 February 2015
- Preceded by: Gaston Flosse
- Succeeded by: Lana Tetuanui

Member of the French Polynesian Assembly for Windward Isles 1
- Incumbent
- Assumed office 30 April 2023

Member of the French Polynesian Assembly for Windward Isles 2
- In office 25 May 2004 – 30 April 2023

Personal details
- Born: 7 January 1965 (age 61) Papeete, Tahiti
- Party: Tahoera'a Huiraatira; Tāpura Huiraʻatira
- Profession: Politician

Teura Iriti (born 7 January 1965) is a French Polynesian politician, member of the Assembly of French Polynesia, and former member of the Senate of France. Since June 2020 she has served as Mayor of Arue. Originally a member of Tahoera'a Huiraatira party, she is now a member of Tāpura Huiraʻatira.

She has been President of the Arue, French Polynesia since 2003. She was the head candidate of her party's senatorial party in September 2014, having chaired Tahoeraa Huiraatira's group at the Assembly of French Polynesia: she is elected Senator in the first round with 411 votes. Her election was invalidated on 6 February 2015 by the Constitutional Council of France.

She was re-elected to the Assembly of French Polynesia at the 2013 French Polynesian legislative election.

Candidate in the 2017 legislative elections in the second constituency, Iriti came second in the first round on 3 June, thirteen points behind Nicole Sanquer, Tapura Huiraatira candidate.

In June 2017 she was elected as the Tahoera'a's leader in the Assembly, following the resignation of Marcel Tuihani. She was re-elected in the 2018 election, and was the Tahoera'a's candidate for President of the Assembly, losing to Gaston Tong Sang.

In June 2020 she was elected mayor of Arue, defeating Philip Schyle. The election was overturned in November 2021 due to illegal proxy voting, but she was re-elected in January 2022.

In March 2022 the resignation of two MPs from the party resulted in the Tahoera'a no longer being recognised in the Assembly and Iriti became an unaligned MP. In May 2022 she joined the Tāpura Huiraʻatira. In the 2023 election she ran as a Tapura candidate, and was successfully elected after being placed first on the list of the Windward Isles 1 constituency, ahead of party president Édouard Fritch.
