= Bruno Sandras =

French Polynesian politician

Mayor of Papara
- In office 19 March 2001 – 12 September 2014
- Succeeded by: Christelle Lehartel

Member of the French National Assembly for French Polynesia's 2nd constituency
- In office 20 June 2007 – 19 June 2012
- Preceded by: Beatrice Vernaudon
- Succeeded by: Jonas Tahuaitu

Member of the French Polynesian Assembly for Windward Isles
- In office 2001–2005

Personal details
- Born: 4 August 1961 (age 64) Papeete
- Party: Tahoera'a Huiraatira; Ia Hau Noa; A Tia Porinetia

Bruno Sandras (born 4 August 1961) is a French Polynesian politician and former Cabinet Minister. He was a member of the National Assembly of France from 2007 to 2012, representing the 2nd constituency of French Polynesia, as a member of the Union for a Popular Movement. He was Mayor of papara from 2001 until 2014, when he was dismissed from office after he was convicted of corruption.

Sandras was born in Papeete in French Polynesia. After training as a lawyer, he was general secretary of the A Tia I Mua trade union confederation from 1995 to 2000. He was elected Mayor of Papara in 2001. From 2001 to 2005 he was a member of the Assembly of French Polynesia.

In February 2005 following Jean-Christophe Bouissou's resignation he was appointed to cabinet in Gaston Flosse's government, taking over Buissou's portfolios.

He was elected to the French Assembly in the 2007 French legislative election as a candidate for the UMP. In the assembly he campaigned to retain a French military presence in French Polynesia, and for compensation for French nuclear testing. In 2010 the Nouvelles de Tahiti claimed he was one of the most passive delegates in the assembly, ranking him 516th of 577 members. In 2011 he attended sittings for only 5 weeks. He stood for re-election at the 2012 election, but was eliminated in the first round. Following his departure from the national assembly he worked as a civil servant for the French Polynesian government.

He was re-elected as Mayor of Papara in 2008. In April 2009 he quit Tahoera'a Huiraatira, announcing plans to form a new party. In September 2009 he launched the Ia Hau Noa party. In February 2013, he quit the A Tia Porinetia party after a dispute over his ranking on the party list. In 2014 he was re-elected as mayor of Papara.

At the 2018 French Polynesian legislative election he attempted to establish a party list with La République En Marche!, before signing a coalition agreement with Tahoera'a Huiraatira.

== Corruption charges ==
In December 2009 he was ordered to pay US$100,000 after a court found that the government had unlawfully spent public funds. The order was overturned in 2011. In October 2011 he was convicted for his involvement in the "phantom jobs" scandal and sentenced to a suspended sentence of three months imprisonment and banned from office. The conviction was upheld on appeal in 2014. A further appeal against the ban was rejected in 2015. Following the appeal he was removed as Mayor of Papara.
