= Antony Géros =

French Polynesian politician

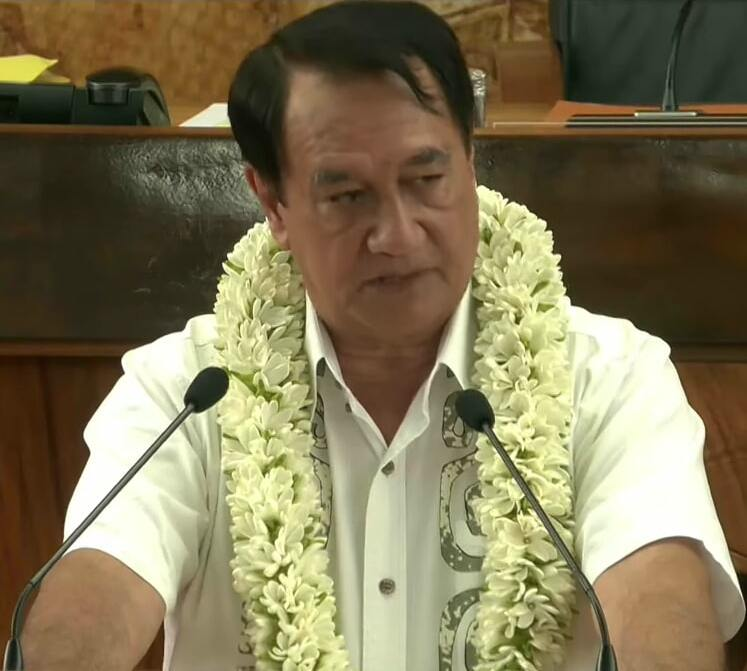
- Géros in 2023

President of the Assembly of French Polynesia
- Incumbent
- Assumed office 11 May 2023
- Preceded by: Gaston Tong Sang
- In office 14 April 2005 – 13 April 2006
- Preceded by: Hirohiti Tefaarere
- Succeeded by: Philip Schyle
- In office 3 June 2004 – 16 November 2004
- Preceded by: Lucette Taero
- Succeeded by: Hirohiti Tefaarere

Mayor of Paea
- Incumbent
- Assumed office 3 July 2020
- Preceded by: Jacquie Graffe
- Succeeded by: Hirohiti Tefaarere

Vice-President of French Polynesia
- In office 1 April 2011 – 17 May 2013
- President: Oscar Temaru
- Preceded by: Tearii Alpha
- Succeeded by: Nuihau Laurey
- In office 16 February 2009 – 24 November 2009
- President: Oscar Temaru
- Preceded by: Jules Ienfa
- Succeeded by: Édouard Fritch
- In office 13 September 2007 – 23 February 2008
- President: Oscar Temaru
- Preceded by: Temauri Foster
- Succeeded by: Édouard Fritch

Member of the French Polynesian Assembly for Windward Isles 2
- Incumbent
- Assumed office 12 November 1999

Personal details
- Born: 22 July 1956 (age 70) Papeete, French Polynesia
- Party: Union for Democracy; Tavini Huiraatira

Antony Daniel Teva Géros (French pronunciation: [ɑ̃tɔni danjɛl teva ʒeʁɔs]; born 22 July 1956) is a French Polynesian politician and current President of the Assembly of French Polynesia. He has previously served as a Cabinet Minister, and three times as Vice-President of French Polynesia. Since 2020 he has served as Mayor of Paea. He is a member of pro-independence party Tavini Huiraatira.

== Early life ==
Géros was born in Papeete and worked as secretary of the town of Faaa before entering politics. He joined the pro-independence Tavini Huiraatira party in 1986, and has served on the municipal council of Paea since 1995. He first entered the Assembly of French Polynesia in November 1999 as a replacement for Alexandre Léontieff, who had been convicted of corruption. He was re-elected at the 2001 election.

== President of the Assembly of French Polynesia ==
Géros was elected as President of the Assembly following the 2004 French Polynesian legislative election, winning by a single vote over Emile Vernaudun. Following his election he controversially installed a crucifix in the Assembly, resulting in the Greens leaving the Union for Democracy coalition. The crucifix was removed by President Oscar Temaru in September 2004. he was replaced by his deputy Hirohiti Tefaarere after the French Council of State annulled the 2004 election in November 2004. He was re-elected to the Assembly in the resulting by-elections, and re-elected as President of the Assembly in the second round of voting. He was replaced by Philip Schyle at the end of his one-year term in 2006, losing by a single vote.

== Cabinet Minister ==
Following Oscar Temaru's re-election as President of French Polynesia in September 2007 Géros joined his cabinet as Vice-President and Minister of Finance. In December 2007 his budget failed to pass the Assembly. He ran again for Assembly President following the 2008 French Polynesian legislative election, but lost to Édouard Fritch. Two days later a power-sharing agreement with Tahoeraa Huiraatira saw Gaston Flosse re-elected as President, with Géros joining his cabinet as Lands Minister. He resigned as a Minister in April 2008 after Flosse lost a confidence vote in the Assembly, returning to the Assembly in July 2008. He served as vice-President in Temaru's fourth government from February to November 2009, and again in Temaru's fifth government from April 2011 to May 2013. In September 2012 he replaced Pierre Frébault as Minister of Finance in a cabinet reshuffle.

He was re-elected to the Assembly at the 2013 election, and was the Union For Democracy's candidate for President. Following the unseating of Édouard Fritch for corruption in September 2014 he again stood unsuccessfully for Assembly President, losing to Marcel Tuihani.

He was re-elected again at the 2018 election. Following the unseating of Oscar Temaru for breaching election campaign rules, he became leader of the Tavini Huiraatira in the Assembly. He later criticised the French courts for being manipulated by the government and punishing Temaru for seeking justice for French Polynesia before the International Criminal Court.

In June 2020 he was elected mayor of Paea. In November 2020 he was elected President of the Superior Council of Municipal Civil Service.

He was re-elected to the Assembly in the 2023 election. On 11 May 2023 he was elected President of the Assembly for the third time, with 41 votes in favour and 16 abstentions.

== Political views ==
Géros supported the restoration of French Polynesia to the United Nations list of non-self-governing territories, and supports French Polynesian independence as a way of recognising the rights of the Maohi people. He has repeatedly criticised France's refusal to engage with the United nations decolonization process.

In 2010 he described French nuclear weapons testing at Moruroa as a crime against the people of Polynesia.
