= Jules Ienfa =

French Polynesian politician

Minister of Health
- In office 30 November 2009 – 1 December 2010
- President: Gaston Tong Sang
- Succeeded by: Nicolas Bertholon
- In office 20 April 2008 – 12 February 2009
- In office 29 December 2006 – 13 September 2007
- Succeeded by: Charles Tetaria

Minister of Ecology
- In office 30 November 2009 – 1 December 2010
- President: Gaston Tong Sang
- Succeeded by: Nicolas Bertholon

Vice-President of French Polynesia
- In office 20 April 2008 – 12 February 2009
- President: Gaston Tong Sang

Member of the French Polynesian Assembly for Windward Isles 1
- In office 3 February 2017 – 6 May 2018

Personal details
- Party: A Tia Porinetia; Tāpura Huiraʻatira

Jules Ienfa is a French Polynesian medical doctor, politician, and former Cabinet Minister, who served as Vice-President of French Polynesia and Minister of Health in the government of Gaston Tong Sang.

Ienfa previously worked as head doctor of the child protection services. He worked as an adviser to health minister Michel Buillard, and then for Assembly President Justin Arapari. He returned to the health department, ultimately rising to the position of director, but was sacked by Oscar Temaru.

In December 2007, he was appointed to the cabinet of Gaston Tong Sang as Minister of Health and Solidarity. He lost the position when Tong Sang's government was replaced by that of Oscar Temaru, but was appointed as vice president and Minister of Health when Tong Sang regained power in April 2008. As Health Minister, he signed a deal with France to clean up Hao atoll, which had been used as a military base to support French nuclear testing. He again lost the role due to a change of government, but was reappointed as Minister of Health and Ecology in November 2009. He resigned for personal reasons in November 2010, and was replaced by Nicolas Bertholon. His wife, Maud Ienfa, died in February 2011.

He ran in the 2013 election as a candidate for A Tia Porinetia, but was not elected. In 2014 he ran unsuccessfully for Mayor of Papeete. He re-entered the Assembly in January 2017 as a replacement for Nicole Bouteau after she was appointed Minister of Tourism.
