= Charles Tetaria =

French Polynesian athlete, medical doctor, and politician

Minister for Health and Solidarity
- In office 5 April 2011 – 17 May 2013
- President: Oscar Temaru
- Succeeded by: Béatrice Chansin (health); Gaston Flosse (solidarity)
- In office 20 September 2007 – 23 February 2008
- Preceded by: Jules Ienfa
- In office 1982–1986

Member of the French Polynesian Assembly for Windward Isles
- In office 23 May 1982 – 15 March 1986

Personal details
- Born: 1 January 1947 (age 79) Papeete, French Polynesia
- Party: Tahoera'a Huiraatira

Charles Tetaria
Sport
- Country: French Polynesia
- Sport: Athletics
Medal record
Men's Athletics
Representing Tahiti
Pacific Games
Gold medal – first place	1971 Pirae	4 x 100m relay
Gold medal – first place	1971 Pirae	Decathlon
Bronze medal – third place	1971 Pirae	110m Hurdles
Silver medal – second place	1969 Port Moresby	110m Hurdles
Bronze medal – third place	1969 Port Moresby	Decathlon
Gold medal – first place	1966 Nouméa	Long Jump
Silver medal – second place	1966 Nouméa	110m Hurdles
Bronze medal – third place	1966 Nouméa	4 x 100m relay
Gold medal – first place	1963 Suva	110m Hurdles
Bronze medal – third place	1963 Suva	Long Jump

Charles Tetaria (born 1 January 1947) is a French Polynesian athlete, medical doctor, politician, and former Cabinet Minister. He has represented France at the South Pacific Games. He is an advocate for the Tahitian language and a member of the Tahitian Academy.

Tetaria was born in Papeete, but moved to France at the age of 15 to pursue his athletic career. He competed in the 1963 South Pacific Games in Suva, winning gold in the 110m hurdles and bronze in the long jump. At the 1966 South Pacific Games in Nouméa, New Caledonia, winning gold in the long jump, silver in the 110m hurdles, and bronze in the 4 × 100 m relay. At the 1969 South Pacific Games in Port Moresby, he won silver in the 110m hurdles and bronze in the decathlon. At the 1971 South Pacific Games in Pirae he won gold in the decathlon and 4 × 100 m relay, and bronze in the 110m hurdles.

After training as a medical doctor, he returned to French Polynesia in 1976. He worked in a blood transfusion centre and medical laboratories, and as a volunteer for the Olympic Committee of French Polynesia.

He was elected to the Assembly of French Polynesia as a Tahoera'a Huiraatira candidate at the 1982 French Polynesian legislative election and appointed Minister of Health and Social Affairs.

In November 2006 he was appointed Minister of Health again in the government of Oscar Temaru, following the resignation of Pia Hiro. He held the position until the Temaru government was toppled in December. He was reappointed with Temaru's other cabinet ministers in September 2007, holding office until February 2008. When Temaru returned as president following a confidence vote in April 2011 he was appointed Minister of Health and Solidarity. He lost the position following the 2013 election.

In June 2017, he was appointed to the Tahitian Academy, replacing Patua Coulin.

In June 2019, he was appointed a Knight of the Order of Tahiti Nui.
