= Chantal Galenon =

French Polynesian politician and women's rights activist

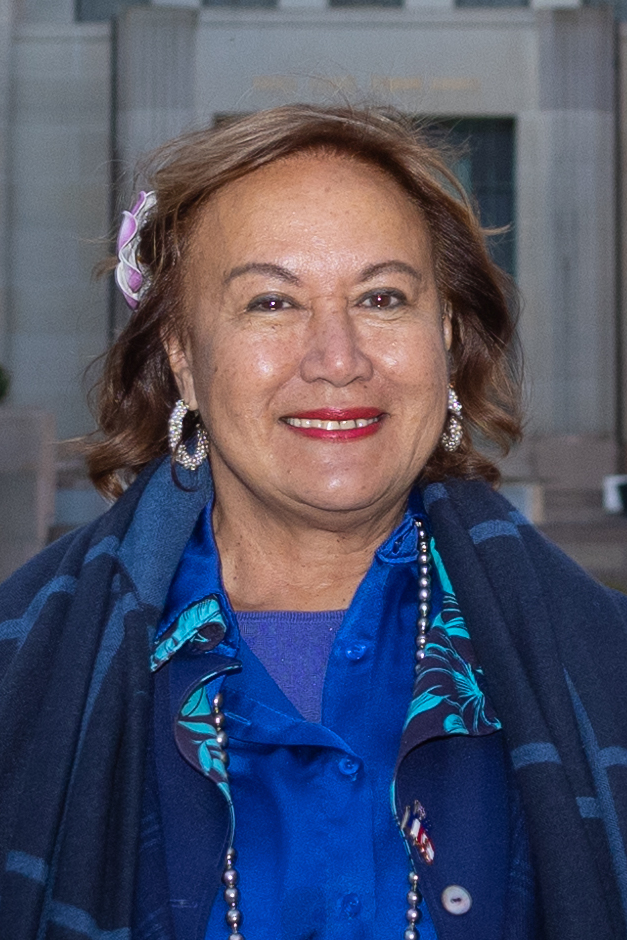
- Galenon in 2024

Vice-President of French Polynesia
- Incumbent
- Assumed office 3 June 2024
- President: Moetai Brotherson
- Preceded by: Eliane Tevahitua

Minister of Solidarity and Housing
- Incumbent
- Assumed office 15 May 2023
- President: Moetai Brotherson
- Preceded by: Virginie Bruant (Solidarity); Jean-Christophe Bouissou (Housing)

Member of the French Polynesian Assembly for Windward Isles 1
- Incumbent
- Assumed office 29 January 2008

Personal details
- Born: 1956 (age 69–70) Tahiti
- Party: Union for Democracy; Tavini Huiraatira

Minarii Chantal Galenon-Taupua (born 1956) is a French Polynesian teacher, women's rights activist, politician, and Cabinet Minister. She has been Vice-President of French Polynesia since 3 June 2024. She has been an elected member of the French Polynesian Assembly since 2008 and is President of the French Polynesian Women's Council.

== Biography ==
Galenon was born on Tahiti and grew up in Patutoa in Papeete. A former primary school teacher, from 2001 to 2008 Galenon served on Papeete Municipal Council. From 2008 she was an elected member of the French Polynesian Assembly representing the a Union for Democracy (UPLD) party. She was previously a supporter of Tahoeraa Huiraatira, but resigned from the party in December 2009. Her resignation meant she stood as an independent candidate, an action that meant that Gaston Tong Sang lost his majority. In 2011 hers was the casting vote in the no confidence motion that ended the presidency of Tong Sang.

In 2014 she joined the board of Pu o te Hau - the only women's shelter in the territory. In 2018 she spoke out against the cover designed for the brochure of the Tifaifai International Festival, which featured a naked Polynesian woman. Galenon was quoted as saying: "Nous souhaitons que l’image de la femme polynésienne soit basée sur des valeurs… Non plus considérée comme un objet d’exposition ! Il faut arrêter ce cliché." ["We want the image of Polynesian women to be based on values… No longer considered as an object of exhibition!"] She is President of the French Polynesian Women’s Council. She is also President of the Association Vahine Piri Rava. The organisation works to protect and develop women's rights in the territory, especially in terms of health.

In 2021 Galenon appealed to the United Nations General Assembly on behalf of the people of French Polynesia whose health has been affected by nuclear testing undertaken by the French government between the 1960s and the 1990s. The same year she voted in favour of a compulsory vaccination programme for certain occupations in response to the COVID-19 pandemic.

She was re-elected to the Assembly in the 2023 election. On 15 May 2023 she was appointed Minister of Solidarity and Housing in the government of Moetai Brotherson.
