= Hirohiti Tefaarere =

French Polynesian politician

Minister of small enterprise, industry and mining
- In office 19 September 2005 – 31 March 2006
- President: Oscar Temaru

President of the Assembly of French Polynesia
- In office 16 November 2004 – 14 April 2005
- Preceded by: Antony Géros
- Succeeded by: Antony Géros

Assembly Member for French Polynesia

Personal details
- Born: 19 June 1954
- Party: Union for Democracy; Aia Api

Hirohiti Tefaarere (born 19 June 1954) is a French Polynesian anti-nuclear activist, trade unionist, politician and former Cabinet Minister who served as President of the Assembly of French Polynesia from 2004 to 2005. He was a member of Aia Api and the Union for Democracy. In 2019 he was elected president of anti-nuclear organisation Mururoa e Tatou.

Tefaarere worked for the Direction centrale des renseignements généraux, a police intelligence agency, before becoming general secretary of the A Tia I Mua union. While still on the payroll of the French Interior Ministry he organised blockades in Papeete against the government of Gaston Flosse. In 1995 he led further riots against the resumption of French nuclear testing. He was arrested along with 15 members of his union, jailed, and tortured by French police. He was later president of the O Oe To Oe Rima union.

In late 2004, during the presidency of Oscar Temaru, he led a group of Union for Democracy MPs who challenged Temaru, delaying the budget and boycotting the Assembly in an effort to gain ministerial positions. Following the annulment of the 2004 election in the Windward isles in November 2004, Assembly President Antony Géros lost his seat, and Tefaarere was elected president of the Assembly. Géros was re-elected in the resulting by-election, and most Union for Democracy MPs supported him as their candidate for Speaker. Tefaarere ran against Géros, forcing the election into a second round of voting. Géros was successful in the second round, ousting Tefaarere as Assembly President. In September 2005 he was made Minister of small enterprise, industry and mining. He resigned from the post in March 2006. Temaru refused to acknowledge his resignation in an effort to keep his replacement, Lela Temauri, in the Assembly for an upcoming vote, but the delay was found to be unreasonable by the courts, and Tefaarere re-entered the Assembly.

He was re-elected in the 2008 election, and left the Aia Api party. Following the formation of Gaston Flosse's government, he was the To Tatou Aia candidate for Assembly President, but lost to Temaru, 27 votes to 28. In August 2008 he formed the A rohi party. He was subsequently made president of SETIL, the company in charge of French Polynesia's airports. He lost his seat in the 2013 election.

In January 2009 he was summoned for questioning for abuse of public funds as part of the OPT scandal. He subsequently accused the court of being politicised and corrupted by Freemasons. In January 2011 he was convicted of abuse of funds and fined US$22,000 and barred from office for two years. The conviction was overturned on appeal in June 2011. In August 2012 he was fined US$1000 for contempt of court for threatening a judge investigating his management of SETIL. In July 2015 he was convicted of attempted embezzlement of public funds while managing SETIL, and sentenced to three years imprisonment, with two suspended, and fined XPF1,000,000. The conviction was upheld on appeal in June 2016, but the sentence reduced to two years suspended.

In October 2019 he was elected president of anti-nuclear organisation Mururoa e Tatou.
