= Valentina Cross =

French Polynesian politician

Mayor of Teva I Uta
- In office 2008 – 31 March 2014
- Succeeded by: Tearii Alpha

Member of the French Polynesian Assembly for Windward Isles 2
- Incumbent
- Assumed office 29 January 2008
- In office 6 May 2001 – 22 May 2004

Personal details
- Born: 1964
- Party: Union For Democracy; Tavini Huiraatira

Valentina Hina Cross (born 1964) is a French Polynesian politician and Member of the Assembly of French Polynesia. From 2008 to 2014 she served as mayor of Teva I Uta. She is a member of Tavini Huiraatira. She is the daughter of former Assembly president Milou Ebb.

She was elected mayor of Teva I Uta in 2008. She lost the mayoralty in the 2014 municipal elections.

Cross first served in the Assembly of French Polynesia from 2001 to 2004. She was re-elected at the 2008 French Polynesian legislative election, and again on the Union For Democracy (UPLD) list at the 2013 election. In May 2016 she was charged with defamation by then-Vice president Nuihau Laurey over comments made during a debate about electricity supply. In October 2017 she was convicted and fined US$1000 and ordered to pay damages of US$1000 for alleging that Laurey showed favourtism towards power company EDT. The verdict was overturned on appeal in August 2020.

She was the Tavini candidate for French Polynesia's 2nd constituency in the 2017 French legislative election, but lost to Nicole Sanquer. In January 2018 she spoke out against a proposal from the French Polynesian government for The Seasteading Institute to establish an autonomous floating city in the Atimaono lagoon off Tahiti. Tourism Minister Jean-Christophe Bouissou denied that there had been any agreement. The government later admitted that it had signed an agreement, but that it had no legal effect and had expired.

Cross was re-elected as a Tavini candidate in the 2018 election.
