= Porinetia Ora =

Political party in French Polynesia

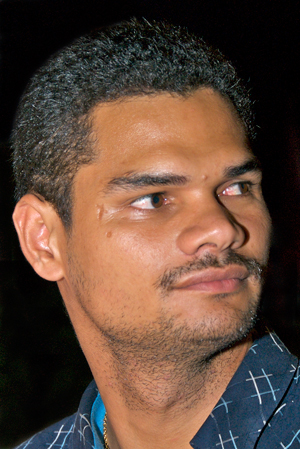
Teiva-Manutahi led the party from 2006 to 2015

Porinetia Ora ("Long live Polynesia!") was an autonomist political party in French Polynesia. The party was created on 1 December 2004 by former Tahoera'a Huiraatira Minister Reynald Temarii. He was replaced as party president in 2006 by Teiva Manutahi.

In 2005 the party opposed a proposal from French Polynesian President Oscar Temaru for a Pacific passport allowing free movement of people within the South Pacific. In May 2007 it proposed the creation of a customary senate. It opposed the re-listing of French Polynesia on the United Nations list of non-self-governing territories.

The party contested the 2005 by-election which resulted from the nullification of part of the results of the 2004 French Polynesian legislative election, but won no seats in the Assembly of French Polynesia. In the 2007 French legislative election it ran two candidates, Orama Manutahi and Teiva Manutahi.

In the 2013 elections the party won 5.7% of the vote in the first round. It subsequently endorsed the Tahoera'a in the second round.

The party was officially deregistered in January 2015 for failing to submit its annual accounts.
