= 2009 French Polynesian presidential election =

2009 French Polynesian presidential election may refer to:

- February 2009 French Polynesian presidential election
- November 2009 French Polynesian presidential election
