= Albert Solia =

French Polynesian politician

Minister of Equipment and Transport
- In office 18 November 2013 – 13 January 2017
- President: Gaston Flosse; Édouard Fritch
- Preceded by: Bruno Marty
- Succeeded by: Luc Faatau

Personal details
- Died: 11 March 2020
- Party: Tahoera'a Huiraatira

Albert Solia (died 11 March 2020) was a French Polynesian politician and Cabinet Minister.

Solia worked in the construction industry, and was a founder of construction company Interoute. From 1995 to 2007 he served as its chief executive. He later worked as a civil servant in French Polynesia's Ministry of Transport.

In November 2013 he was appointed Minister of Equipment, Planning, and Transport by Gaston Flosse, replacing Bruno Marty. Following the ousting from office of Flosse for corruption in September 2014 he retained his portfolios in the Cabinet of Édouard Fritch. In a cabinet reshuffle in January 2017 he was replaced by Luc Faatau. He later worked as an advisor to the president.

In October 2017 he was taken in for questioning and held for 40 hours over allegations of favourtism in awarding public works contracts.

He died in March 2020 after a long illness.
