= Jacqui Drollet =

French Polynesian politician (born 1944)

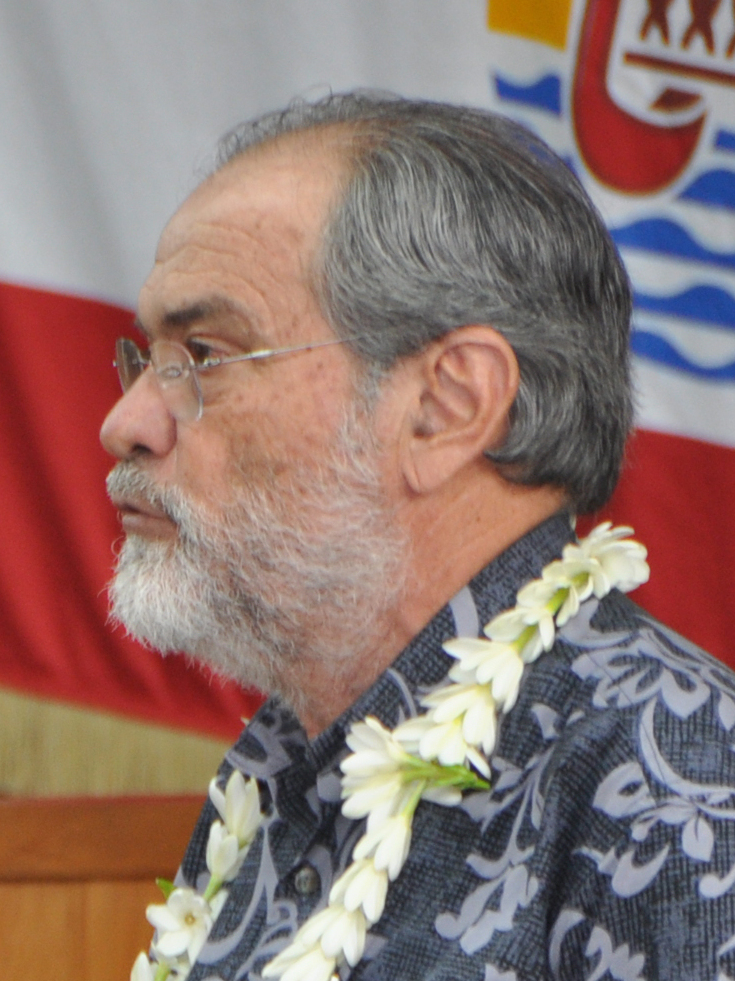
- Drollet in 2012

President of the Assembly of French Polynesia
- In office 14 April 2011 – 16 May 2013
- Preceded by: Oscar Temaru
- Succeeded by: Édouard Fritch

Vice-President of French Polynesia
- In office 3 March 2005 – 26 December 2006
- President: Oscar Temaru
- Preceded by: Édouard Fritch
- Succeeded by: Temauri Foster
- In office 14 June 2004 – 23 October 2004
- President: Oscar Temaru
- Preceded by: Édouard Fritch
- Succeeded by: Édouard Fritch

Minister of Health, Environment, and Scientific Research
- In office 10 December 1987 – 4 April 1991
- President: Alexandre Léontieff
- Preceded by: Lysis Lavigne
- Succeeded by: Michel Buillard (Health); Pierre Dehors (environment)

Member of the French Polynesian Assembly for Windward Isles
- In office 13 February 2005 – 16 May 2018
- In office 12 May 1996 – 5 May 2001
- In office 23 May 1982 – 17 March 1991

Personal details
- Born: 22 November 1944 (age 81) Papeete, French Polynesia
- Party: Ia Mana te Nunaa; Tavini Huiraatira

Jacqui Drollet (born 22 November 1944) is a French Polynesian politician, independence campaigner, and former Cabinet Minister. He was Minister of Health from 1987 to 1991, and President of the Assembly of French Polynesia from 14 April 2011 to 16 May 2013.

Drollet was educated as a marine biologist at the University of Toulouse. In 1975 he founded Ia Mana te Nunaa ("Power to the People"), a radical pro-independence party opposed to nuclear testing. He was first elected to the Assembly of French Polynesia in the 1982 French Polynesian legislative election, when Ia Mana won three seats. In August 1982 he ran in a by-election for Deputy to the French National Assembly, coming third. He was re-elected in 1986, and when Alexandre Léontieff became president in 1987, was appointed to Cabinet as Minister of Health, Environment, and Scientific Research. As Health Minister he organised a conference on the impact of French nuclear testing, and campaigned for the collection of cancer statistics so the health effects could be monitored. He lost his seat in the Assembly in the 1991 election.

He was re-elected to the Assembly on the Tavini Huiraatira list in the 1996 election, but lost his seat again in 2001. In June 2004 he was appointed vice-president in the government of Oscar Temaru. He was replaced as vice-president in October 2004 when Temaru lost a confidence vote to Gaston Flosse. He was reappointed as vice-president when Temaru regained power in March 2005. He surrendered the position as part of a coalition realignment in April 2006. He was later appointed telecommunications and culture minister in Temaru's 2007 government, and minister of tourism in Temaru's 2009 government.

While in opposition in 2010 he introduced and passed a bill in the Assembly limiting foreign investment in telecommunications in French Polynesia, effectively thwarting a plan by mobile phone company Digicel to enter the local market.

In April 2011 he was elected President of the Assembly. In February 2012 he was found to have publicly maligned two female opposition MPs and ordered to pay each of them US$2,000. In March 2013 he established a regional grouping of Polynesian parliaments. In July 2014 when President Gaston Flosse was convicted of corruption and banned from public office he wrote an open letter to French President François Hollande urging him to apply the law and dismiss Flosse from the Presidency.

He retired from politics in 2017.

In January 1997 he was appointed a commander of the Order of Tahiti Nui.

== Relatives ==
Drollet is the nephew of French Polynesian politician Jacques-Denis Drollet, and the cousin of Dag Drollet, who was killed by Christian Brando.
