= Teva Rohfritsch =

French Polynesian politician

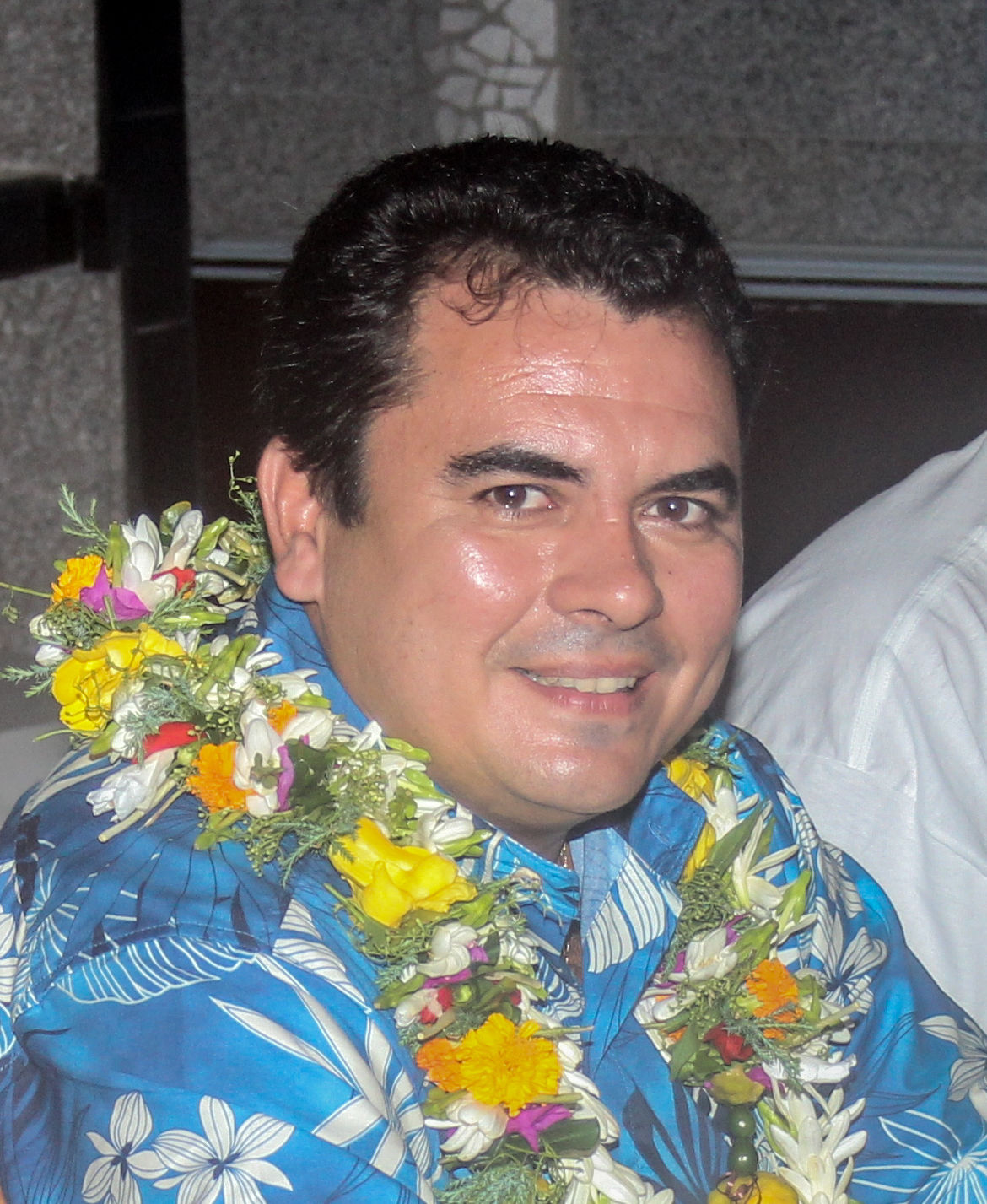
- Rohfritch in 2013

Senator for French Polynesia
- Incumbent
- Assumed office 27 September 2020
- Preceded by: Nuihau Laurey

Vice-President of French Polynesia
- In office 13 January 2017 – 2 September 2020
- President: Édouard Fritch
- Preceded by: Nuihau Laurey
- Succeeded by: Tearii Alpha

Economy, Finance, Major Works and Blue Economy
- Succeeded by: Yvonnick Raffin (Finance); Tearii Alpha (Blue Economy)

Member of the French Polynesian Assembly for Windward Isles
- In office 7 May 2013 – 30 April 2023
- In office 29 January 2008 – 2 May 2011
- Succeeded by: Rene Temeharo

Personal details
- Born: 3 February 1975 (age 51)
- Party: Tahoera'a Huiraatira; A Tia Porinetia; Tapura Huiraatira; Ia Ora te Nuna'a

Teva Rohfritsch (born 3 February 1975) is a French Polynesian politician and former Cabinet Minister. Since 2020 he has been one of French Polynesia's two senators in the French Senate, sitting with the Rally of Democrats, Progressives and Independents.

Rohfritsch is a former director of Socredo bank. He was first appointed to French Polynesia's Council of Ministers as tourism minister in November 2003. In 2005 he was economics minister. Following the 2008 French Polynesian legislative election he was appointed finance minister. In Oscar Temaru's 2009 administration he was appointed Minister of Maritime Resources. In April 2009 he was suspended from Tahoera'a Huiraatira after refusing to quit Temaru's government. He left the party two days later. In November 2009 he was made Minister of economic restructuring, foreign trade, industry and business in Gaston Tong Sang's cabinet. In March 2011 he was sacked from Tong Sang's government and subsequently announced his intention to leave politics and return to the private sector. His assembly seat was filled by René Temeharo.

In the leadup to the 2013 territorial elections he founded the A Tia Porinetia party. The party came third in the elections, winning 25 percent of the vote. Following the elections he was a candidate for president, but lost to Gaston Flosse.

In March 2014 he ran unsuccessfully for mayor of Tahiti.

In May 2015 he joined the government of Édouard Fritch as finance minister. In February 2016 he formally merged A Tia Porinetia with Fritch's new Tapura Huiraatira party, becoming deputy leader. In February 2017 he became finance minister again following the resignation of Nuihau Laurey to take up a role in the Senate. He was later appointed Vice-President of French Polynesia. Following the 2018 elections he retained his role as vice-president and economy minister.

In March 2020 he unsuccessfully ran for mayor of Punaauia. He subsequently offered to resign as vice-president, but his resignation was refused. In August 2020 he was nominated as one of Tapura's candidates for the French Senate. In September 2020 he resigned as vice-president and from Cabinet in order to campaign. He was elected to the Senate on 28 September 2020.

In September 2022 he joined Nicole Bouteau and Philip Schyle in resigning from Tapura Huiraatira, citing disappointment with Edouard Fritch's government. In December 2022 he and Bouteau founded the Ia Ora te Nuna'a party.
