= Teriipaia =

Teriipaia is a Polynesian surname. Notable people with the surname include:

- Mita Teriipaia, French Polynesian minister for culture and the arts
- Tarita Teriipaia (born 1941), French Polynesian actress, wife of Marlon Brando
