= Jean Millaud =

French Polynesian politician

President of the Assembly of French Polynesia
- In office 25 May 1972 – 5 October 1972
- Preceded by: John Teariki
- Succeeded by: Gaston Flosse
- In office 14 May 1970 – 13 May 1971
- Preceded by: John Teariki
- Succeeded by: John Teariki
- In office 17 May 1968 – 17 June 1969
- Preceded by: Jacques Tauraa
- Succeeded by: John Teariki
- In office 30 May 1949 – 20 October 1951
- Preceded by: Joseph Quesnot
- Succeeded by: Albert Leboucher

Member of the French Polynesian Assembly for Windward Islands
- In office 10 September 1967 – 10 September 1972

Member of the French Polynesian Assembly for West Tahiti
- In office 1946 – 18 January 1953

Personal details
- Born: 1906
- Died: 1991
- Party: E'a Api

Jean Millaud (1906–1991) was a French Polynesian politician who served as president of the Assembly of French Polynesia four times, first from 1949 to 1951, and then three more times between 1968 and 1972. He was a member of E'a Api. He was the uncle of politicians Daniel Millaud and Sylvain Millaud.

Millaud was a farmer and cattle breeder. He was first elected to the Representative Assembly (as it was then known) in the 1945–46 French Oceanian legislative election. He was elected president of the Assembly in 1949 following the death of his predecessor, Joseph Quesnot. As Assembly president he denounced corruption in the administration and opposed Chinese immigration to French Polynesia. In October 1951 he gave a speech during the budget debate denouncing Governor René Petitbon, accusing him of running a "ruinous Administration", denouncing his policies towards native courts and the Tahitian language, and calling for autonomy for French Polynesia. He resigned as president of the Assembly the next day, after the colonial administration refused to attend the Assembly so long as he held office. He lost his seat in the 1953 election.

In 1965 he became a founding member of the E'a Api party, and was elected its first president. He was re-elected to the Assembly in the 1967 election, which saw a pro-autonomy government take power. In early 1968 he was part of French Polynesia's delegation to France seeking autonomy. In May 1968 he was elected Assembly president, and served three terms in the next five years, alternating with John Teariki as part of a coalition deal. He lost his seat at the 1972 election.
