= Mita Teriipaia =

French Polynesian politician

Minister for Culture and the Arts

Member of the French Polynesian Assembly for Windward Islands
- Incumbent
- Assumed office November 2009
- President: Gaston Tong Sang

Personal details
- Party: To Tatou Ai’a

Mita Teriipaia is the French Polynesian minister for culture and the arts. He was appointed to his post in the government by President Gaston Tong Sang in November 2009.

Teriipaia is affiliated with the To Tatou Ai’a ("Our Home") group of anti-independence Polynesian political parties, and represents the Windward Islands electoral circumscription.
