= Justin Arapari =

French Polynesian politician (1947–2020)

President of the Assembly of French Polynesia
- In office 23 May 1996 – 17 May 2001
- Preceded by: Milou Ebb
- Succeeded by: Lucette Taero
- In office 17 March 1991 – 16 May 2001

Personal details
- Born: 26 September 1947 Mahaena, French Polynesia
- Died: 6 May 2020
- Party: Tahoera'a Huiraatira

Justin Mahai Arapari (26 September 1947 — 6 May 2020) was a French Polynesian politician. He served as president of the Assembly of French Polynesia from 1996 to 2001. He was a member of Tahoera'a Huiraatira.

Arapari was born in Mahaena and was educated at l'école centrale in Papeete. After working as a photography laboratory technician, he trained as a Protestant priest, graduating in 1972. He spent four years in Maharepa as a priest, before quitting to become a farmer and enter politics.

He contested the 1977 election as a candidate for Nedo Salmon's "New Polynesian Thought" list, but was unsuccessful. In 1981 he joined Taatiraa Porinetia. In February 1982 he joined Gaston Flosse's Tahoera'a Huiraatira, and four years later was its general secretary.

He was elected to the Assembly of French Polynesia at the 1991 election. He was re-elected at the 1996 election and elected President of the Assembly. Shortly after being elected he was convicted of misuse of corporate assets while a director of SETIL and given an eight-month suspended prison sentence. In 1999 he was indicted for illegal taking of interests while working for OPT. In 2001 he split with Flosse, attempting to form a breakaway Tahoera'a list and later founding the Manahune Party.

Following his departure from politics he was investigated for his involvement in the "phantom jobs scandal". He was convicted and sentenced to two years imprisonment. The conviction was upheld on appeal in 2012, and he was sentenced to two years imprisonment (suspended) and a five million XPF fine.
