= Joseph Quesnot =

French Polynesian politician

Senator for French Oceania
- In office 22 December 1946 – 31 March 1949
- Preceded by: None (position established)
- Succeeded by: Robert Lassalle-Séré

President of the Assembly of French Polynesia
- In office 11 March 1946 – 31 March 1949
- Preceded by: None (position established)
- Succeeded by: Jean Millaud
- Preceded by: 31 March 1949

Personal details
- Born: 25 September 1895 Béziers, France
- Died: 31 March 1949 At sea, on board the cargo liner Éridan

Joseph Quesnot (25 September 1895—31 March 1949) was a French politician who served as the first president of the Assembly of French Polynesia, and as a Senator.

Quesnot was born in Béziers and educated at the Lycée Vaucanson, though he did not complete his studies. He moved to Tahiti, where he worked as an accountant, and as director of an import-export company. He served as a municipal councillor in Papeete from 1933 to 1935, and as head of the chamber of commerce from 1933 to 1937. He was elected to the Assembly of French Polynesia in 1945, and elected its first president in March 1946. In December 1946 he was elected to the French Senate.

He died at sea of a heart attack aboard the cargo liner Eridan in 1949 while returning to France. A street in Papeete was later named after him.
