= A Tia Porinetia =

Political party in French Polynesia

A Tia Porinetia was a political party in French Polynesia. The party was founded in February 2013 by Teva Rohfritsch and members of To Tatou Aia and other small parties. The party was autonomist, and opposed the inclusion of French Polynesia on the United Nations list of non-self-governing territories.

The party initially consisted of 12 members of the Assembly of French Polynesia, but its numbers were quickly reduced by the departure of Bruno Sandras following a dispute over list rankings.

The party contested the 2013 French Polynesian legislative election, submitting a list of 73 candidates. The party won 25,453 votes in the first round (19.92% of the total). In the second round it gained the endorsements of the Rally for the Respect of the Polynesian Population and Te Ara Ti'a parties, winning 25% of the vote and 8 MPs. Following the election the party offered Rohfritsch as its candidate for president, losing to Gaston Flosse in a three-way vote. It did not offer a candidate for President of the Assembly, and all the party's MP's abstained.

In June 2013, the party supported an Assembly resolution calling for a formal referendum on independence from France. In October 2013 it opposed the opening of a mosque in Papeete.

Following the conviction of Gaston Flosse for corruption the party began to work more closely with the government of Édouard Fritch. It did not run candidates in the 2015 election to the French Senate, instead endorsing the government candidates. In May 2015 Rohfritsch joined the government as Minister of Economic Recovery, Blue Economy and Digital. In September 2015 A Tia Porinetia and Tapura Huiraatira MP's decided to unite to support Fritch.

The party formally merged with Tapura Huiraatira in February 2016.

== See also ==
- List of political parties in French Polynesia
