= Eliane Tevahitua =

French Polynesian politician

Vice-President of French Polynesia
- In office 15 May 2023 – 3 June 2024
- President: Moetai Brotherson
- Preceded by: Jean-Christophe Bouissou

Minister of Culture and the Environment
- Incumbent
- Assumed office 15 May 2023
- Preceded by: Heremoana Maamaatuaiahutapu

Member of the French Polynesian Assembly for Windward Isles 3
- In office 5 May 2013 – 30 April 2023

Personal details
- Born: 23 July 1958 (age 67) Papeete, French Polynesia
- Party: Union For Democracy; Tavini Huiraatira

Eliane Tevahitua (born 23 July 1958) is a French Polynesian politician and Cabinet Minister who was Vice-President of French Polynesia from 2023 to 2024. She is a member of Tavini Huiraatira.

Tevahitua was born in Papeete and worked as a midwife. From 1994 to 2013 she was director of the School of Midwives. In 2008 she graduated from the University of French Polynesia with a doctorate in Polynesian civilisation. Her thesis was on the toponymy of the lands of Fa 'a'ä and Tahitian land representations. She then worked as secretary of the Union of French-speaking women of Oceania (UFFO).

She was elected to the Assembly of French Polynesia on the Union For Democracy (UPLD) list at the 2013 French Polynesian legislative election. In the Assembly she served on the Permanent Commission, and the Budget and Finance Committee. She was an advocate for nuclear-test victims, forcing the government to disclose more information on the health toll of French fallout. She was re-elected at the 2018 election as a Tavini candidate. In 2020 she opposed French immigration to Polynesia, calling it colonialist. During the COVID-19 pandemic she denounced the government response as inadequate, and called for the introduction of mass-testing to protect the population. She later urged the use of Chinese or Russian vaccines rather than waiting for France to supply them.

She was not included in Tavini's final list for the 2023 election. Following the Tāvini's election win she was appointed Vice-President and Minister of Culture and the Environment in Moetai Brotherson's new cabinet.
