= Armelle Merceron =

French Polynesian politician

Armelle Merceron is a former government minister from French Polynesia.

== Biography ==
Merceron was an economics teacher for nearly 20 years, including two years at La Mennais College and 17 years at the Lycée Professionnel de Taaone. In 1996 she entered politics. In 1998 she was appointed Minister of Social Affairs. In September 2001 following the sacking of Patrick Howell she was appointed Minister of Health and the Civil Service by President Gaston Flosse. As Health Minister she dealt with a doctor's strike, and proposed that all pregnant women be tested for HIV to contain the virus. She later became Minister of Education. In January 2007 she was appointed Minister of Finance by Gaston Tong Sang. She was reappointed as a Minister by Tong Sang in 2008.

In October 2009 she was accused of favouritism in the awarding of government contracts. In December 2009 she was convicted and fined US$25,000 for skewing the awarding of more than US$1 million worth of contracts. In 2017 she announced her retirement from politics.
