= Jordy Chan =

French Polynesian politician

Minister of Equipment and Land Transport
- Incumbent
- Assumed office 15 May 2023
- President: Moetai Brotherson
- Preceded by: René Temeharo

Personal details
- Born: 1993 or 1994 (age 32–33)

Jordy Chan (born 1993 or 1994) is a French Polynesian politician and Cabinet Minister who serves in the government of Moetai Brotherson.

Chan was born in French Polynesia and was educated at Lycée Saint-Louis and École des ponts ParisTech in France. He worked for the United Nations Office for Project Services in Haiti, and then for the World Bank, before becoming deputy director of the port of Papeete.

On 15 May 2023 he was appointed Minister of Equipment and Land Transport in the government of Moetai Brotherson. He is the youngest Minister in the government.
