= Albert Leboucher =

President of the Representative Assembly
- In office 20 October 1951 – 14 March 1953
- Preceded by: Jean Millaud
- Succeeded by: Jean-Baptiste Céran-Jérusalémy

Personal details
- Born: 8 July 1888 Papeete, Tahiti
- Died: 29 November 1954 (aged 66)

Charles Albert Leboucher (8 July 1888 – 29 November 1954) was a Tahitian businessman and politician.

== Biography ==
Leboucher was born in Papeete on 8 July 1888. His father had arrived in Tahiti from France in 1865 and established a furniture and carpentry business. Leboucher was a successful businessman, taking over his father's company and becoming a ship owner and President of the Chamber of Commerce. He was also well known for his acupuncture and homeopathy practice.

Leboucher was elected to Papeete municipal council and the Representative Assembly, representing the constituency of Papeete. He was elected First Vice President of the Assembly in 1950, and the following year he became president, a post he held until it was converted into a Territorial Assembly in 1953. In 1951 he received the Legion of Honour.

He died due to heart problems in November 1954. Following his death, his son Georges won the by-election for the vacant seat on the Territorial Assembly.
