= February 2009 French Polynesian presidential election =

Presidential election in French Polynesia

An indirect presidential election was held in French Polynesia on 11 February 2009, after defections from the ruling pro-autonomy faction and a scheduled constructive vote of no confidence planned for 12 February 2009 caused the incumbent Gaston Tong Sang to step down on 7 February 2009.

This presidential election was the third in less than a year since the 2008 general election, which had been called by France to promote political stability. There were seven changes of government in French Polynesia since the 2004 general election.

The President was chosen by members of the Assembly.

== Election background ==
Six of the members of President Gaston Tong Sang's governing coalition had quit in the months proceeding the 2009 presidential election, leaving his government open to potential challengers. In January 2009, Tong Sang had opened negotiations with Oscar Temaru to try to create a union government and set the stage for new elections. The negotiations failed to produce any tangible results, and were deemed as a failure.

President Tong Sang announced on 7 February 2009, that he would step down ahead of a proposed censure motion against his government by a coalition of pro-separatist parties led by Temaru. Tong Sang's resignation, which he described as "immediate" was widely expected in the French Polynesian media, which characterized the move as a "strategy of resignation".

The censure motion proposal against the Tong Sang government was supported by the Union for Democracy (UPLD), Tahoera'a Huiraatira, and Rautahi political parties. Together these parties put Temaru forward as their candidate for president as part of the no confidence measure. Supporters of the censure motion claimed that they could guarantee the support of 31 of the 57 members in the Assembly.

Following his announcement of his intent to resign, Tong Sang immediately left Tahiti for Bora Bora, where he also serves as the mayor.

Temaru, who also served as the President of the Assembly at the time, accepted Tong Sang's resignation, paving the way for a new presidential election.

== Election ==
Oscar Temaru appeared likely to be elected President, but shortly before the election, there were reports that the accord between Temaru, Gaston Flosse and Jean Christophe Bouissou had broken up again, calling into question Temaru's chances.

Four candidates were nominated:

- Oscar Temaru, by Tavini Huiraatira and the Union for Democracy
- Gaston Tong Sang, by O Porinetia To Tatou Ai'a
- Edouard Fritch, by Tahoera'a Huiraatira
- Sandra Levy Agami, formerly a member of Tong Sang's alliance

=== First round ===
In the first round of voting in the morning, Temaru received 24 votes, Tong Sang 20, Fritch 12 and Levy Agami one. The first round thus proved inconclusive, leading to a second round in the afternoon.

=== Second round ===
The second round of the election was held later on the afternoon of February 11, 2009. Temaru and Tong Sang advanced from the morning's first round. The Assembly elected Oscar Temaru as the next President during the second round. Temaru won 37 votes in the Assembly, which was 17 more votes than outgoing former President Tong Sang's 20. Temaru was elected thanks to support from the Tahoera'a Huiraatira party. The Tahoera'a Huiraatira candidate, Edouard Fritch, was defeated in the first round, and later support to Temaru. Temaru became President of French Polynesia for the fourth time in less than five years.

The coalition which allowed Temaru to return to power consisted of Temaru's Union for Democracy, Flosse's and Fritch's Tahoeraa Huiraatira and Bouissou's Rautahi party.

In his nomination speech to the Assembly, Temaru described the current tourism situation in French Polynesia as "catastrophic". Temaru noted that hotel occupancy rates in Bora Bora and Moorea are currently less than 20% on certain days due to the world financial crisis. He explained that the huge drop in foreign visitors may cause the government to cut the work hours of government employees, lay off workers or close state-owned hotels.

=== Results ===
French Polynesian presidential election, 2009
Party	Candidate	First round		Second round	
Party	Candidate	Votes	Percentage	Votes	Percentage
Tavini Huiraatira	Oscar Temaru	24	42.11%	37	64.91%
O Porinetia To Tatou Ai'a	Gaston Tong Sang	20	35.09%	20	35.09%
Tahoera'a Huiraatira	Edouard Fritch	12	21.05%		
Independent	Sandra Levy Agami	1	1.75%		
Totals		57	100.00%	57	100.00%
