= Vice-President of French Polynesia =

Vice-President of French Polynesia (French: Vice-présidente de la Polynésie française; Tahitian: Mono-Peretiteni no te Porinetia farani) is a senior governmental position in French Polynesia. The office holder is appointed by the President of French Polynesia. Before the establishment of executive presidential office, in 1977 the office of vice president of the government council was established. The officeholders were Francis Sanford (June 1977 – June 1982) and Gaston Flosse (June 1982 – September 1984).

== Vice Presidents ==
Name	Took office	Left office	President	Notes
Alexandre Léontieff	14 September 1984	15 April 1986	Gaston Flosse	
Patrick Peaucellier	15 April 1986	12 February 1987	Gaston Flosse	
Jacques Teheiura	12 February 1987	9 December 1987	Jacques Teuira	
Georges Kelly	12 February 1987	4 April 1991	Alexandre Léontieff	
Michel Buillard	12 September 1991	30 May 1995	Gaston Flosse	
Édouard Fritch	30 May 1995	14 June 2004	Gaston Flosse	
Jacqui Drollet	14 June 2004	23 October 2004	Oscar Temaru	
Édouard Fritch	23 October 2004	3 March 2005	Gaston Flosse	
Jacqui Drollet	3 March 2005	26 December 2006	Oscar Temaru	
Temauri Foster	26 December 2006	13 September 2007	Gaston Tong Sang	
Antony Géros	13 September 2007	23 February 2008	Oscar Temaru	
Édouard Fritch	23 February 2008	15 April 2008	Gaston Flosse	
Jules Ienfa	19 April 2008	12 February 2009	Gaston Tong Sang	
Antony Géros	12 February 2009	25 November 2009	Oscar Temaru	
Édouard Fritch	25 November 2009	1 March 2011	Gaston Tong Sang	
Tearii Alpha	1 March 2011	1 April 2011	Gaston Tong Sang	
Antony Géros	1 April 2011	17 May 2013	Oscar Temaru	
Nuihau Laurey	17 May 2013	13 January 2017	Gaston Flosse, Nuihau Laurey, Édouard Fritch	
Teva Rohfritsch	13 January 2017	2 September 2020	Édouard Fritch	
Tearii Alpha	17 September 2020	4 November 2021	Édouard Fritch	
Jean-Christophe Bouissou	10 November 2021	12 May 2023	Édouard Fritch	
Eliane Tevahitua	15 May 2023	3 June 2024	Moetai Brotherson	
Chantal Galenon	3 June 2024	Incumbent	Moetai Brotherson	

== See also ==
- Politics of French Polynesia
- President of French Polynesia
