= Teva I Uta =

Commune in French Polynesia, France

- Commune
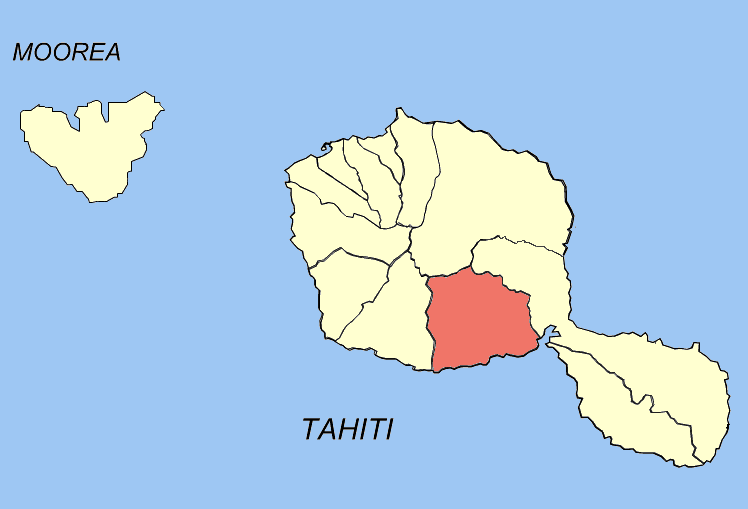
- Location of the commune (in red) within the Windward Islands
- Location of Teva I Uta
- Coordinates: 17°44′S 149°25′W
- Country: France
- Overseas collectivity: French Polynesia
- Subdivision: Windward Islands

Government
  - Mayor (2020–2026): Tearii Alpha
- Area^{1}: 119.5 km^{2} (46.1 sq mi)
- Highest elevation: 1,193 m (3,914 ft)
- Lowest elevation: 0 m (0 ft)
- Population (2022): 10,837
  - Density: 90.69/km^{2} (234.9/sq mi)
- Time zone: UTC−10:00
- INSEE/Postal code: 98752 /98726
- ^{1} French Land Register data, which excludes lakes, ponds, glaciers > 1 km^{2} (0.386 sq mi or 247 acres) and river estuaries.

Teva I Uta is a commune of French Polynesia, an overseas territory of France in the Pacific Ocean. The commune of Teva I Uta is located on the island of Tahiti, in the administrative subdivision of the Windward Islands, themselves part of the Society Islands. At the 2022 census it had a population of 10,837.

Teva I Uta consists of the following associated communes:

- Mataiea
- Papeari

The administrative centre of the commune is the settlement of Mataiea.
