= Béatrice Vernaudon =

French politician

Béatrice Vernaudon (born 27 October 1953, Papeete, Tahiti, French Polynesia) is a French Politician. Béatrice Vernaudon-Coppenrath is a Knight of the Legion of Honor.

== Life ==
She was elected a deputy to the National Assembly of France on 16 June 2002, becoming one of the Deputies of the 12th French National Assembly (2002–2007), in the second district of French Polynesia. She was part of the French political party Union for a Popular Movement (UMP).

== Offices held ==
- 10 April 2000 to 18 March 2001: member of the Municipal council of Pirae (Tahiti, French Polynesia)
- 7 May 2001 to 18 June 2002: member of the Assembly of French Polynesia
- 18 March 2001 to 17 December 2004: Associate to the Mayor of Pirae (Tahiti, French Polynesia)
- 18 June 2002 to June 2007: Deputy of French Polynesia to the National Assembly of France
