= Tearii Alpha =

French Polynesian politician

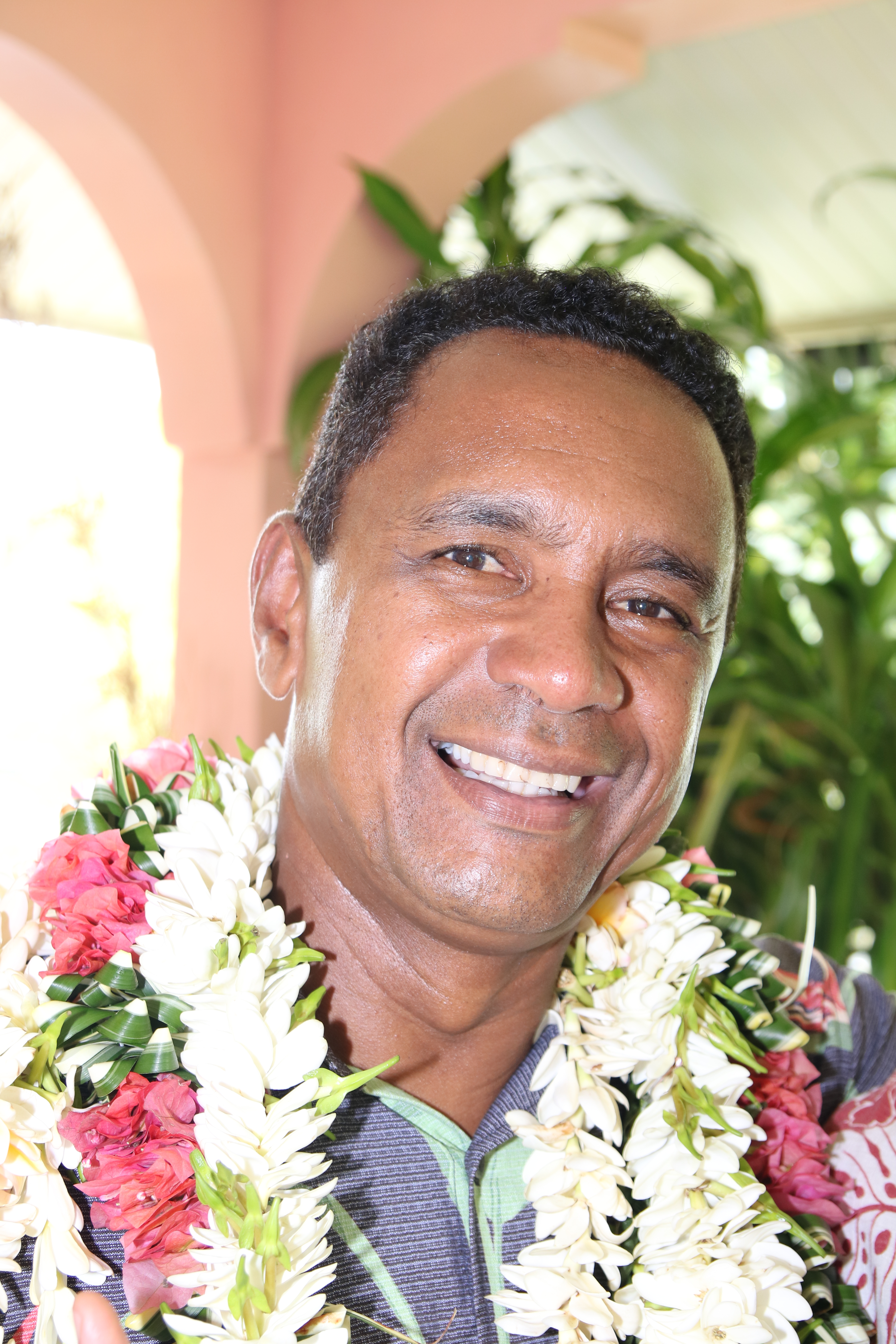
- Alpha in 2019

Vice-President of French Polynesia
- In office 17 September 2020 – 4 November 2021
- President: Édouard Fritch
- Preceded by: Teva Rohfritsch
- Succeeded by: Jean-Christophe Bouissou
- In office 1 March 2011 – 1 April 2011
- President: Gaston Tong Sang
- Preceded by: Édouard Fritch
- Succeeded by: Antony Géros

Minister of Agriculture, Blue Economy and Industry
- In office 17 September 2020 – 15 May 2023
- President: Édouard Fritch
- Preceded by: Teva Rohfritsch (Blue Economy)
- Succeeded by: Taivini Teai

Personal details
- Born: 5 December 1971 (age 54)
- Party: Tapura Huiraatira; To Tatou Aia

Tearii Te Moana Alpha (born 5 December 1971) is a French Polynesian politician. Since 2014 he has served as Mayor of Teva I Uta. He was Vice-President of French Polynesia briefly in 2011, and again from 2020-2021. He is a founding member of Tahoeraa Huiraatira.

In 1997 Alpha completed a thesis in biological sciences at the French Pacific University.

In October 2004 he was appointed Minister of Fisheries in the government of Gaston Flosse. In December of that year he was appointed as head of Tahoeraa Huiraatira's youth wing. He later served as Minister of Lands.

On 2 March 2011 he was appointed as Vice President by Gaston Tong Sang, replacing Édouard Fritch. He ran for the French National Assembly as a candidate for To Tatou Aia in the 2012 election.

In march 2014 he was elected mayor of Teva I Uta, defeating Valentina Cross.

In April 2018, in the leadup to the 2018 elections, he was accused with other Tapura Huiraatira members of using public money to fund his election campaign. In September 2020 he was appointed vice-president following the resignation of Teva Rohfritsch.

On 14 February 2021 he was elected as president of the community of municipalities of Tereheamanu.

In August 2021 a wedding ceremony for Alpha reportedly violated Covid-19 rules. In November 2021 he was fired as Vice-President after refusing to comply with the territory's mandatory vaccination law. However, he retained his ministerial portfolios, a decision which led to the resignation from Cabinet of Nicole Bouteau. He was replaced as Vice-President by Jean-Christophe Bouissou.
