= Lucette Taero =

French Polynesian politician

Lucette Taero is a politician from French Polynesia. After serving as minister under President Gaston Flosse, in 2001 she became the first woman to become the assembly president in French Polynesia.

== Career ==
Taero served as a government minister under President Gaston Flosse for five years. She served as a Minister of Employment and Professional Training, where she was responsible for "social dialogue and women's affairs." Taero and Flosse are members (and Flosse the founder) of the ʻĀmuitahiraʻa o te Nūnaʻa Māʻohi party, also known as the Tahoeraa Huiraatira Party, which is conservative and pro-independence (from France).

On May 17, 2001, she became the president of the Assembly of French Polynesia – a role also referred to as the Speaker of the Assembly – when the assembly voted to elect her. She was the first woman to hold the position, and as of 2023, she remains the only woman to hold the position.

In February 2004, Taero was involved in a physical altercation with opposition councillor Loïc Brigato during an Assembly session. After Brigato insulted her, Taero handed the chair over to the vice-president, approached Brigato, slapped him twice and punched him.

In 2008, Taero resigned from the Tahoeraa Huiraatira Party a few days before the beginning of the next general election. According to a political review in the journal Polynesia in Review, she was not very popular as the leader of the assembly, and did not choose to pursue a further political career after she left office.
