= Philip Schyle =

French Polynesian politician

Philip Schyle (born 15 September 1962 Nouméa, New Caledonia) is a French Polynesian politician and a member of the O Porinetia To Tatou Ai'a political party. He is also president of the Fetia Api political party. Schyle was twice the President of the Assembly of French Polynesia - from April 2006 to April 2007 and from April 2009 to April 2010.

In 2003 Schyle was elected mayor of Arue, French Polynesia in a by-election, following the disappearance of the previous mayor, Boris Léontieff.

He was elected Speaker (President) of the French Polynesia Assembly in April 2006. He was again elected president on Thursday, April 9, 2009. He defeated incumbent Speaker Edouard Fritch. Schyle received 40 votes, while Fritch garnered just 14 votes in the election. There were two blank ballots and one member did not participate in the election. Schyle was immediately sworn in as Speaker following his victory.

In June 2020 he lost the mayoralty of Arue to Teura Iriti in the second round of municipal elections.

In September 2022 he joined Teva Rohfritsch and Nicole Bouteau in resigning from Tapura Huiraatira, citing disappointment with Edouard Fritch's government. He subsequently decided to retire from political life.
