= Marcel Tuihani =

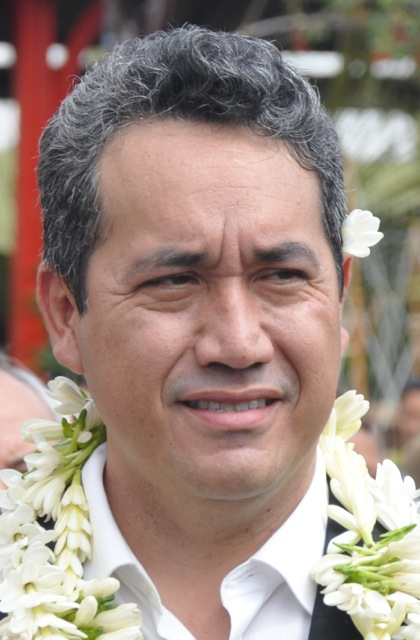
- Tuihani in 2014

President of the Assembly of French Polynesia
- In office 16 September 2014 – 17 May 2018
- Preceded by: Édouard Fritch
- Succeeded by: Gaston Tong Sang

Personal details
- Born: November 24, 1971 (age 53); Papeete, French Polynesia
- Political party: Tahoera'a Huiraatira

Marcel Tuihani (born 24 November 1971) is a French politician who served as President of the Assembly of French Polynesia from 2014 to 2018, as a member of Tahoera'a Huiraatira.

== Early life ==
Marcel Tuihani was born in Papeete, French Polynesia, on 24 November 1971, to Marcel Tuihani Sr. He was educated at Lycée Paul-Gauguin and Pomare IV College.

Tuihani worked at the Post and Telecommunications Office's technical department, but left to continue his education. He graduated from Ecole nouvel d'ingénieur en communication – Télécom Lille 1 with an engineering degree in 2003. He became a president at the Office of Posts and Telecommunications and worked there for eighteen years.

== Career ==
In 2008, Tuihani was a technical advisor to the President of French Polynesia. In 2010, he became the chief of staff for the Minister of Solidarity. He was Director General of the Polynesian Housing Office from May 2010 to June 2011.

Tuihani was elected secretary general of Tāpura Huiraʻatira in 2011, and president in 2015. In 2013, he was appointed Minister of Housing, Land Affairs, the Digital Economy and Crafts. He was elected to the municipal council of Pāʻea in 2014.

Édouard Fritch, President of the Assembly of French Polynesia, was elected President of French Polynesia. Tuihani was elected to succeed him as president of the assembly on 15 September 2014. Charges were brought against Tuihani in connection to the corruption case involving Gaston Flosse, but these were later dropped in 2015.

== Personal life ==
Tuihani is the father of two children.

== Works cited ==
=== News ===
- "French Polynesia assembly president exonerated". Radio New Zealand. 16 June 2015. Archived from the original on 2 July 2025.
- "Marcel Tuihani, une ascension fulgurante". Tahiti Nui Television. 15 September 2014. Archived from the original on 5 March 2016.

=== Web ===
- "The President of the Assembly". President of the Assembly of French Polynesia. Archived from the original on 9 October 2017.
