= Michel Buillard =

French Polynesian politician

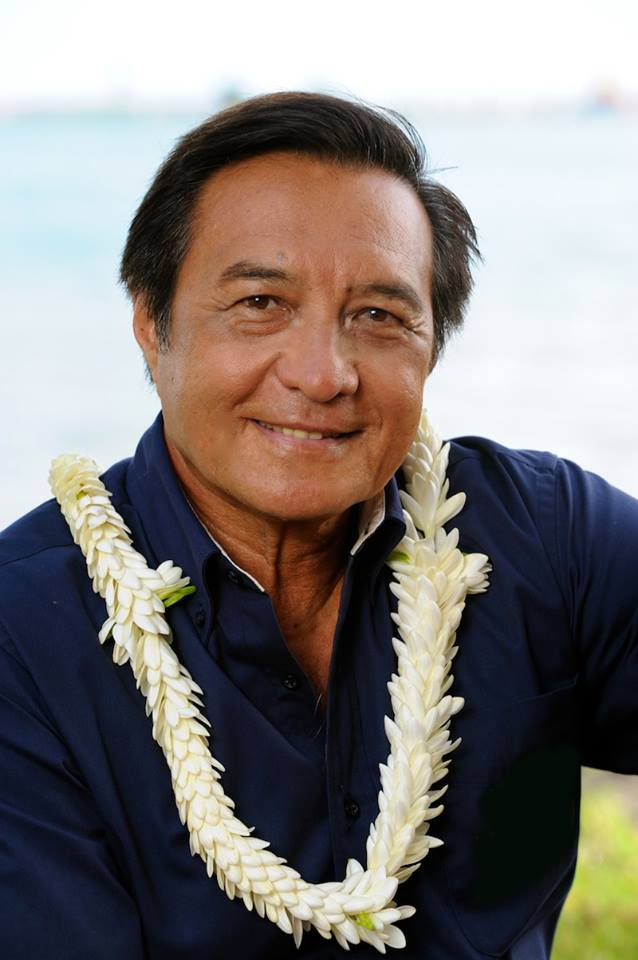

Mayor of Papeete
- In office 24 June 1995 – 28 March 2026
- Preceded by: Louise Carlson
- Succeeded by: Rémy Brillant

Vice-President of French Polynesia
- In office September 1991 – May 1995
- President: Gaston Flosse
- Preceded by: Georges Kelly
- Succeeded by: Édouard Fritch

Minister of Youth, Social Integration, Sports and Urban Policy
- In office 1996–1997

Minister of Health
- In office 1991–1996

Minister of Labour, Employment, Vocational Training and Housing
- In office 1984–1987

Member of the French Polynesian Assembly for Windward Isles
- Incumbent
- Assumed office 5 May 2013

Member of the French National Assembly for French Polynesia's 1st constituency
- In office 12 June 1997 – 16 June 2012
- Preceded by: Jean Juventin
- Succeeded by: Édouard Fritch

Personal details
- Born: 9 September 1950 (age 76) Papeete, French Polynesia, France
- Party: Tahoera'a Huiraatira; Union for a Popular Movement; Tapura Huiraatira

Michel Buillard (born 9 September 1950) is a French Polynesian politician and former Cabinet Minister. Mayor of Papeete (1995-2026). He was deputy of the National Assembly of France for French Polynesia's 1st constituency from 1997 to 2012. In the National Assembly, he was a member of the Union for a Popular Movement. In the Assembly of French Polynesia, he is a member of Tapura Huiraatira.

== Biography ==
After attending school at the Brothers' School in Ploërmel where he obtained his baccalaureate degree in 1969, he began his professional career at the bottom of the scale at the Socrédo bank, then went on to hold administrative posts before returning to school and obtaining a degree in law from the University of Bordeaux in 1979.

In 1983, he was appointed Director of the Territorial Office for Health and Social Action (OTASS). That same year saw his entry into politics in the Tahoeraa Huiraatira and his election to the municipal council of Pirae in the team of Gaston Flosse.

In 1984, French Polynesia gained internal autonomy. First Polynesian president, Gaston Flosse named him a member of the government of French Polynesia by assigning a large ministry in charge of Labor, Employment, Vocational Training and Housing. After the territorial elections of 1986, he took the portfolio of Youth, Sports and Housing.

In December 1987, following a reversal of the majority, Michel Buillard returned to the Assembly of French Polynesia, where he sat as an advisor in the opposition Tahoeraa Huiraatira ranks.

In 1989, he founded the association Ia Ora Papeete, at the head of which he was fighting for the first time the mayor of Papeete. He fails, but at 38, he gets a very honorable score of 21.5% against an outgoing mayor, Jean Juventin, then at the height of its popularity.

After the territorial elections of March 1991, the Tahoeraa Huiraatira returned to power. Gaston Flosse appointed him vice-president and awarded him the Ministry of Health, Solidarity, Housing and Research.

On 24 June 1995 he was elected mayor of Papeete after the victory of his list Ia Ora Papeete in the second round against the outgoing mayor Louise Carlson.

In June 1997, he was elected to the French National Assembly and left the government. He was re-elected in 2002 and again in 2007. He did not run again in 2012.

He was re-elected mayor of Papeete in 2001, 2008, 2014, 2020 but he is defeated by Rémy Brillant in 2026.

In 2006 he was convicted of misusing public funds, alongside other members of the Tahoeraa Huiraatira party. In April 2017 he and the other defendants were ordered to jointly repay US$2.1 million. In October 2011 he was convicted in the "phantom jobs" scandal, and barred from public office for three years.

In February 2008, just before the second round of voting in the 2008 French Polynesian legislative election, he quit as a member of Tahoeraa Huiraatira.

In May 2013, he was elected representative to the French Polynesia Assembly on the Tahoeraa Huiraatira list, then chair of the Committee on Institutions, International and European Affairs, Solidarity, Employment and Relations with the Commons. In April 2015 he was expelled from the party.

In September 2013, he published Tamarii Tahiti, a collection of memories of childhood and youth (Mahana - Les Éditions du Soleil - Tahiti).

In November 2021 he suffered a fall and was hospitalised while on vacation in Nice. He returned to French Polynesia in June 2022.

He was re-elected to the Assembly in the 2023 election.
