= Jean-Christophe Bouissou =

French Polynesian politician

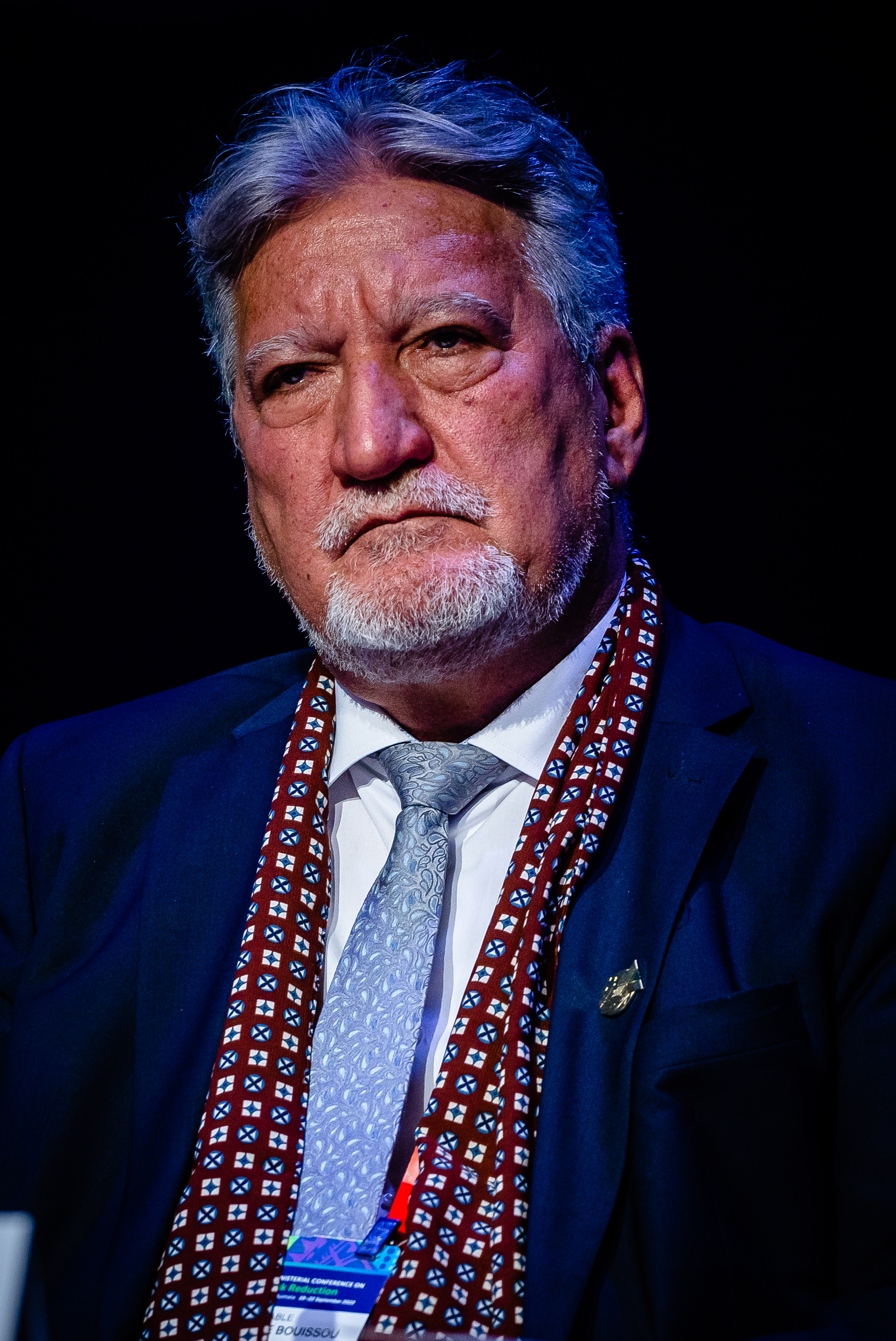
- Bouissou in 2022

Vice-President of French Polynesia
- In office 15 November 2021 – 15 May 2023
- President: Édouard Fritch
- Preceded by: Tearii Alpha
- Succeeded by: Eliane Tevahitua

Personal details
- Born: 28 October 1960 (age 66)
- Party: Tāpura Huiraʻatira

Jean-Christophe Matahuira Bouissou (born 28 October 1960) is a French Polynesian politician and leader of the Rautahi political party. He was Vice-President of French Polynesia from 2021 to 2023.

== Education and early career ==
Bouissou was born on 28 October in Faʻaʻā in French Polynesia. After briefly studying at a notarial school in Paris, France, from 1980 to 1981, before he went to the United States. He received his degree in computer science and mathematics from Graceland University in 1984.

He was then head of the IT Department, and later financial, from 1985 to 1986 for the Autonomous Port of Papeete. From 1990 to 1991, he was then Deputy Administrative Director of the port, before from 1991 to 1995 becoming Deputy Director of Finance and Operations of the port. Afterward, he was a technical advisor to the government before he became minister. His political career began shortly afterward and in 1998 he became Minister of Housing. He went on to become a Labour minister in 2000.

== Crises and aftermaths ==
From 26 October 2004 to 16 February 2005 he was spokesman of the Flosse government, right after the fall of Oscar Temaru’s government due to a motion of censure on 9 October 2004. At that time he also served as Interior Minister and the period has been referred to as one of turmoil. In September 2005 he launched a new pro-autonomy party, the Rautahi party. Although he had been in Flosse's government, by 2010 the two expressed criticisms of each other and had become political rivals.

In October 2007 he was fined for corruption, after favouring his half-brother in social-housing allocation in 2002 while housing minister. In 2013 he was charged with corruption again over his links to New Caledonian businessman Bill Ravel.

In September 2014 he joined the government of Edouard Fritch.

In November 2021 he was appointed vice-president, replacing Tearii Alpha.

In July 2023 he was charged with illegal taking of interests for allegedly using his ministerial position to promote the Ecoparc tourism project in exchange for money.
