= O Porinetia To Tatou Ai'a =

‘O Pōrīnetia To Tātou ‘Ai‘a ("Polynesia, a Homeland for us all") was a French Polynesian anti-independence political party founded by Gaston Tong Sang on 1 October 2007 after he split from his former party, the Tāhō‘ēra‘a Huira‘atira. It had six members in the French Polynesian assembly, all former Taheora'a Huiraatira members.

It presented a joint list called "To Tātou ‘Ai‘a" (Homeland for us all) together with other autonomist parties in the January 2008 elections.

The party merged with others to form A Tia Porinetia ahead of the 2013 elections.

== Notable people ==
- Mita Teriipaia, French Polynesian minister for culture and the arts
