= Édouard Fritch =

Former President of French Polynesia (2014–2023)

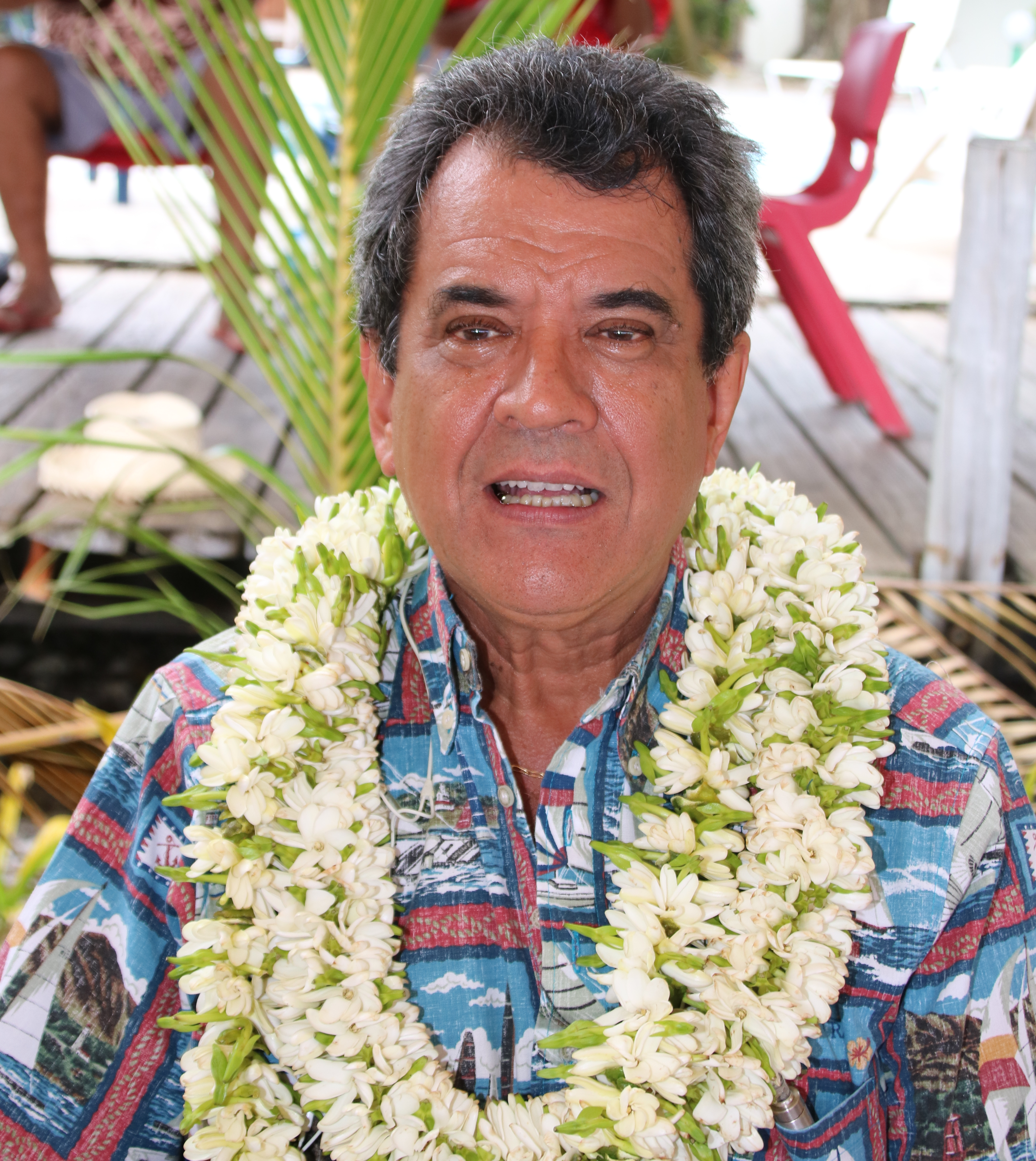
- Fritch in 2017

16th and 17th President of French Polynesia
- In office 12 September 2014 – 12 May 2023
- Vice President: Nuihau Laurey; Teva Rohfritsch; Tearii Alpha; Jean-Christophe Bouissou
- Preceded by: Gaston Flosse
- Succeeded by: Moetai Brotherson

President of Tapura Huiraatira
- Incumbent
- Assumed office 20 February 2016
- Preceded by: Office established

Vice President of French Polynesia
- In office 25 November 2009 – 1 March 2011
- President: Gaston Flosse
- Preceded by: Antony Géros
- Succeeded by: Tearii Alpha
- In office 23 February 2008 – 15 April 2008
- President: Gaston Flosse
- Preceded by: Antony Géros
- Succeeded by: Jules Ienfa
- In office 23 October 2004 – 3 March 2005
- President: Gaston Flosse
- Preceded by: Jacqui Drollet
- Succeeded by: Jacqui Drollet
- In office 30 May 1996 – 14 June 2004
- President: Gaston Flosse
- Preceded by: Michel Buillard
- Succeeded by: Jacqui Drollet

Member of the National Assembly for French Polynesia's 1st constituency
- In office 20 June 2012 – 23 April 2014
- Preceded by: Michel Buillard
- Succeeded by: Maina Sage

President of the Assembly of French Polynesia
- In office 16 May 2013 – 12 September 2014
- Preceded by: Jacqui Drollet
- Succeeded by: Marcel Tuihani
- In office 12 February 2009 – 9 April 2009
- Preceded by: Oscar Temaru
- Succeeded by: Philip Schyle
- In office 12 April 2007 – 29 February 2008
- Preceded by: Philip Schyle
- Succeeded by: Oscar Temaru

Mayor of Pirae
- Incumbent
- Assumed office 28 March 2014
- Preceded by: Béatrice Vernaudon
- In office 10 May 2000 – 16 March 2008
- Preceded by: Gaston Flosse
- Succeeded by: Béatrice Vernaudon

Personal details
- Born: 1 April 1952 (age 74) Papeete, French Polynesia
- Party: Tahoera'a Huiraatira (1984–2015); Tapura Huiraatira (2016–present)
- Spouses: Joan Flosse (divorced); Angeline Lehartel
- Children: Marc Manuarii Fritch; Pamela Fritch; Joan Fritch
- Education: École des ingénieurs de la ville de Paris
- Profession: Engineer

Winfred Édouard Tereori Fritch (French pronunciation: [edwaʁ fʁitʃ]; born 4 January 1952) is a French Polynesian politician who served as President of French Polynesia from 2014 to 2023. He previously presided over the Assembly of French Polynesia on three occasions: from April 2007 to February 2008, from February 2009 to April 2009 and from May 2013 to September 2014. Until 2015, Fritch was co-president of Tahoera'a Huiraatira, a pro-French political party, before he became president of the newly established Tapura Huiraatira.

He became a member of the Assembly of French Polynesia in 1986. He was reelected in 1991, 1996, 2001, 2004, 2008 and 2013. He served as a cabinet minister in French Polynesia several times between 1984 and 2011. From 1996 to 2004, from 2004 to 2005, in 2008 and again from 2009 to 2011, he served as Vice President of French Polynesia under his father-in-law Gaston Flosse. From 2000 to 2008, he was Mayor of Pirae, where he succeeded Flosse. He lost the 2008 election, but remained a municipal councillor. He was reelected to the mayorship in 2014.

== Career ==
Born in Papeete, Fritch graduated from the École des ingénieurs de la Ville de Paris. He came back from metropolitan France in 1980 to work for the commune of Pirae.

=== 2008 French Polynesian legislative election ===
The 2008 French Polynesian legislative election took place on January 27, 2008, and February 10, 2008. The pro-French political of former President Gaston Tong Sang, O Porinetia To Tatou Ai'a, secured 27 of the 57 seats in the new French Polynesian Assembly. Fritch's Tahoeraa Huiraatira party won 10 seats.

Negotiations between Fritch and Tong Sang reportedly broke down earlier in the week of February 17. Tong Sang said that he was prepared to offer Fritch's Tahoeraa Huiraatira party the Speaker of the Assembly, as well as 4 of the 15 ministerial posts, should he form a new government. Fritch refused Tong Sang's offer, saying that he wanted no less than five ministerial positions.

However, the two sides finally reached an eleventh-hour deal between Tong Sang's O Porinetia To Tatou Ai'a party and the Tahoeraa Huiraatira to form a new pro-French coalition in the Assembly. On Thursday, February 21, 2008, Tong Sang announced that he had offered Fritch's Tahoeraa Huiraatira five ministerial positions, which Fritch had wanted, plus the Speakership of the Assembly and the chairmanships of three parliamentary committees.

Fritch was re-elected as the President of the Assembly inaugural sitting of the new 2008 legislative assembly following the political deal. Fritch was re-elected with a total of 36 votes while pro-independence candidate Antony Géros came in second with 21 votes.

He served as Speaker for only two months under Gaston Flosse in 2008 until Gaston Tong Sang was elected president in April 2008.

=== 2009 French Polynesian presidential election ===
Fritch stood as a candidate for President of French Polynesia for the Tahoera'a Huiraatira party in the 2009 French Polynesian presidential election. However, he failed to garner enough votes, coming in third place to Oscar Temaru.

Fritch was once again elected as the President of the Assembly of French Polynesia on February 12, 2009. His election as Speaker was part of the coalition agreement which allowed Oscar Temaru to be elected president the day before. Fritch was elected with the support of 38 of the 57 members of the Assembly.

On April 9, 2009, a second election was held for President of the Assembly following a reshuffling of the government. Former President Gaston Tong Sang had moved to join the ruling coalition of President Oscar Temaru. Fritch initially resisted calls for a new election, saying that his position was necessary for the current April 9 Assembly session. However, a new election was held following legal advice from the French Council of State in Paris.

Fritch was defeated by Philip Schyle in the election on Thursday morning, April 9, 2009. Schyle, a member of the O Porinetia To Tatou Ai'a, received 40 votes, while Fritch garnered obtained just 14 votes. One Assembly member did not vote and there were two blank ballots. Schyle immediately became the new Speaker.

In a speech following his ouster as president, Fritch expressed "disappointment" that the UPLD-Tahoeraa political alliance was in trouble. He called the timing of the election unfortunate "in a time of economic crisis." He also accused the new alliance between President Temaru and former President Gaston Tong Sang as being inspired by French President Nicolas Sarkozy.

On 1 March 2011 he was sacked as vice-president from the Cabinet of Gaston Tong Sang for failing to support the budget.

=== 2012 French legislative election ===
Fritch was elected on 16 June 2012 as member of the National Assembly of France in the 1st constituency of French Polynesia. He seated in the Union for Democrats and Independents group in the National Assembly, chaired by former minister Jean-Louis Borloo. He resigned in April 2014 because of a new law preventing cumulative mandates.

=== 2018 French Polynesian presidential election ===
He was re-elected to the Assembly in the 2023 election.

== Honours and decorations ==
=== Territorial honours ===
Ribbon bar	Honour
	Grand Cross of the Order of Tahiti Nui (automatically after entering office of President of French Polynesia)

== See also ==
- President of French Polynesia
- Assembly of French Polynesia
- Tapura Huiraatira
- Order of Tahiti Nui
