= 2013 French Polynesian legislative election =

← 2008	21 April 2013 (first round); 5 May 2013 (second round)	2018 →
- 57 seats in the Assembly of French Polynesia; 29 seats needed for a majority
- Turnout: 66.07% (first round); 72.79% (second round)
Party	Leader	Vote %	Seats	+/–
Tahoera'a Huiraatira	Gaston Flosse	45.11	38	+28
Union for Democracy	Oscar Temaru	29.26	11	−8
A Tia Porinetia	Teva Rohfritsch	25.63	8	New
This lists parties that won seats. See the complete results below.
President before	President after
Oscar Temaru; UD	Gaston Flosse; Tahoera'a Huiraatira

Legislative elections were held in French Polynesia on 21 April and 5 May 2013. The result was a landslide victory for the Tahoera'a Huiraatira party, which won 38 of the 57 seats in the Assembly.

== Electoral system ==
The election was held using a two round system. In the first round, parties were required to cross a threshold of 12.5% in order to participate in the second round, although parties receiving between 5% and 12.5% were allowed to form an alliance for the second round with a party that did qualify. In the second round, 38 seats are allocated by proportional representation, with the party receiving the most votes gaining an additional 19 seats.

== Campaign ==
The Union for Democracy alliance was continued for the elections, consisting of Aia Api, Here Ai'a, Tavini Huiraatira, Tapura Amui No Raromatai and Tapura Amui No Te Faatereraa Manahune – Tuhaa Pae (a coalition between ULPD members and the Tapura Amui no Tuhaa Pae party). A new alliance, A Tia Porinetia, was formed for the election, which included To Tatou Aia and several smaller parties.

After being knocked out in the first round, Emile Vernier, leader of the Rally for the Respect of the Polynesian Population, gave his backing to A Tia Porinetia.

== Results ==
Party	First round		Second round		Seats	+/–
Party	Votes	%	Votes	%	Seats	+/–
Tahoera'a Huiraatira	51,316	40.16	62,340	45.11	38	+28
Union for Democracy	30,781	24.09	40,441	29.26	11	–8
A Tia Porinetia	25,453	19.92	35,421	25.63	8	New
Porinetia Ora	7,293	5.71			0	New
Ia Tura to'u Femus	4,553	3.56			0	New
Te Ara Ti'a	3,956	3.10			0	New
Te Hiti Tau Api	3,079	2.41			0	New
Rally for the Respect of the Polynesian Population	885	0.69			0	New
Amuitahiraa Huiraatira	452	0.35			0	New
Total	127,768	100.00	138,202	100.00	57	0
Valid votes	127,768	98.75	138,202	98.99		
Invalid/blank votes	1,621	1.25	1,412	1.01		
Total votes	129,389	100.00	139,614	100.00		
Registered voters/turnout	195,835	66.07	191,799	72.79		
Source: Tahiti Infos

== See also ==
- List of members of the Assembly of French Polynesia (2013–2018)
