= Gaston Tong Sang =

Former President of French Polynesia

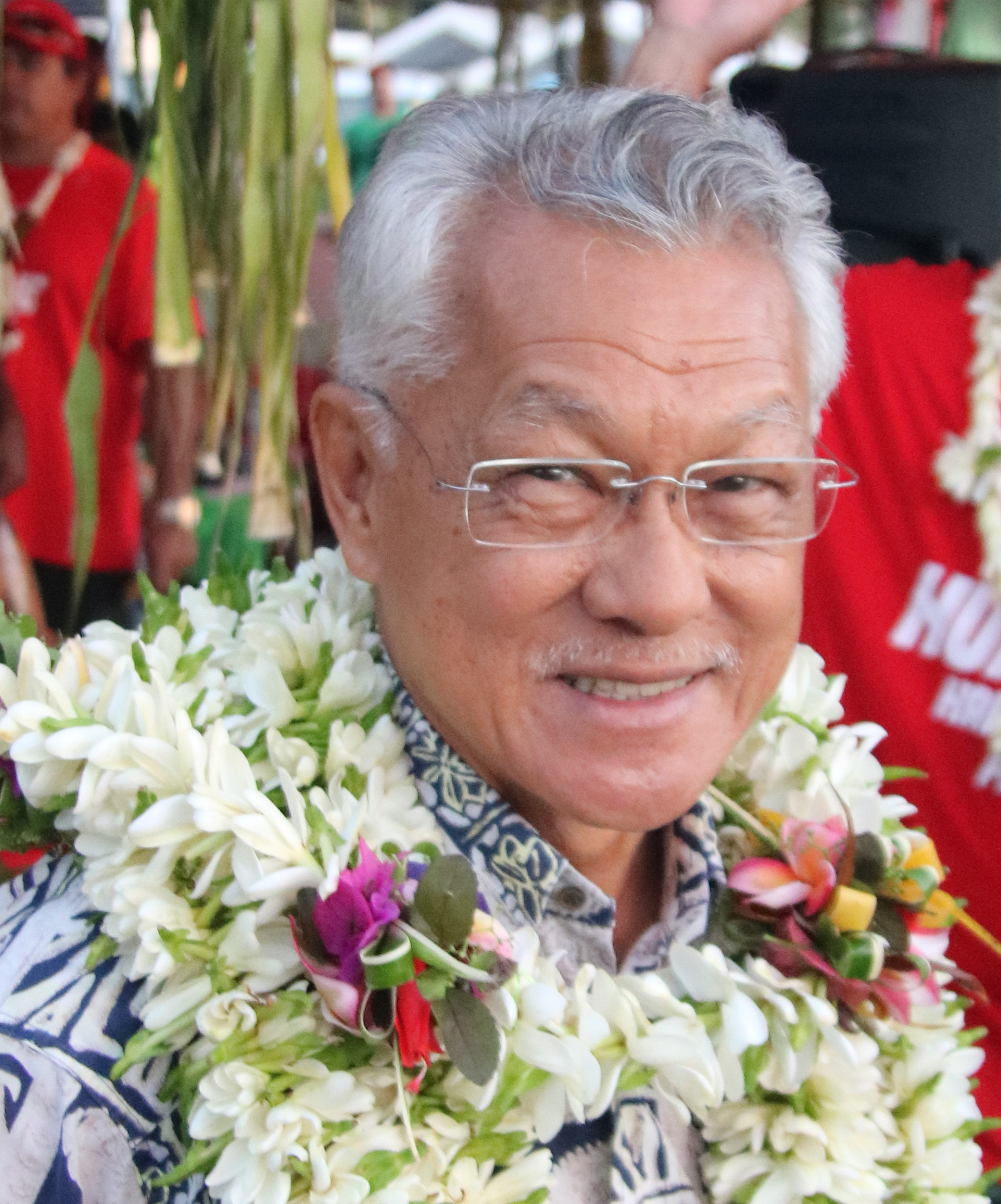
- Tong Sang in 2018

President of French Polynesia
- In office 25 November 2009 – 1 April 2011
- Vice President: Édouard Fritch; Tearii Alpha
- Preceded by: Oscar Temaru
- Succeeded by: Oscar Temaru
- In office 15 April 2008 – 12 February 2009
- Vice President: Jules Ienfa
- Preceded by: Gaston Flosse
- Succeeded by: Oscar Temaru
- In office 26 December 2006 – 31 August 2007
- Vice President: Temauri Foster
- Preceded by: Oscar Temaru
- Succeeded by: Oscar Temaru

President of the Assembly of French Polynesia
- In office 17 May 2018 – 11 May 2023
- Preceded by: Marcel Tuihani
- Succeeded by: Antony Géros

Personal details
- Born: 7 August 1949 (age 76) Bora Bora, French Polynesia, France
- Party: Tahoera'a Huiraatira (Popular Rally) (to 2007); O Porinetia To Tatou Ai'a (Polynesia, Our Home) (2007-2013)
- Spouse: ?

Gaston Tong Sang (born 7 August 1949 in Bora Bora) is a French Polynesian politician and is the former President of French Polynesia. He served terms as President of French Polynesia from November 2009 until April 2011, from April 2008 until February 2009 and from December 2006 until September 2007; he is currently (since 1989) the Mayor of Bora-Bora. He is of Chinese descent, and is a founding member of French Polynesia's pro-French Tahoera'a Huiraatira political party.

== Personal life ==
Tong Sang was born in Bora Bora. His mother was Aren Siou Moun, 81, known as Mama Are, who died on 21 July 2007.

== President of French Polynesia ==
Tong Sang was the Tahoera'a Huiraatira party's presidential candidate in the election of March 2005, but was defeated by Oscar Temaru by 29 votes to 26. On 26 December 2006, Tong Sang was elected President of French Polynesia by 31 votes to 26.

On 18 January 2007 Tong Sang's new government survived a motion of no confidence brought by the party of former French Polynesian president, Oscar Temaru. Only 26 MPs showed up for the vote, which needed three additional MPs in order to pass.

=== 2007 Political Crisis ===
Gaston Tong Sang was heavily criticized by former French Polynesian President Gaston Flosse in July 2007. Flosse, a powerful pro-France politician and founder of the Tahoeraa Huiraatira Party, of which Tong Sang is a member, accused Tong Sang of caving in too easily to the demands of some of French Polynesia's minor coalition parties and ignoring the needs of Tahoeraa Huiraatira.

Critics of Flosse charged that the allegations against Tong Sang were a move by Flosse to regain the presidency. Flosse's critics bolstered their charges against Flosse when it was revealed that Flosse had held "secret talks" with Oscar Temaru, a leading pro-independence politician who has been Flosse's long time political opponent in the past. According to reports, the talks were aimed at ousting Tong Sang from office and setting up a unity platform between Flosse and Temaru's respective political parties.

A no confidence motion was introduced by Temaru's Union for Democracy (UPLD) party on Wednesday, 29 August 2007. The UPLD said that the no confidence motion against Tong Sang was based on the fact that he had only small support in Parliament and that he had lost his legitimacy to govern. Tong Sang's own Tahoeraa Huiraatira party asked President Tong Sang to resign ahead of the vote of no confidence against him. Tong Sang refused the calls from his party to step down.

Gaston Tong Sang was removed from office and his government fell after a vote of no confidence on 31 August 2007. The motion of no confidence was passed by French Polynesia's 57 member Parliament. The motion against Tong Sang was passed by a majority 35 members of Parliament, including some members of Tong Sang's own Tahoera'a Huiraatira party. Tong Sang had tried to save his government by offering Tahoer'a Huiraatira 7 ministerial posts. The party refused.

The motion against Tong Sang was the first time that Oscar Temaru's Unity for Democracy Party and Gaston Flosse's Tahoera'a Huiraatira party had formed a de facto alliance to oust a sitting French Polynesian government.

Tong Sang continued on as part of a caretaker government position until new elections were held on 10 September 2007.

The Tong Sang government was the third French Polynesian government to fall to motions of no confidence in the preceding three years, prompting calls for reform.

On 14 September 2007, Temaru was elected as President of French Polynesia for the third time in three years, replacing Tong Sang.

Tong Sang subsequently founded a new party, O Porinetia To Tatou Ai'a, on 1 October 2007.

On 15 April 2008 Tong Sang again became President following a no confidence motion against the government of Gaston Flosse. He resigned again on 8 February 2009, and Oscar Temaru became president again after beating Tong Sang in the presidential election on 12 February 2009.

=== Return to the Presidency (2009-2011) ===
He became president again on 25 November 2009 after Temaru fell in a vote of no confidence. He fell to a vote of no confidence himself on 1 April 2011.

=== President of the Assembly (since 2018) ===
He was elected as the President of the Assembly of French Polynesia on 17 May 2018.

He was re-elected to the Assembly in the 2023 election, but lost the presidency of the Assembly as Tapura lost its majority. He was replaced by Antony Géros.

Political offices
Preceded by Oscar Temaru	President of French Polynesia; 2006 – 2007	Succeeded by Oscar Temaru
Preceded by Gaston Flosse	President of French Polynesia; 2008 – 2009	Succeeded by Oscar Temaru
Preceded by Oscar Temaru	President of French Polynesia; 2009 – 2011	Succeeded by Oscar Temaru
