= Oscar Temaru =

Former President of French Polynesia

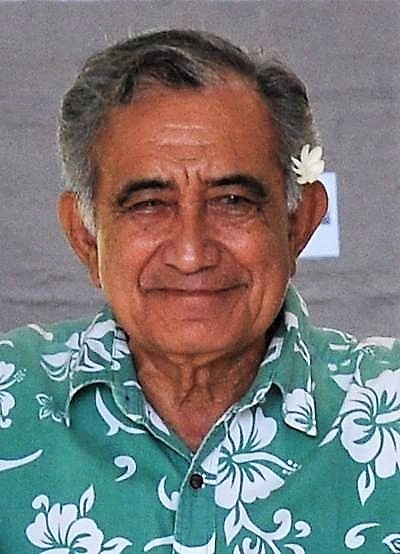
- Temaru in 2015

President of French Polynesia
- In office April 1, 2011 – May 17, 2013
- Vice President: Antony Géros
- Preceded by: Gaston Tong Sang
- Succeeded by: Gaston Flosse
- In office 12 February 2009 – 25 November 2009
- Vice President: Antony Géros
- Preceded by: Gaston Tong Sang
- Succeeded by: Gaston Tong Sang
- In office September 13, 2007 – February 23, 2008
- Vice President: Antony Géros
- Preceded by: Gaston Tong Sang
- Succeeded by: Gaston Flosse
- In office March 3, 2005 – December 26, 2006
- Vice President: Jacqui Drollet
- Preceded by: Gaston Flosse
- Succeeded by: Gaston Tong Sang
- In office June 14, 2004 – October 23, 2004
- Vice President: Jacqui Drollet
- Preceded by: Gaston Flosse
- Succeeded by: Gaston Flosse

Personal details
- Born: November 1, 1944 (age 82) Faʻaʻā, Tahiti, French Polynesia, France
- Party: Tavini Huiraatira

Oscar Manutahi Temaru (born November 1, 1944) is a Tahitian politician. He has been the president of French Polynesia, an overseas collectivity of France, on five occasions: in 2004, from 2005 to 2006, from 2007 to 2008, in 2009, and from 2011 to 2013. He has also been mayor of Faʻaʻā since 1983.

== Career ==
He first served as the President of French Polynesia (président de la Polynésie française) from June 15, 2004 until his Government lost a no-confidence motion on October 8, 2004. He was the caretaker President for two weeks after that, but was forced to give up the presidency until March 2005, when he was reelected after parliamentary by-elections.

He is leader of the five party coalition Union For Democracy, which includes his pro-independence party Tavini Huiraatira (People's Servant Party) and other smaller parties that support autonomy for French Polynesia rather than independence. Those parties unexpectedly defeated supporters of long-time leader Gaston Flosse in the May 2004 parliamentary elections.

On October 8, 2004, his government was censured and ousted by the Parliament, the Assembly of French Polynesia (Assemblée de la Polynésie française) by a vote of 29 to 28. There were calls for the French Government to step in and hold new elections, and allegations by the French Socialist Party that his Government was subject to acts of "methodical destabilisation" on the part of the French government. Gaston Flosse was re-elected President by the Assembly in a simple majority vote on October 22. The President of the Assembly, Antony Géros, cast doubt on the legitimacy of this election saying the vote for President (président de la Polynésie française) should occur on October 25 (see French Polynesia political crisis 2004). As a compromise, by-elections were set for February 13, 2005 for certain seats, which Temaru's coalition won. He was re-elected president (président de la Polynésie française) on March 3, 2005.

Temaru lost a vote of no confidence on 13 December 2006, after months of protests against the high cost of living in French Polynesia. Temaru had lost control of parliament due to defections. Gaston Tong Sang won the presidential election on December 26.

Temaru ran for parliament in the 2007 elections, but failed to win a seat.

On September 14, 2007, Temaru was elected as President of French Polynesia for the third time in three years (with 27 of 44 votes). He replaced Tong Sang, who lost a no-confidence vote on August 31.

On 12 February 2009, he was elected president yet again. He fell in a vote of no confidence on 25 November 2009, and was again replaced by Tong Sang.

He became President again on 1 April 2011.

It was under Temaru's presidency that French Polynesia became, in November 2011, a founding member of the Polynesian Leaders Group, a regional grouping intended to cooperate on a variety of issues including culture and language, education, responses to climate change, and trade and investment.

He was twice elected as the President of the Assembly of French Polynesia from February 2008 to February 2009, and from April 2010 to April 2011.

He was re-elected to the Assembly in the 2023 election.

== Background ==
Temaru was born at Faʻaʻā on the island of Tahiti. He was educated in Faʻaʻā and Papeete, where he received a thorough religious education. He was born to a Tahitian father and a Cook Island Māori mother, and has stated that he has Chinese ancestry.

He attended secondary school in New Caledonia, where he met Jean-Marie Tjibaou, who would become leader of the Kanak Socialist National Liberation Front (FLNKS).

Temaru entered the French Navy for three years in 1961 and participated in the Algerian War of Independence. On his return to French Polynesia, he sat the exam to become a customs officer in Tahiti. In 1983, he retired from this position.

Temaru has been a vocal campaigner against nuclear testing by France at Moruroa and Fangataufa Atolls since the 1970s. His main power base has been in the poor suburb of Faʻaʻā on the outskirts of the capital Papeete.

In 1977, Oscar Temaru formed his political party, the Front for the Liberation of Polynesia (FLP). The party changed its name in 1983 to Tavini Huiraatira (People's Servant Party). The same year he was elected mayor of Faʻaʻā, which position he continues to hold (as of 2024).

In 1986, Tavini Huiraatira obtained two seats in the territorial assembly, four seats in 1991, eleven in 1996, and thirteen in 2001. In 2004 the Union for Democracy Coalition won 27 of the 57 seats.

Temaru's coalition government program in 2004 included the gradual increase of the minimum wage to 150.000 Fcfp, work days that don’t start before 9 am, an improvement of social services, political decentralisation, educational reform, and a revision of the new autonomy statute after French Polynesia was declared a French Overseas Country (pays d'outre-mer) in March 2004.

He pledged there would be no immediate moves to independence.

When asked by an Australian Broadcasting Corporation reporter "Most people call this place French Polynesia. What do you call it?" he replied "This is French-occupied Polynesia. That is the truth. This country has been occupied."

In 2007, Temaru was convicted of racial discrimination by the Correctional Court of Papeete for referring to Europeans who come to live in French Polynesia as "aiha" during an interview in Tahitian on RFO Radio Polynesia. The term translates as "waste from the sea" or "good for nothing" according to the Dictionary of the Tahitian Academy. Fined 500,000 Pacific Francs (€4.000) Temaru indicated his intention to appeal the conviction.

In September 2019, Oscar Temaru was convicted of conflict of interest (prise illégale d'intérêts) by the criminal court of Papeete for exercising undue influence as mayor of Faʻaʻā. The court found that under Temaru's watch, the municipality of Faʻaʻā had provided funding of 150 million Pacific Francs (US$1.4 million) to a pro-independence community station, Radio Tefana, which promoted Temaru's political party. Oscar Temaru was given a suspended six-month prison sentence and fined five million Pacific francs (US$46,500). In May 2023 the conviction was thrown out on appeal, after the court found that the government had not provided any evidence that the broadcasts were propaganda.

== See also ==
- Politics of French Polynesia
- 2004 French Polynesian legislative election
- List of political parties in French Polynesia

Political offices
Preceded by Gaston Flosse	President of French Polynesia; 2004	Succeeded by Gaston Flosse
Preceded by Gaston Flosse	President of French Polynesia; 2005 – 2006	Succeeded by Gaston Tong Sang
Preceded by Gaston Tong Sang	President of French Polynesia; 2007 – 2008	Succeeded by Gaston Flosse
Preceded by Gaston Tong Sang	President of French Polynesia; 2009	Succeeded by Gaston Tong Sang
Preceded by Gaston Tong Sang	President of French Polynesia; 2011 – 2013	Succeeded by Gaston Flosse
