= Gaston Flosse =

Former President of French Polynesia

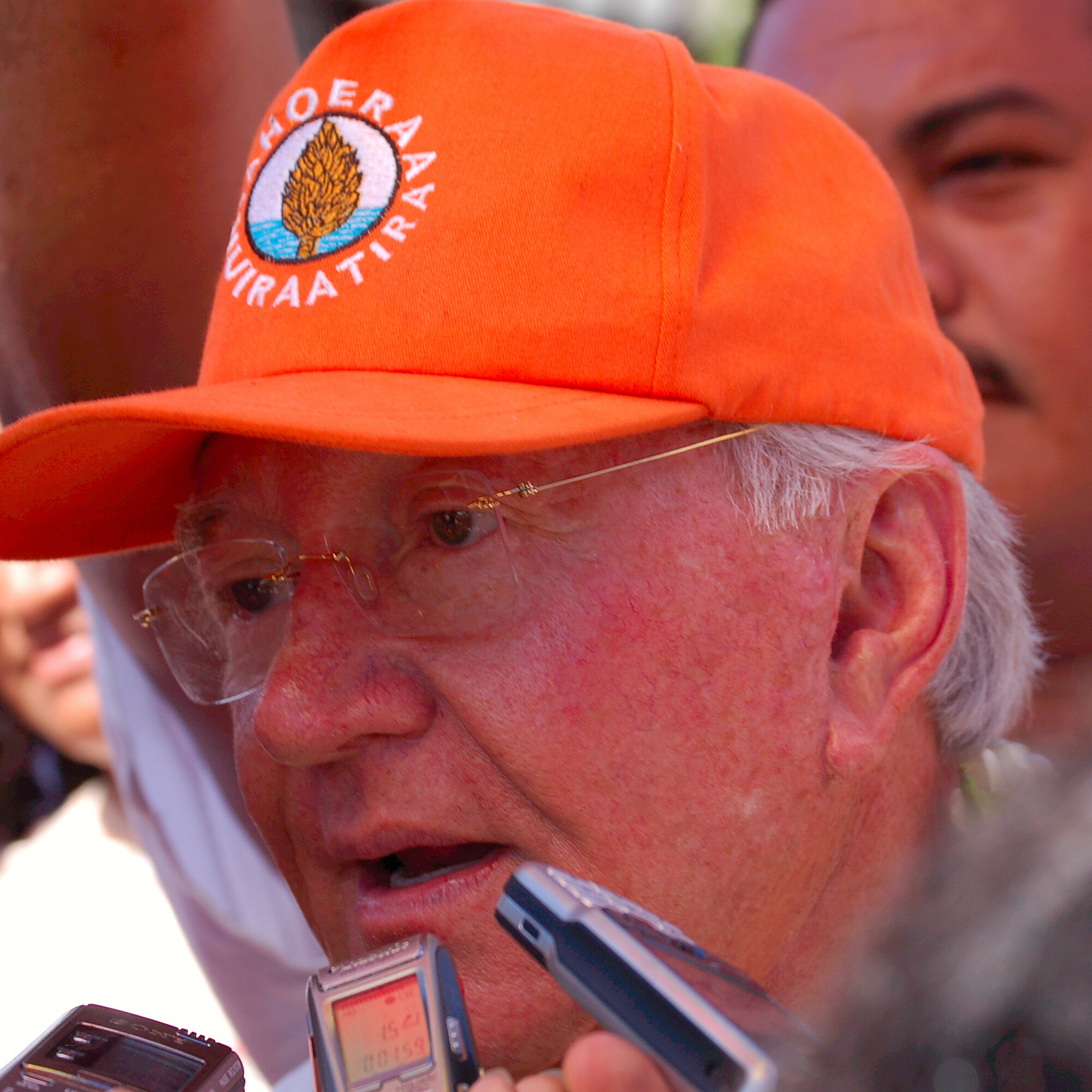
- Flosse in 2006

President of French Polynesia
- In office 17 May 2013 – 5 September 2014
- Vice President: Nuihau Laurey
- Preceded by: Oscar Temaru
- Succeeded by: Édouard Fritch
- In office 23 February 2008 – 15 April 2008
- Vice President: Édouard Fritch
- Preceded by: Oscar Temaru
- Succeeded by: Gaston Tong Sang
- In office 23 October 2004 – 3 March 2005
- Vice President: Édouard Fritch
- Preceded by: Oscar Temaru
- Succeeded by: Oscar Temaru
- In office 4 April 1991 – 14 June 2004
- Vice President: Michel Buillard; Édouard Fritch
- Preceded by: Alexandre Léontieff
- Succeeded by: Oscar Temaru

1st President of the Government
- In office 14 September 1984 – 12 February 1987
- Vice President: Alexandre Léontieff; Patrick Peaucellier
- Preceded by: Office created
- Succeeded by: Jacques Teuira

Personal details
- Born: 24 June 1931 (age 95) Rikitea, Mangareva, French Polynesia, France
- Party: Tahoera'a Huiraatira
- Spouse: Tonita Flosse

Gaston Flosse (born 24 June 1931) is a French Polynesian politician who served as President of French Polynesia on five occasions. He is currently a member of the Senate of France and has been a French junior minister under Jacques Chirac. He received sentences for corruption, which are under appeal.

== Life and career ==
Flosse was born in Rikitea, Mangareva, French Polynesia. He is of both French and Polynesian descent.

Flosse supports the current autonomy arrangement between French Polynesia and France and has led the conservative pro-autonomy and anti-independence party Tahoera'a Huiraatira (People's Rally for the Republic Party) for more than 20 years. He was the vice-president of the government council from 1982 to 1984, when more autonomy was gained and he became President of the Governing Council. He held that position from 1984 to 1987 and from 1991 to 2004.

On 27 February 2004 French Polynesian autonomy was again increased, and Flosse became President of French Polynesia (Le président de la Polynésie française). Shortly after, though, his party lost the parliamentary elections, and on June 15, he left office when the parliament, the Assembly of French Polynesia (Assemblée de la Polynésie française), elected the pro-independence leader, Oscar Temaru, to the post.

On 22 October 2004 he was re-elected to the presidency, and he took office that day, although doubt was cast on the legitimacy of this election by Antony Géros, the President of the French Polynesia Assembly (see French Polynesia political crisis 2004). On 13 February 2005 Flosse's party lost the parliamentary by-elections, which had been called as a compromise after pressure from Temaru's supporters. On 15 February 2005 Flosse lost the presidency again in a parliamentary confidence vote, and on 3 March 2005 Temaru took over.

Apart from having been president of the territory, he has also been both tourism minister and housing minister. He is the mayor of Pirea municipality north of Papeete and has represented the territory in the National Assembly of France. He was first elected to the Senate of France on 1 October 1998.

Flosse was able to govern French Polynesia with the support of centrist parties and groupings. He and former French President Jacques Chirac had a close personal association, Chirac being a godfather to Flosse's youngest son. This relationship gave the Tahitian special access to the highest levels of power in France, which he utilised in negotiating aid packages and financial support for the territory.

On 21 June 2006 Flosse was convicted of corruption and given a three-month suspended sentence. The court found that he had abused his political office in connection with a hotel purchase. He continued to be a member of the territorial assembly and French Senate.

Flosse's party came third in the February 2008 legislative assembly elections, but with the support of Oscar Temaru and his UPLD (Union for Democracy) party, which came second, Flosse became President of French Polynesia again on 23 February 2008. He was replaced by Gaston Tong Sang after losing a vote of confidence on 15 April 2008, however.

Flosse was re-elected to the French Senate in the September 2008 Senate election.

In January 2022 Flosse declared his support for independence for French Polynesia, saying that autonomy within France had worked as long as Jacques Chirac was French president and had since been eroded.

In July 2024 he stepped down as president of the ʻĀmuitahiraʻa o te Nūnaʻa Māʻohi party.

== Political career ==
Governmental function

Secretary of State for South Pacific: 1986-1988.

Electoral mandates

European Parliament

Member of European Parliament for France: 1984-1986 (Became ministre in 1986).

National Assembly of France

Member of the National Assembly of France for French Polynesia (2nd constituency): 1978-1982 (Resignation) March–April 1986 (Became minister in 1986) / 1993-1997. Elected in 1978, reelected in 1981, 1986, 1993.

Senate of France

Senator of French Polynesia: 1998-2014. Elected in 1998, reelected in 2008. Deprived by the Constitutional Council of France on 16 September 2014.

Presidency of the French Polynesia

President of the French Polynesia: 2004-2005 / February–April 2008 / 2013-2014. Deprived by the Council of State on 5 September 2014.

President of the government of French Polynesia: 1984-1987 / 1991-2004. Reelected in 1991, 1996 and 2001.

Vice-president of the government of French Polynesia: 1982-1984.

French Polynesia Territorial Assembly

President of the Assembly of French Polynesia: 1972-1974 / 1976-1977.

Member of the Assembly of French Polynesia: 1967-2014. Reelected in 1972, 1977, 1982, 1986, 1991, 1996, 2001, 2004, 2008 and 2013. Deprived by the Council of State on 5 September 2014.

Municipal Council

Mayor of Pirae: 1965-2000 (Resignation). Reelected in 1971, 1977, 1983, 1989, 1995.

Municipal councillor of Pirae: 1965-2000 (Resignation). Reelected in 1971, 1977, 1983, 1989, 1995.

== See also ==
- Politics of French Polynesia
- 2004 French Polynesian legislative election
- List of political parties in French Polynesia

Political offices
Preceded by New title	President of French Polynesia; 1984 – 1987	Succeeded by Jacky Teuira
Preceded by Alexandre Léontieff	President of French Polynesia; 1991 – 2004	Succeeded by Oscar Temaru
Preceded by Oscar Temaru	President of French Polynesia; 2004 – 2005	Succeeded by Oscar Temaru
Preceded by Oscar Temaru	President of French Polynesia; 2008	Succeeded by Gaston Tong Sang
Preceded by Oscar Temaru	President of French Polynesia; 2013 – 2014	Succeeded by Édouard Fritch
