= Assembly of French Polynesia =

French overseas country legislature

Assembly of French Polynesia Assemblée de la Polynésie française Te apoʻoraʻa rahi o te fenua Māʻohi
- List of members of the Assembly of French Polynesia (2023–2028)

Type
- Type: Unicameral

Leadership
- Speaker: Antony Géros, Tāvini Huiraʻatira since 11 May 2023

Structure
- Seats: 57
- Political groups: Government (38) Tāvini Huiraʻatira (38) Opposition (19) Tāpura Huiraʻatira (15) A here ia Porinetia (3) ʻĀmuitahiraʻa o te Nūnaʻa Māʻohi (1)

Elections
- Last election: 16 and 30 April 2023
- Next election: 2028

Meeting place
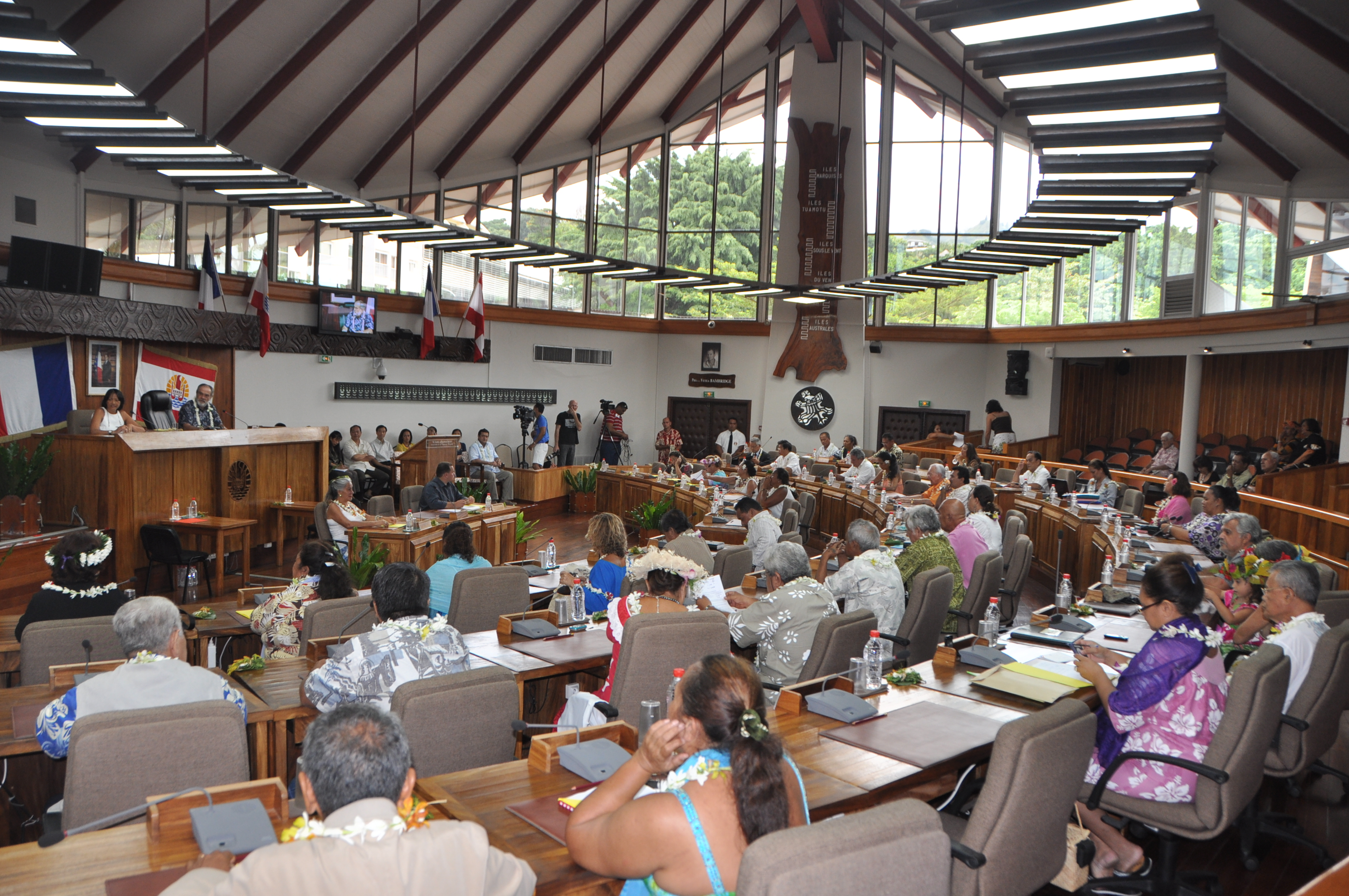
- Place Tarahoi, Papeete, Tahiti, French Polynesia, France

Website
- www.assemblee.pf

The Assembly of French Polynesia (French: Assemblée de la Polynésie française, [asɑ̃ble d(ə) la pɔlinezi fʁɑ̃sɛːz]; Tahitian: Te apoʻoraʻa rahi o te fenua Māʻohi) is the unicameral legislature of French Polynesia, an overseas country of the French Republic. It is located at Place Tarahoi in Papeete, Tahiti. It was established in its current form in 1996 although a Tahitian Assembly was first created in 1824. It consists of 57 members who are elected by popular vote for five years; the electoral system is based upon proportional representation in six multi-seat constituencies. Every constituency is represented by at least three representatives. Since 2001, the parity bill binds that the number of women matches the number of men elected to the assembly.

The official language of the Assembly is French. The most recent election was held in 2023 and resulted in the victory of Tāvini Huiraʻatira, which won 38 seats. Aside from passing legislation and scrutinising the government, the Assembly is responsible for electing the President of French Polynesia for a four-year term. The number of seats was changed from 49 to 57 on 23 May 2004, for the 2004 election. On 13 February 2005, by-elections for the Assembly were held in the constituency of the Windward Islands (circonscription des Îles du Vent). The next general election is scheduled in 2028.

== Constituencies ==
The six electoral districts (circonscriptions électorales) are:

- electoral circumscription of the Windward Islands (circonscription des Îles du Vent) (37 members)
- electoral circumscription of the Leeward Islands (circonscription des Îles Sous-le-Vent) (8 members)
- electoral circumscription of the Austral Islands (circonscription des Îles Australes) (3 members)
- electoral circumscription of the Gambier Islands and the Islands Tuamotu-East (circonscription des Îles Gambier et Tuamotu Est) (3 members)
- electoral circumscription of the Islands Tuamotu-West (circonscription des Îles Tuamotu Ouest) (3 members)
- electoral circumscription of the Marquesas Islands (circonscription des Îles Marquises) (3 members)

== President of the Assembly of French Polynesia ==
=== L’Assemblée représentative (1946–1953) ===
Name	Took office	Left office	Notes
Joseph Quesnot	11 March 1946	30 May 1949	
Jean Millaud	30 May 1949	20 October 1951	
Albert Leboucher	20 October 1951	14 March 1953	

=== L’Assemblée territoriale (1953–1996) ===
Name	Took office	Left office	Notes
Jean-Baptiste Céran-Jérusalémy	14 March 1953	18 October 1953	
Noël Ilari	18 October 1953	10 June 1955	
Walter Grand	10 June 1955	23 April 1958	
Jean-Baptiste Céran-Jérusalémy	23 April 1958	27 May 1958	
Georges Leboucher	27 May 1958	20 May 1959	
Jacques Tauraa	20 May 1959	2 March 1961	
Frantz Vanizette	2 March 1961	6 November 1962	
Jacques Tauraa	6 November 1962	17 May 1968	
Jean Millaud	17 May 1968	17 June 1969	
John Teariki	17 June 1969	14 May 1970	
Jean Millaud	14 May 1970	13 May 1971	
John Teariki	13 May 1971	25 May 1972	
Jean Millaud	25 May 1972	5 October 1972	
Gaston Flosse	5 October 1972	5 June 1974	
Frantz Vanizette	5 June 1974	10 June 1976	
Gaston Flosse	10 June 1976	7 June 1977	
Frantz Vanizette	7 June 1977	28 April 1978	
John Teariki	28 April 1978	29 May 1979	
Frantz Vanizette	29 May 1979	30 May 1980	
John Teariki	30 May 1980	29 May 1981	
Frantz Vanizette	29 May 1981	1 June 1982	
Émile Vernaudon	1 June 1982	5 April 1983	
Jacques Teuira	5 April 1983	12 March 1987	
Roger Doom	12 March 1987	10 May 1988	
Jean Juventin	10 May 1988	28 March 1991	
Émile Vernaudon	28 March 1991	2 April 1992	
Jean Juventin	2 April 1992	6 April 1995	
Tinomana Ebb	6 April 1995	23 May 1996	

=== L'Assemblée de la Polynésie française (After 1996) ===
Name	Took office	Left office	Notes
Justin Arapari	23 May 1996	17 May 2001	
Lucette Taero	17 May 2001	3 June 2004	
Antony Géros	3 June 2004	16 November 2004	
Hirohiti Tefaarere	16 November 2004	14 April 2005	
Antony Géros	14 April 2005	13 April 2006	
Philip Schyle	13 April 2006	13 April 2007	
Édouard Fritch	13 April 2007	29 February 2008	
Oscar Temaru	29 February 2008	12 February 2009	
Édouard Fritch	12 February 2009	9 April 2009	
Philip Schyle	9 April 2009	9 April 2010	
Oscar Temaru	9 April 2010	14 April 2011	
Jacqui Drollet	14 April 2011	16 May 2013	
Édouard Fritch	16 May 2013	16 September 2014	
Marcel Tuihani	16 September 2014	17 May 2018	
Gaston Tong Sang	17 May 2018	11 May 2023	
Antony Géros	11 May 2023	Incumbent	

== Elections ==
Turnout in the first round declined, to 60.08%. Tāvini Huiraʻatira led in the first round with about 35% of the vote. Following the first round, Heiura-Les Verts and Hau Māʻohi both endorsed the Tāvini. The ʻĀmuitahiraʻa o te Nūnaʻa Māʻohi merged its list with Tāpura Huiraʻatira, forming a joint Union of Autonomists Against Independence. A here ia Porinetia announced that its presidential candidate would be Nicole Sanquer rather than Nuihau Laurey. Ia Ora te Nuna'a called on its voters to vote for either of the autonomist parties in the second round.

In second round on 30 April 2023 turnout was 69.96%. Pro independence party Tavini jumped to 38 seats from 8 seats in previous election. Pro autonomist Tapura got 15 seats, ally Amuitahira got 1 seat and A here ia got 3 seats. Pro independence Tavini got the majority first time in electoral history.

French Polynesia Assembly 2023
Party	First round		Second round		Seats	+/–
Party	Votes	%	Votes	%	Seats	+/–
Tāvini Huiraʻatira	43,401	34.90	64,551	44.32	38	+30
Tāpura Huiraʻatira	37,880	30.46	56,118	38.53	15	–23
ʻĀmuitahiraʻa o te Nūnaʻa Māʻohi	14,773	11.88	56,118	38.53	1	–10
A here ia Porinetia	18,067	14.53	24,989	17.16	3	New
Ia Ora te Nuna'a	5,423	4.36			0	New
Hau Māʻohi	2,458	1.98			0	New
Heiura-Les Verts	2,373	1.91			0	New
Total	124,375	100.00	145,658	100.00	57	0
Valid votes	124,375	98.50	145,658	98.97		
Invalid votes	748	0.59	823	0.56		
Blank votes	1,149	0.91	700	0.48		
Total votes	126,272	100.00	147,181	100.00		
Registered voters/turnout	210,161	60.08	210,385	69.96		
Source: Haut-commissaire; (seats)

Following the election Antony Géros was elected President of the Assembly, with 41 votes in favour and 16 abstentions. Moetai Brotherson was elected President of French Polynesia, defeating Édouard Fritch 38 votes to 19.
