= List of members of the Assembly of French Polynesia (2018–2023) =

Members of the Assembly of French Polynesia were elected on 22 April and 6 May 2018. According to second-round results, the 57 representatives consisted of 38 representatives of Tapura Huiraatira, 11 for Tahoera'a Huiraatira, and 8 for Tavini Huiraatira.

== Members ==
Name	Section	Party
Édouard Fritch	Windward Isles 1	Tapura Huiraatira
Nicole Bouteau	Windward Isles 1	Tapura Huiraatira
Michel Buillard	Windward Isles 1	Tapura Huiraatira
Sylvana Puhetini	Windward Isles 1	Tapura Huiraatira
Philip Schyle	Windward Isles 1	Tapura Huiraatira
Virginie Bruant	Windward Isles 1	Tapura Huiraatira
John Toromona	Windward Isles 1	Tapura Huiraatira
Romilda Tahiata	Windward Isles 1	Tapura Huiraatira
Vaiata Perry-Friedman	Windward Isles 1	Tahoera'a Huiraatira
Angélo Frébault	Windward Isles 1	Tahoera'a Huiraatira
Vaitea Le Gayic	Windward Isles 1	Tahoera'a Huiraatira
Chantal Galenon	Windward Isles 1	Tavini Huiraatira
Richard Tuheiava	Windward Isles 1	Tavini Huiraatira
Nicole Sanquer	Windward Isles 2	Tapura Huiraatira
Jacquie Graffe	Windward Isles 2	Tapura Huiraatira
Béatrice Lucas	Windward Isles 2	Tapura Huiraatira
Henri Flohr	Windward Isles 2	Tapura Huiraatira
Tepuaraurii Teriitahi	Windward Isles 2	Tapura Huiraatira
Putai Taae	Windward Isles 2	Tapura Huiraatira
Juliette Matehau-Nuupure	Windward Isles 2	Tapura Huiraatira
Tearii Alpha	Windward Isles 2	Tapura Huiraatira
Tapeta Tetopata	Windward Isles 2	Tapura Huiraatira
Teura Iriti	Windward Isles 2	Tahoera'a Huiraatira
James Heaux	Windward Isles 2	Tahoera'a Huiraatira
Antony Géros	Windward Isles 2	Tavini Huiraatira
Valentina Cross	Windward Isles 2	Tavini Huiraatira
Rony Tumahai	Windward Isles 3	Tapura Huiraatira
Isabelle Sachet	Windward Isles 3	Tapura Huiraatira
Teva Rohfritsch	Windward Isles 3	Tapura Huiraatira
Teura Tarahu-Atuahiva	Windward Isles 3	Tapura Huiraatira
Jean-Christophe Bouissou	Windward Isles 3	Tapura Huiraatira
Dylma Aro	Windward Isles 3	Tapura Huiraatira
Nuihau Laurey	Windward Isles 3	Tapura Huiraatira
Geffry Salmon	Windward Isles 3	Tahoera'a Huiraatira
Oscar Temaru	Windward Isles 3	Tavini Huiraatira
Eliane Tevahitua	Windward Isles 3	Tavini Huiraatira
Moetai Brotherson	Windward Isles 3	Tavini Huiraatira
Gaston Tong Sang	Leeward Isles	Tapura Huiraatira
Lana Tetuanui	Leeward Isles	Tapura Huiraatira
Marcelin Lisan	Leeward Isles	Tapura Huiraatira
Patricia Amaru	Leeward Isles	Tapura Huiraatira
Thomas Moutame	Leeward Isles	Tapura Huiraatira
Augustine Tuuhia	Leeward Isles	Tapura Huiraatira
Sylviane Terooatea	Leeward Isles	Tahoera'a Huiraatira
Teumere Atger-Hoi	Leeward Isles	Tavini Huiraatira
Félix Tokoragi	East Tuamotu and Gambiers	Tapura Huiraatira
Joséphine Teakarotu	East Tuamotu and Gambiers	Tapura Huiraatira
Yseult Butcher	East Tuamotu and Gambiers	Tahoera'a Huiraatira
Teapehu Teahe	West Tuamotu	Tapura Huiraatira
Teina Maraeura	West Tuamotu	Tapura Huiraatira
Bernard Natua	West Tuamotu	Tahoera'a Huiraatira
Joëlle Frébault	Marquesas Islands	Tapura Huiraatira
Benoît Kautai	Marquesas Islands	Tapura Huiraatira
Etienne Tehaamoana	Marquesas Islands	Tahoera'a Huiraatira
Frédéric Riveta	Austral Islands	Tapura Huiraatira
Louisa Tahuhuterani	Austral Islands	Tapura Huiraatira
Fernand Tahiata	Austral Islands	Tapura Huiraatira

== Changes ==
- In August 2018 Tahoera'a Huiraatira MP Bernard Natua switched sides to join Tapura Huiraatira.
- In September 2018 Tahoera'a Huiraatira expelled MP Angélo Frébault from the party. In December 2018 he joined Tapura Huiraatira.
- In October 2018 Tavini Huiraatira leader Oscar Temaru was stripped of his seat after being barred from public office. He was replaced by Cécile Mercier.
- In December 2019 Tapura Huiraatira MP Nicole Sanquer declared that she would sit as an independent.
- In June 2020 Nuihau Laurey left Tapura Huiraatira to sit as an independent.
- In August 2020 Bernard Natua, Teura Tarahu-Atuahiva, and Félix Tokoragi left Tapura Huiraatira and joined independent MPs Nicole Sanquer and Nuihau Laurey and Tahoera'a Huiraatira MP Vaitea Le Gayic to form A here ia Porinetia. In January 2021 Le Gayic resigned and rejoined Tahoera'a, leaving the other 5 MPs as independents.
- Tapeta Tetopata died in March 2021, and was replaced by Maeva Bourgade.
- In March 2022 the Tahoera'a group ceased to be recognised in the Assembly following the resignations of James Heaux and Vaiata Perry-Friedman.
- In June 2022 James Heaux joined Tavini Huiraatira.
