= French Polynesia's 1st constituency =

Constituency of the French Fifth Republic

1st constituency of French Polynesia
- inline Constituency of the National Assembly of France

- Location in French Polynesia
- Deputy: Tematai Le Gayic; Tavini Huiraatira
- Department: French Polynesia (overseas collectivity)
- Cantons: Windward Islands: communes of Arue, Moorea-Maiao, Papeete, Pirae; Marquesas Islands; Tuamotu-Gambier Islands

The 1st constituency of French Polynesia is a French legislative constituency in French Polynesia.

Following the 2010 redistricting of French legislative constituencies, which came into application for the June 2012 legislative election, the boundaries of French Polynesia's two constituencies were redrawn so as to create a third constituency in the collectivity. Since then, the 1st constituency consists of the communes of Arue, Moorea-Maiao, Papeete and Pirae in the Windward Islands, and all communes in the Marquesas Islands (Fatu-Hiva, Hiva-Oa, Nuku-Hiva, Tahuata, Ua-Huka, Ua-Pou) and in the Tuamotu-Gambier Islands (Anaa, Arutua, Fakarava, Fangatau, Gambier, Hao, Hikueru, Makemo, Manihi, Napuka, Nukutavake, Puka-Puka, Rangiroa, Reao, Takaroa, Tatakoto, Tureia).

== Deputies ==
Alexandre Léontieff, who held the seat from 1988 to 1993, was simultaneously President of French Polynesia from 1987 to 1991.

Election	Member	Party
1988	Alexandre Léontieff	SE
1993	Jean Juventin	RPR
1997	Michel Buillard	RPR
2002	Michel Buillard	UMP
2007	Michel Buillard	Tahoera'a Huiraatira
2008	Michel Buillard	DVD
2012	Edouard Fritch	Tahoera'a Huiraatira
2014 (by-election)	Maina Sage	Tahoera'a Huiraatira
2016	Maina Sage	Tapura Huiraatira
2017	Maina Sage	Tapura Huiraatira
2022	Tematai Le Gayic	Tavini Huiraatira
2024	Moerani Frébault	Tapura Huiraatira

== Election results ==
=== 2024 ===
Legislative Election 2024:French Polynesia's 1st constituency
Party	Candidate	Votes	%	±%
Tāpura Huiraʻatira	Moerani Frébault	18,456	53.85	+11.95
Tāvini Huiraʻatira (NFP)	Tematai Le Gayic	12,243	35.72	+15.62
RN	James Heaux	2,168	6.33	N/A
DVE	Jacky Bryant	1,404	4.10	+0.86
Turnout		34,271	98.62	+55.00
Registered electors		73,776		
Tāpura Huiraʻatira gain from Tāvini Huiraʻatira		Swing		

=== 2022 ===
Legislative Election 2022: French Polynesia's 1st constituency
Party	Candidate	Votes	%	±%
Tapura Huiraatira (Ensemble)	Nicole Bouteau	12,970	41.90	-4.04
Tavini Huiraatira (NUPÉS)	Tematai Le Gayic	6,223	20.10	+0.96
Amuitahira'a o te Nuna'a Maohi (UDC)	Pascale Haiti	4,454	14.39	−11.63
A here	Félix Tokoragi	2,980	9.63	N/A
EXD	Tauhiti Nena	1,961	6.33	N/A
DVE	Jacky Bryant	1,003	3.24	N/A
DIV	Jean-Paul Theron	747	2.41	N/A
Others	N/A	615	1.99	
Turnout		30,956	43.62	+1.91
2nd round result
Tavini Huiraatira (NUPÉS)	Tematai Le Gayic	19,523	50.88	N/A
Tapura Huiraatira (Ensemble)	Nicole Bouteau	18,851	49.12	N/A
Turnout		38,374	54.35	+8.25
Tavini Huiraatira gain from Tapura Huiraatira				

=== 2017 ===
Candidate	Label	First round		Second round	
Candidate	Label	Votes	%	Votes	%
Maina Sage	Tapura Huiraatira	13,626	45.94	21,928	68.36
Moana Greig	Tahoera'a Huiraatira	7,717	26.02	10,147	31.64
Richard Tuheiava	Tavini Huiraatira	4,764	16.06		
Tauhiti Nena	DVG	2,070	6.98		
Karl Reguron	ECO	504	1.70		
Éric Minardi	FN	434	1.46		
Jean-Marie Bruneau	FI	408	1.38		
Michel Ramel	DIV	136	0.46		
Votes		29,659	100.00	32,075	100.00
Valid votes		29,659	97.96	32,075	95.86
Blank votes		347	1.15	666	1.99
Null votes		272	0.90	719	2.15
Turnout		30,278	41.71	33,460	46.10
Abstentions		42,319	58.29	39,125	53.90
Registered voters		72,597		72,585	
Source: Ministry of the Interior

=== 2014 By-election ===
Candidate	Party	First round		Second round	
Candidate	Party	Votes	%	Votes	%
Maina Sage	Tahoera'a	12,677	52.96	16,380	58.02
Tauhiti Nena	UPLD	7,951	33.22	11,850	41.98
Debora Kimitete	A Ti'a Porinetia	2,733	11.42		
Tati Salmon	HLV	440	1.84		
Gustave Heitaa	SE	136	0.57		
Registered Voters		70,324		70,310	
Abstentions		46,173	65.66	41,646	59.23
Turnout		24,151	34.34	28,664	40.77
Null Votes		128	0.53	274	0.96
Blank Votes		86	0.36	160	0.56
Valid Votes		23,937	99.11	28,230	98.49

Despite obtaining 52.96% of the vote in the first round, Maina Sage did not obtain 25% of the enrolled voters, so a second round was held.

=== 2012 ===
2012 legislative election in Polynesie-Francaise's 1st constituency
Candidate	Party	First round		Second round	
Candidate	Party	Votes	%	Votes	%
Edouard Fritch	UDI	11,055	36.62%	22,120	63.36%
Pierre Frebault		5,524	18.30%	12,794	36.64%
Louis Frebault	DVG	2,758	9.14%		
Nicole Bouteau	MoDem	2,548	8.44%		
Philip Schyle	DVD	2,533	8.39%		
Quito Braun-Ortega	DVD	1,258	4.17%		
Teaki Dupont-Teikivaeoho	PR	1,131	3.75%		
Poema Tang-Pidoux	UMP	931	3.08%		
Pierre Marchesini	??	421	1.39%		
Karl Reguron	EELV	408	1.35%		
Pita Bennett	DLR	374	1.24%		
Teiva Forteleoni	??	359	1.19%		
Tevahine Mairoto	DVD	311	1.03%		
Robert Anania	DVD	249	0.82%		
Ronald Terorotua	DVG	222	0.74%		
Gustave Heitaa		104	0.34%		
Valid votes		30,186	98.18%	34,914	96.13%
Spoilt and null votes		560	1.82%	1,404	3.87%
Votes cast / turnout		30,746	45.80%	36,318	53.87%
Abstentions		36,386	54.20%	31,106	46.13%
Registered voters		67,132	100.00%	67,424	100.00%

=== 2007 ===
Two rounds were held. These are the results of the second round, for which only the top two candidates from the first round qualified.

Source: French Ministry of the Interior.

Oscar Temaru, who contested the seat unsuccessfully, was a former and future President of French Polynesia.

Legislative Election 2007: French Polynesia 1st - 2nd round
Party	Candidate	Votes	%	±%
DVD	Michel Buillard	32,459	54.07	
Tavini Huiraatira	Oscar Temaru	27,569	45.93	
Turnout		60,876	64.89	
DVD gain from UMP		Swing		

=== 2002 ===
Only a single round was needed, as Buillard obtained an absolute majority of the vote. The results of the top two candidates are given here.

Source: French Ministry of the Interior.

Legislative Election 2002: French Polynesia 1st - single round
Party	Candidate	Votes	%	±%
UMP	Michel Buillard	27 098	61.96	
DVD	Marie-Laure Vanizette	7,074	16.18	
Turnout		44,291	52.58	
UMP hold		Swing		
