= French Polynesia's 3rd constituency =

Constituency of the French Fifth Republic

3rd constituency of French Polynesia
- inline Constituency of the National Assembly of France

- Location in French Polynesia
- Deputy: Mereana Reid Arbelot; Tavini Huiraatira
- Department: French Polynesia (overseas collectivity)
- Cantons: Windward Islands: communes of Faaa and Punaauia; Leeward Islands

French Polynesia's third constituency is a French legislative constituency in French Polynesia. It is represented by Mereana Reid Arbelot of Tavini Huiraatira.

It was created in the 2010 redistricting of French legislative constituencies, which came into application for the June 2012 legislative election. It consists of the communes of Faaa and Punaauia in Tahiti, and all communes in the Leeward Islands (Bora-Bora, Huahine, Maupiti, Tahaa, Taputapuatea, Tumaraa, Uturoa).

== Deputies ==
When the constituency was first contested during the 2012 elections, Jean-Paul Tuaiva, a business executive, was elected. He was supported by Tapura huiraatira, a right-of-centre and anti-independence party. He prevailed in the second round during a close contest, opposing him to Tauhiti Nena, a Cabinet Minister in the Temaru government.

In 2017, Tuaiva was embroiled in a misappropriation of public funds case and did not run for reelection. The election was a three-way race between Patrick Howell, supported by Tuaiva and a minister in the Fritch administration, Moetai Brotherson, a left-wing independentist and the step-son of Oscar Temaru, and Vincent Dubois, a former senator and a right-wing autonomist. The latter was eliminated in the first round and Brotherson prevailed in the second round in a somewhat less close race than that of 2012.

In 2022, Brotherson was reelected with a comfortable margin against his main opponent from Tapura, Tuterai Tumahai, a doctor. In 2023, following the victory of Tavini Huiraatira, Brotherson's party, during the legislative election, Moetai Brotherson was elected President of French Polynesia. Therefore, he resigned as deputy and was replaced by his substitute, Mereana Reid Arbelot.

Election	Member	Party
2012	Jean-Paul Tuaiva	Tapura
2017	Moetai Brotherson	Tavini
2022	Moetai Brotherson	Tavini
2023	Mereana Reid Arbelot	Tavini

== Election results ==
=== 2024 ===
2024 Legislative Election: French Polynesia's 3rd constituency

Candidate	Party	Alliance	First round		Second round	
Candidate	Party	Alliance	Votes	%	Votes	%
Mereana Reid Arbelot	FLP	NFP	12,483	42.71	17,308	50.87
Pascale Haiti	DVD		12,006	41.08	16,716	49.13
Naumi Mihuraa	DVD		3,230	11.05		
Jean-Yves Morel	ECO		1,507	5.16		
Valid votes			29,226	100.00	34,024	100.00
Blank votes			349	1.17	382	1.10
Null votes			226	0.76	250	0.72
Turnout			29,801	43.17	34,656	50.20
Abstentions			39,227	56.83	34,382	49.80
Registered voters			69,028		69,038	
Result			FLP HOLD			

=== 2022 ===
Legislative Election 2022: French Polynesia's 3rd constituency
Party	Candidate	Votes	%	±%
Tavini Huiraatira (NUPÉS)	Moetai Brotherson	9,761	34.26	+4.15
Tapura Huiraatira (Ensemble)	Tuterai Tumehai	9,128	32.04	-1.36
A here	Nuihau Laurey	4,140	14.53	N/A
Amuitahira'a o te Nuna'a Maohi (UDC)	Sylviane Terooatea	3,987	13.99	−13.58
DVE	Jules Hauata	586	2.06	N/A
Others	N/A	889	3.13	
Turnout		28,491	43.33	−0.22
2nd round result
Tavini Huiraatira (NUPÉS)	Moetai Brotherson	21,937	61.32	+8.82
Tapura Huiraatira (Ensemble)	Tuterai Tumehai	13,837	38.68	−8.82
Turnout		35,774	54.62	+3.87
Tavini Huiraatira hold				

=== 2017 ===
Candidate	Label	First round		Second round	
Candidate	Label	Votes	%	Votes	%
Patrick Howell	Tapura	9,195	33.40	15,020	47.50
Moetai Brotherson	Tavini	8,291	30.11	16,603	52.50
Vincent Dubois	Tahoera'a	7,592	27.57		
Albert Roi	DVG	1,008	3.66		
Astride Mara	FI	513	1.86		
Teiva Lanteires	FN	333	1.21		
Corinne Atger	DIV	308	1.12		
Dominique Tixier	DIV	293	1.06		
Votes		27,533	100.00	31,623	100.00
Valid votes		27,533	97.54	31,623	96.71
Blank votes		430	1.52	616	1.88
Null votes		264	0.94	459	1.40
Turnout		28,227	43.55	32,698	50.75
Abstentions		36,587	56.45	31,727	49.25
Registered voters		64,814		64,425	
Source: Ministry of the Interior

=== 2012 ===
2012 legislative election in Polynesie-Francaise's 3rd constituency
Candidate	Party	First round		Second round	
Candidate	Party	Votes	%	Votes	%
Tauhiti Nena	DVG	8,545	30.52%	15,699	49.76%
Jean-Paul Tuaiva	DVD	6,692	23.90%	15,851	50.24%
Gaston Tong Sang	UMP	4,604	16.45%		
Teva Rohfritsch	PR	2,793	9.98%		
Jean-Christophe Bouissou	DVD	1,762	6.29%		
John Tefan	DVD	878	3.14%		
Nicolas Bertholon	DVD	637	2.28%		
Taimana Ellacott	??	595	2.13%		
Gaston Tetuanui	??	379	1.35%		
Angèle Teriitau	EELV	346	1.24%		
Eric Minardi	FN	327	1.17%		
Monil Tetuanui	DVG	206	0.74%		
Daniel Tuahu	DVD	113	0.40%		
René Hoffer	??	108	0.39%		
Teriiorai Oopa	DVD	10	0.04%		
Valid votes		27,995	98.23%	31,550	96.35%
Spoilt and null votes		503	1.77%	1,195	3.65%
Votes cast / turnout		28,498	47.34%	32,745	54.90%
Abstentions		31,696	52.66%	26,900	45.10%
Registered voters		60,194	100.00%	59,645	100.00%
