= French Polynesia's 2nd constituency =

Constituency of the French Fifth Republic

2nd constituency of French Polynesia
- inline Constituency of the National Assembly of France

- Location in French Polynesia
- Deputy: Steve Chailloux; Tavini Huiraatira
- Department: French Polynesia (overseas collectivity)
- Cantons: Windward Islands: communes of Hitiaa O Te Ra, Mahina, Paea, Papara, Taiarapu-Est, Taiarapu-Ouest, Teva I Uta; Austral Islands

French Polynesia's 2nd constituency is a French legislative constituency in French Polynesia. It is currently represented by Nicole Sanquer of A here ia Porinetia.

Following the 2010 redistricting of French legislative constituencies, which came into application for the June 2012 legislative election, the boundaries of French Polynesia's two constituencies were redrawn so as to create a third constituency in the collectivity. Since then, the 2nd constituency consists of the communes of Hitiaa O Te Ra, Mahina, Paea, Papara, Taiarapu-Est, Taiarapu-Ouest and Teva I Uta in the Windward Islands, and all communes in the Austral Islands (Raivavae, Rapa, Rimatara, Rurutu, Tubuai).

== Deputies ==
Election	Member	Party
1988	Émile Vernaudon	SE
1993	Gaston Flosse	RPR
1997	Émile Vernaudon	RPR
2002	Beatrice Vernaudon	UMP
2007	Bruno Sandras	UMP
2012	Jonas Tahuaitu	Tahoera'a
2017	Nicole Sanquer	Tahoera'a
2020	Nicole Sanquer	A here
2022	Steve Chailloux	Tavini

== Election results ==
=== 2024 ===
Candidate	Party	Alliance	First round		Second round	
Candidate	Party	Alliance	Votes	%	Votes	%
Nicole Sanquer	A here	DVC	12,986	49.09	17,838	55.88
Steve Chailloux	FLP	NUPÉS	11,162	42.19	14,086	44.12
Tutu Tetuanuii	RN		1,240	4.69		
Tati Salmon	ECO	NFP	1,047	3.96		
Jules Tehuiarii Tara	DVD		19	0.7		
Valid votes			26,454	98.59	31,924	98.52
Blank votes			208	0.78	241	0.74
Null votes			171	0.64	238	0.73
Turnout			26,833	38.75	32,403	46.79
Abstentions			42,412	61.25	36,854	5.21
Registered voters			69,245		69,257	
Result			A here gain from Tāpura Huiraʻatira			

=== 2022 ===
Legislative Election 2022: French Polynesia's 2nd constituency
Party	Candidate	Votes	%	±%
Tapura Huiraatira (Ensemble)	Tepuaraurii Teriitahi*	8,660	33.21	-17.47
Tavini Huiraatira (NUPÉS)	Steve Chailloux	7,506	28.78	+9.21
A here	Nicole Sanquer**	4,548	17.44	N/A
Amuitahira'a o te Nuna'a Maohi (UDC)	Jonathan Tarihaa	3,300	12.65	−11.41
DIV	Sandra Manutahi Levy-Agami	567	2.17	N/A
RN	Charles Atger	562	2.15	+1.30
Others	N/A	936	3.59	
Turnout		26,079	39.43	−1.60
2nd round result
Tavini Huiraatira (NUPÉS)	Steve Chailloux	19,977	58.89	N/A
Tapura Huiraatira (Ensemble)	Tepuaraurii Teriitahi	13,947	41.11	−23.17
Turnout		33,924	51.53	+6.53
Tavini Huiraatira gain from Amuitahira'a o te Nuna'a Maohi				

* The swing for Tapura Huiraatira includes the 2017 results of Nicole Sanquer, the then Tapura Huiraatira candidate, and the results of LREM, who now supported the party as part of the Ensemble Citoyens alliance.

** Sanquer previously stood for Tapura Huiraatira, before founding A here ia Porinetia. As such, her previous results are counted in the swing for the Tapura Huiraatira candidate.

=== 2017 ===
Candidate	Label	First round		Second round	
Candidate	Label	Votes	%	Votes	%
Nicole Sanquer	Tapura	10,085	37.60	18,282	64.18
Teura Iriti	Tahoera'a	6,453	24.06	10,204	35.82
Valentina Hina dite Tina Ebb Épse Cross	Tavini	4,644	17.32		
Tepuaraurii Teriitahi	REM	3,508	13.08		
Faana Taputu	DVG	701	2.61		
Maire Grandin	FI	356	1.33		
Tati Salmon	ECO	274	1.02		
Tom Tefaaroa	DVD	264	0.98		
Miri Dubief	FN	254	0.95		
Yves Conroy	DIV	142	0.53		
Pascal Pique	DIV	138	0.51		
Votes		26,819	100.00	28,486	100.00
Valid votes		26,819	98.00	28,486	94.89
Blank votes		271	0.99	548	1.83
Null votes		276	1.01	987	3.29
Turnout		27,366	41.03	30,021	45.00
Abstentions		39,339	58.97	36,685	55.00
Registered voters		66,705		66,706	
Source: Ministry of the Interior

=== 2012 ===
2012 legislative election in Polynesie-Francaise's 2nd constituency
Candidate	Party	First round		Second round	
Candidate	Party	Votes	%	Votes	%
Jonas Tahuaitu	DVD	7,529	29.18%	16,413	53.42%
Philippe Neuffer		6,281	24.34%	14,310	46.58%
Teiva Manutahi	DLR	2,654	10.28%		
Bruno Sandras	UMP	2,435	9.44%		
Tearii Alpha	DVD	1,954	7.57%		
Sandra Levy-Agami	DVD	1,303	5.05%		
Manea Tuahu	DVD	909	3.52%		
Clarenntz Vernaudon	DVD	672	2.60%		
Antonio Perez	DVD	512	1.98%		
Jimmy Panie	DVD	398	1.54%		
Hinano Tunoa	??	371	1.44%		
Antonio Soares-Pires	DVD	302	1.17%		
Jaros Otcenasek	EELV	297	1.15%		
Edouard Poroi	??	188	0.73%		
Valid votes		25,805	98.11%	30,723	97.12%
Spoilt and null votes		498	1.89%	911	2.88%
Votes cast / turnout		26,303	44.21%	31,634	53.19%
Abstentions		33,188	55.79%	27,844	46.81%
Registered voters		59,491	100.00%	59,478	100.00%
