= 2024 French legislative election in French Polynesia =

Following the first round of the 2024 French legislative election on 30 June 2024, runoff elections in each constituency where no candidate received a vote share greater than 50 percent were scheduled for 7 July. Candidates permitted to stand in the runoff elections needed to either come in first or second place in the first round or achieve more than 12.5 percent of the votes of the entire electorate (as opposed to 12.5 percent of the vote share due to low turnout).

== French Polynesia ==
=== 1st constituency ===
Candidate	Party or alliance		Votes	%
Moerani Frébault	Ensemble	Tāpura Huiraʻatira	18,456	53.85
Tematai Le Gayic	New Popular Front	Tāvini Huiraʻatira	12,243	35.72
James Heaux	National Rally		2,168	6.33
Jacky Bryant	Ecologists	Independent	1,404	4.10
Total			34,271	100.00
Valid votes			34,271	98.62
Invalid votes			204	0.59
Blank votes			277	0.80
Total votes			34,752	100.00
Registered voters/turnout			73,776	47.10

=== 2nd constituency ===
Candidate	Party or alliance		First round		Second round	
Candidate	Party or alliance		Votes	%	Votes	%
Nicole Sanquer	Miscellaneous right	A here ia Porinetia	12,986	49.09	17,838	55.88
Steve Chailloux	New Popular Front	Tāvini Huiraʻatira	11,162	42.19	14,086	44.12
Tutu Tetuanui	National Rally		1,240	4.69		
Tati Salmon	Ecologists	Independent	1,047	3.96		
Jules Tehuiarii	Miscellaneous right	Independent	19	0.07		
Total			26,454	100.00	31,924	100.00
Valid votes			26,454	98.59	31,924	98.52
Invalid votes			171	0.64	238	0.73
Blank votes			208	0.78	241	0.74
Total votes			26,833	100.00	32,403	100.00
Registered voters/turnout			69,245	38.75	69,257	46.79

=== 3rd constituency ===
Candidate	Party or alliance		First round		Second round	
Candidate	Party or alliance		Votes	%	Votes	%
Mereana Reid Aberlot	New Popular Front	Tāvini Huiraʻatira	12,483	42.71	17,308	50.87
Pascale Haiti Flosse	Miscellaneous right	Independent	12,006	41.08	16,716	49.13
Naumi Mihuraa	Miscellaneous right	Independent	3,230	11.05		
Jules Hauata	Ecologists	Independent	1,507	5.16		
Total			29,226	100.00	34,024	100.00
Valid votes			29,226	98.07	34,024	98.18
Invalid votes			226	0.76	250	0.72
Blank votes			349	1.17	382	1.10
Total votes			29,801	100.00	34,656	100.00
Registered voters/turnout			69,028	43.17	69,038	50.20
