= Putai Taae =

French Polynesian politician

Mayor of Papara
- In office 26 October 2015 – 7 May 2019
- Preceded by: Christelle Lehartel
- Succeeded by: Gaston Tunoa

Member of the French Polynesian Assembly for Windward Isles 2
- In office 17 May 2018 – 30 April 2023
- In office 17 May 2013 – 15 August 2017

Personal details
- Born: 1961
- Party: Tahoera'a Huiraatira; Tapura Huiraatira; Tavini Huiraatira

Putai Taae (born 1961) is a French Polynesian politician and former Member of the Assembly of French Polynesia. He is a member of Tapura Huiraatira.

Taae first entered the Assembly of French Polynesia after the 2013 French Polynesian legislative election, as a replacement for Tearii Alpha who had been appointed to Cabinet. In May 2015 he joined Tapura Huiraatira. In October 2015 he was elected Mayor of Papara in a by-election after the 2014 Papara municipal elections were annulled by the French Council of State. He lost his seat in the Assembly in August 2017, when Nicole Sanquer left Cabinet after being elected to the French National Assembly. He was re-elected to the Assembly as a Tapura candidate at the 2018 election.

In April 2019 he was charged with breach of trust over the allocation of funds to a town association while mayor. In May 2019 he was convicted and sentenced to a suspended jail sentence, a US$20,000 fine, and banned from holding public office for 2 years. As a result he lost his position as Mayor, but stayed in the Assembly pending the resolution of his appeal. In November 2021 the conviction was upheld on appeal, and he was resentenced to an identical sentence. Taae appealed the sentence again, and so retained his seat in the Assembly. In December 2021 the Papara municipal council was informed that Taae was being investigated for abuse of office while mayor.

In September 2022 he briefly joined Tavini Huiraatira, but returned to the Tapura in December after opposition from Tavini activists. He was not re-elected at the 2023 election
