= Tepuaraurii Teriitahi =

French Polynesian politician

Member of the French Polynesian Assembly for Windward Isles 2
- Incumbent
- Assumed office 6 May 2018

Personal details
- Born: 1 December 1977 (age 48) Paea, French Polynesia
- Party: Tāpura Huiraʻatira

Tepuaraurii Marcella Teriitahi (born 1 December 1977) is a French Polynesian politician and Member of the Assembly of French Polynesia. Since 2018 she has been president of the Tāpura Huiraʻatira group in the Assembly.

== Early life ==
Teriitahi was born in Paea, French Polynesia, from a family historically settled in the town. After studying law, she became a teacher. Then in 1999, she became a customs officer and became involved as a staff representative and member of a union.

== Political career ==
Teriitahi was elected a municipal councilor in Paea on the list of former mayor Jacquie Graffe in the 2014 municipal elections.

In the 2017 French legislative election she was a candidate for French Polynesia's 2nd constituency. While a member of the Tapura, she stood against official Tapura candidate Nicole Sanquer. She placed 4th, with 13.08% of the vote.

She was elected to the Assembly of French Polynesia at the 2018 French Polynesian legislative election within the 2nd Windward Islands section. In June 2018, following the election of Sylvana Puhetini as second vice-president of the Assembly she was elected as President of the Tapura group in the Assembly.

In the 2020 municipal elections she headed the Tapura list in Paea in the second round, following the death of Mayor Jacquie Graffe. In June, a month after the announcement, she received homophobic insults from a surfer. The Tapura lost the mayoralty, retaining only 7 seats against 25 for the Tavini, and tipping the Tapura into the opposition.

At the 2022 French legislative election she was the Tapura candidate for the 2nd constituency. While she led in the first round, with 33.24% of the vote, she was defeated in the second round by the Tavini's Steve Chailloux.

She was re-elected to the Assembly at the 2023 election.
