= Yseult Butcher =

French Polynesian politician

Mayor of Hao
- Incumbent
- Assumed office 16 March 2020
- Preceded by: Théodore Tuahine

Member of the French Polynesian Assembly for East Tuamotu and Gambiers
- Incumbent
- Assumed office 6 May 2018

Personal details
- Born: 1968
- Party: Tahoera'a Huiraatira; Tāpura Huiraʻatira

Yseult Butcher-Ferry (born 1968) is a French Polynesian businesswoman, politician, and Member of the Assembly of French Polynesia who has served as Mayor of Hao since 2020. She is a member of Tāpura Huiraʻatira.

She was first elected to the Assembly of French Polynesia at the 2018 French Polynesian legislative election as a candidate for Tahoera'a Huiraatira. At the 2020 municipal elections, she was elected Mayor of Hao, defeating incumbent Théodore Tuahine.

In September 2020, she resigned from the Tahoera'a and joined Tāpura Huiraʻatira. She ran as a Tapura candidate in the 2023 election and was re-elected.
