= Steve Chailloux =

French Polynesian politician

Member of the French Polynesian Assembly for Windward Isles 2
- Incumbent
- Assumed office 30 April 2023

Member of the French National Assembly for French Polynesia's 2nd constituency
- Incumbent
- Assumed office 18 June 2022
- Preceded by: Nicole Sanquer

Personal details
- Born: Papeete, French Polynesia
- Party: Tavini Huiraatira; New Ecologic and Social People's Union

Steve Chailloux is a French Polynesian politician and member of the French National Assembly. He is a member of Tavini Huiraatira, and sits with the New Ecologic and Social People's Union in the National Assembly.

Chailloux was born in Papeete and grew up in Faaa and Papeari. He studied at the University of French Polynesia before moving to the Sorbonne and the School for Advanced Studies in the Social Sciences, graduating in 2009. He then moved to the University of Hawaiʻi, where he taught Reo Tahiti for ten years. After returning to Tahiti in 2017, he taught Reo Tahiti to local students.

Having previously supported autonomist parties, he joined Tavini Huiraatira in 2013. He worked as a parliamentary attache to National Assembly member Moetai Brotherson. In the 2020 French Polynesian municipal elections he was elected a town Councillor in Teva I Uta.

He was elected to the French National Assembly in the 2022 French legislative election, defeating Tapura Huiraatira's Tepuaraurii Teriitahi.

He was elected to the Assembly of French Polynesia in the 2023 election.
