= Lana Tetuanui =

French politician

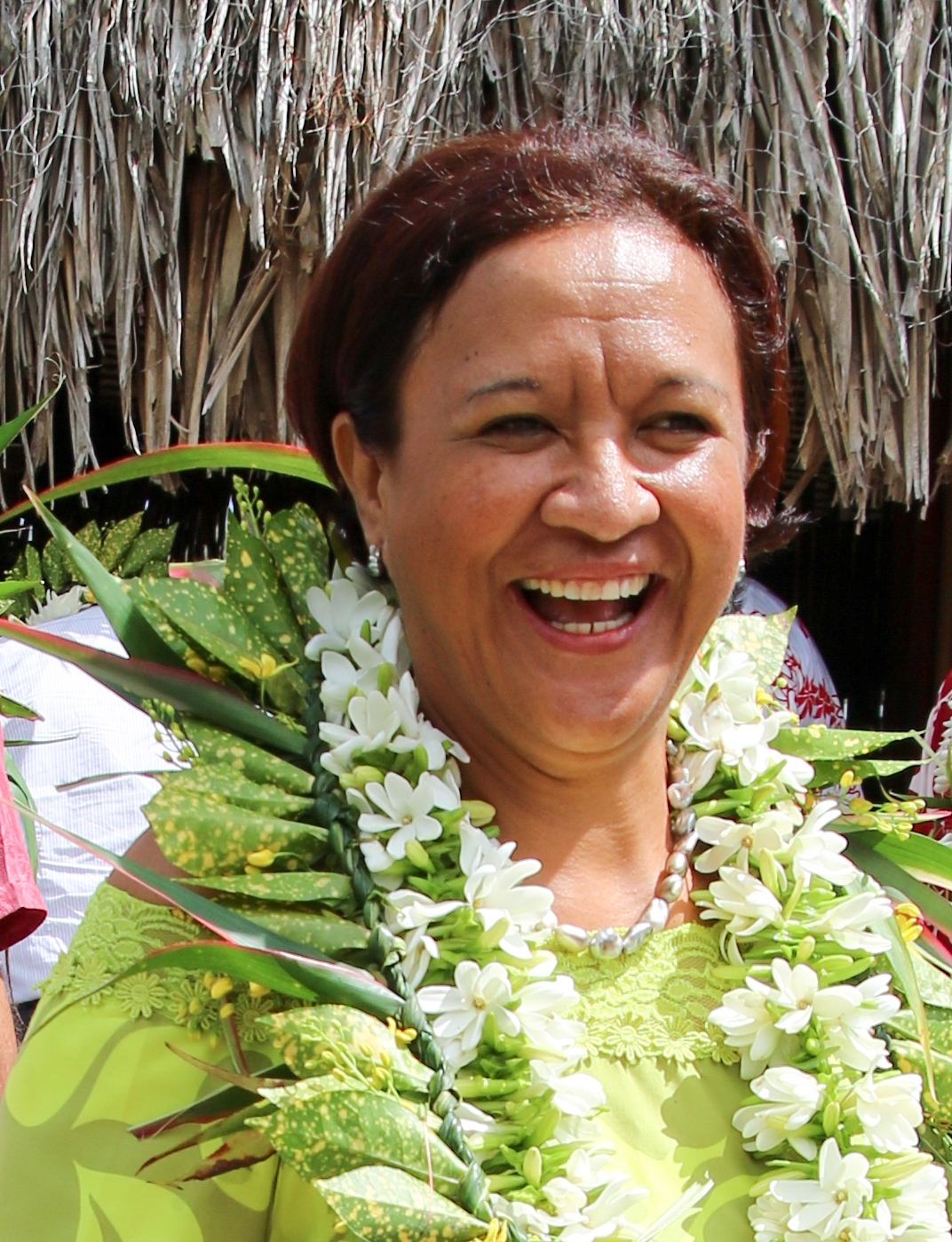
- Tetuanui in 2017

Senator for French Polynesia
- Incumbent
- Assumed office 3 May 2015
- Preceded by: Teura Iriti

1st Vice President of the Assembly of French Polynesia
- In office 18 September 2014 – 21 September 2017

Personal details
- Born: Lana Hunter; February 23, 1970 (age 56) Uturoa, French Polynesia
- Party: Tapura Huiraatira (since 2016)
- Other political affiliations: Tahoeraa Huiraatira (until 2015)
- Domestic partner: Cyril Tetuanui
- Occupation: Hostess

Lana Tetuanui (née Hunter, 23 February 1970) is a French politician who has served as a Senator for French Polynesia since 2015. A member of Tapura Huiraatira, she has been elected to the Assembly of French Polynesia since 2001.

== Career ==
Tetuanui was born in Uturoa, on the island of Raiatea. Her husband Cyril Tetuanui has been Mayor of Tumaraa since the 2008 municipal election.

In 2001, she was elected to the Assembly of French Polynesia for the Leeward Islands on the list led by Oscar Temaru. She became an ally of Gaston Flosse, serving as a cabinet minister from 2008 to 2011. A member of Tahoeraa Huiraatira, she became 1st Vice President of the Assembly in 2014, working with Édouard Fritch, elected President of French Polynesia that year. In 2015, she was elected to the Senate alongside Nuihau Laurey, against the candidates presented by Flosse. She was expelled from her party, founding Tapura Huiraatira in 2016, which would go on to win a majority in the 2018 legislative election.

In September 2020 she was reelected to the Senate alongside fellow Tapura Huiraatira candidate Teva Rohfritsch.

She was re-elected to the Assembly in the 2023 election.
