= Tahuhu Maraeura =

French Polynesian politician

Mayor of Rangiroa
- Incumbent
- Assumed office 30 April 2021
- Preceded by: Teina Maraeura

Member of the French Polynesian Assembly for West Tuamotu
- Incumbent
- Assumed office 11 May 2023

Personal details
- Born: 1971 or 1972 (age 53–54)
- Party: Tāpura Huiraʻatira

Tahuhu Maraeura (born 1971 or 1972) is a French Polynesian politician and Member of the Assembly of French Polynesia who has served as Mayor of Rangiroa since 2021. He is the son of politician Teina Maraeura, whom he replaced as mayor when he was convicted of corruption and made ineligible. He is a member of Tāpura Huiraʻatira.

He was elected to the Rangiroa council at the 2020 municipal elections, and elected first deputy. On 30 April 2021, he was elected mayor of Rangiroa, succeeding his father, who had been disqualified from office after being convicted of corruption.

He ran as a Tāpura candidate in the 2023 French Polynesian legislative election and was elected to the Assembly of French Polynesia.
