= Frédéric Riveta =

French Polynesian politician

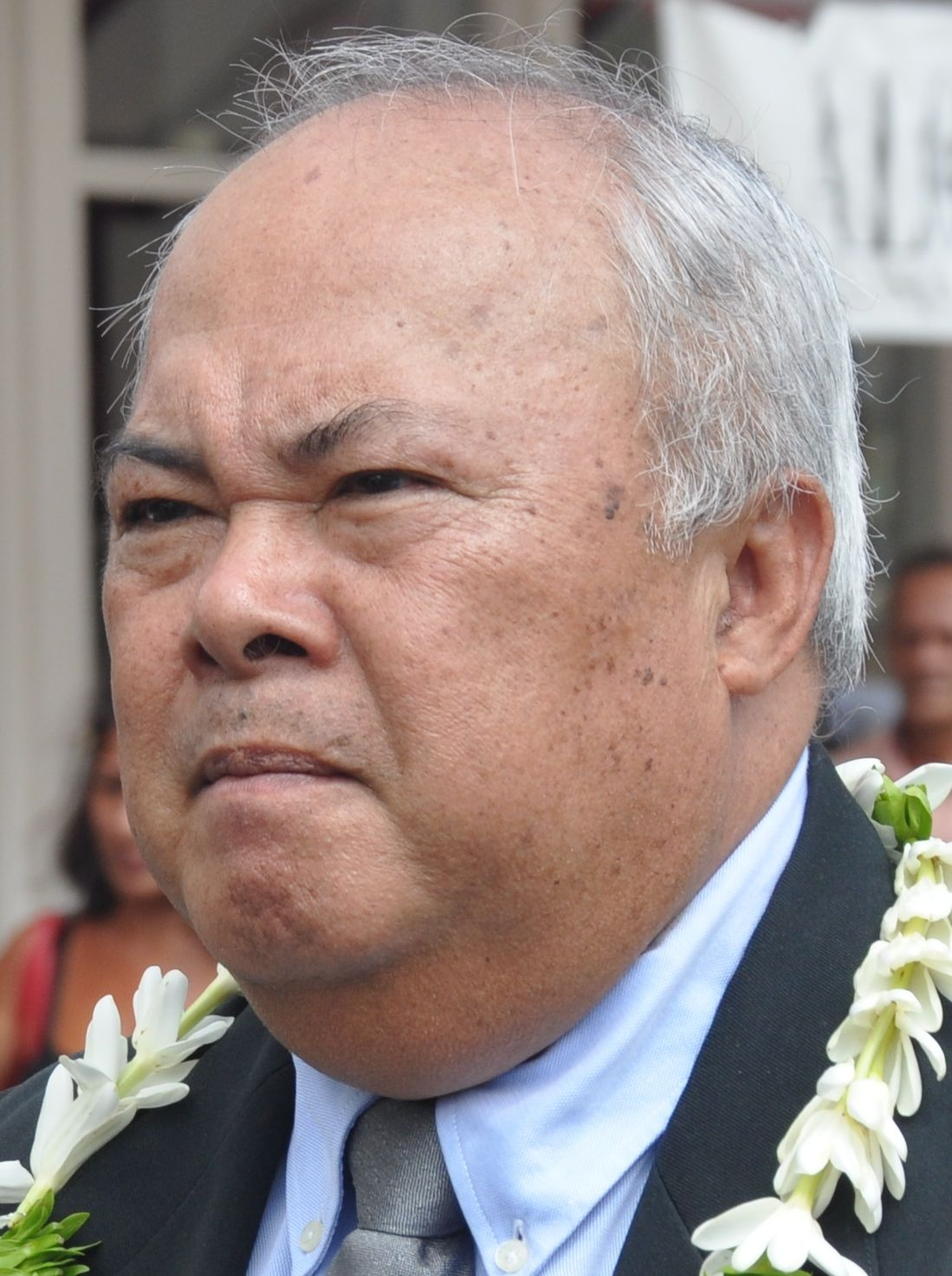
- Riveta in 2014

Minister of Agriculture and Island Development
- In office 16 September 2014 – 8 October 2015
- President: Édouard Fritch
- Preceded by: Thomas Moutame
- Succeeded by: Édouard Fritch

Mayor of Rurutu
- Incumbent
- Assumed office 1995

Member of the French Polynesian Assembly for Austral Islands
- Incumbent
- Assumed office 1996

Personal details
- Born: 19 July 1954 (age 71) Rurutu, French Polynesia
- Party: Tahoera'a Huiraatira; Tapura Huiraatira

Frédéric Riveta (born 19 July 1954) is a French Polynesian politician and former Cabinet Minister. He is a member of Tapura Huiraatira.

Riveta has been mayor of Rurutu since 1995. He was first elected to the Assembly of French Polynesia in the 1996 French Polynesian legislative election. He served as a Minister several times in the Flosse, Tong Sang and Temaru governments, holding the positions of Agriculture, Fisheries and Rural Economy.

On 1 March 2011 he was sacked from the government of Gaston Tong Sang for failing to support the budget. He was replaced as a Minister by Louis Frébault. He was re-elected to the Assembly at the 2013 election and elected third vice-president. In September 2014 he was appointed Minister of Agriculture and Island Development in the government of Édouard Fritch. In October 2015 he resigned from the executive and returned to the ranks of the Assembly to strengthen Fritch's majority, his substitute being a supporter of Gaston Flosse.

During the founding congress of the Tapura Huiraatira in 2016 he was elected one of the party's vice-presidents.

He was re-elected to the Assembly at the 2018 election. In 2020 he was re-elected for a fifth term as Mayor of Rurutu. He was re-elected to the Assembly in the 2023 election.
