= Mereana Reid Arbelot =

French politician from Tāvini Huiraʻatira

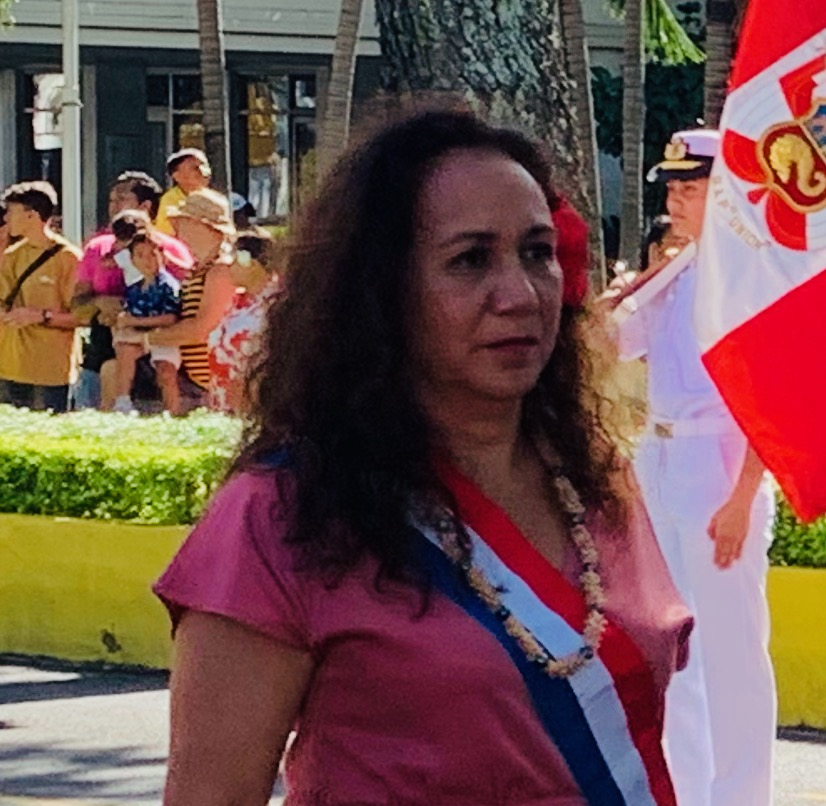
- Reid Arbelot in July 2023

Member of the National Assembly for French Polynesia's 3rd constituency
- Incumbent
- Assumed office 10 June 2023
- Preceded by: Moetai Brotherson

Personal details
- Born: 12 September 1970 (age 55) Papeete, French Polynesia
- Party: Tāvini Huiraʻatira

Mereana Reid Arbelot (born 28 July 1976) is a French politician from Tāvini Huiraʻatira who has represented French Polynesia's 3rd constituency in the National Assembly since 2023, when she replaced Moetai Brotherson who was elected President of French Polynesia.

== See also ==
- List of deputies of the 16th National Assembly of France
