= Ia Ora te Nuna'a =

Long Live the People Ia Ora te Nunaʻa
- President: Teva Rohfritsch
- Secretary-General: Manfred Chave
- Deputy President: Nicole Bouteau
- Founded: 2022
- Split from: Tāpura Huiraʻatira
- Ideology: French Polynesian autonomy Anti-independence
- Regional affiliation: Amui Tatou
- Colours: Blue and yellow
- National Assembly (French Polynesian seats): 0 / 3
- Senate (French Polynesian seats): 1 / 2
- Assembly of French Polynesia: 0 / 57

Ia Ora te Nunaʻa (lit. 'Long Live the People') is an autonomist political party in French Polynesia. The party was founded in December 2022 by Teva Rohfritsch and Nicole Bouteau.

The party was formed after Rohfritsch and Bouteau resigned from the ruling Tāpura Huiraʻatira citing dissatisfaction with the government of Edouard Fritch. It was officially launched on 8 December 2022. Rohfritsch and Bouteau were joined by Teura Tarahu-Atuahiva in the Assembly, as well as by former Assembly President Marcel Tuihani. The objectives of the party are autonomy (as opposed to independence) for French Polynesia, social justice, protection of the environment, and decentralisation. The party intends to contest the 2023 elections.

In January 2023 Marcel Tuihani quit the party, saying that it was not organised enough to contest the election.

The party came fifth in the first round of the 2023 French Polynesian legislative election, with 4.36% of the vote. It subsequently called on its voters to vote for either of the autonomist parties in the second round.

== Election results ==
=== Territorial elections ===
Year	1st round			2nd round			Seats
Year	Votes	%	Place	Votes	%	Place	Seats
2023	5,423	4.36	5th				
