= Benoît Kautai =

French Polynesian politician

Mayor of Nuku Hiva
- Incumbent
- Assumed office 2002
- Preceded by: Lucien Kimitete

Member of the French Polynesian Assembly for Marquesas Islands
- Incumbent
- Assumed office 6 May 2018

Member of the French Polynesian Assembly for Marquesas Islands
- In office 29 January 2008 – 4 May 2013

Personal details
- Born: 1960
- Party: Te Henua Enata a Tu; Union For Democracy; Tāpura Huiraʻatira

Benoît Kautai (born 1960) is a French Polynesian politician and Member of the Assembly of French Polynesia. He is currently mayor of Nuku Hiva. He is a member of Tāpura Huiraʻatira.

He was elected Mayor of Nuku Hiva in 2002 following the disappearance of Lucien Kimitete.

He was first elected to the Assembly of French Polynesia in the 2008 French Polynesian legislative election, on the Marquesan Te Henua Enata a Tu list, which advocated for the Marquesas Islands to be split from the rest of French Polynesia. He later abstained from the Assembly's 2011 vote to re-enter French Polynesia on the United Nations list of non-self-governing territories. He ran in the 2013 election as a candidate for the Union For Democracy (UPLD), but lost his seat.

In February 2016 he attended the founding congress of the Tāpura Huiraʻatira and was elected as one of the party's vice-presidents. He was re-elected to the Assembly as a Tāpura candidate in the 2018 election. Shortly after the election he was charged with abuse of public funds and fraud over a roading project in Nuku Hiva. In September 2018 he was convicted of both charges, fined US$50,000, and given a ten-month suspended prison sentence, but not disqualified from office. In December 2018 the French Polynesian government declined to seek damages from him.

He was re-elected as mayor of Nuku Hiva in May 2020. As mayor, he advocated for the Marquesas to become an "archipelago community" with autonomy within French Polynesia. He also advocated for the Marquesas to be listed as a World Heritage Site.

He was re-elected at the 2023 election.
