= Richard Tuheiava =

French Polynesian politician

Senator for French Polynesia
- In office 21 September 2008 – 30 September 2014
- Preceded by: None (Seat created)
- Succeeded by: Vincent Dubois

Member of the French Polynesian Assembly for Windward Isles 1
- Incumbent
- Assumed office 5 May 2013

Personal details
- Born: 28 February 1974 Papeete, French Polynesia
- Party: Union For Democracy; Socialist Party; Tavini Huiraatira

Richard Ari'ihau Tuheiava (born 28 February 1974) is a French Polynesian lawyer and politician. He represented French Polynesia in the Senate of France from 2008 to 2014, sitting with the Socialist Party. He is now a Member of the Assembly of French Polynesia and a member of Tavini Huiraatira.

== Early life ==
Tuheiava was born in Papeete and grew up in Raiatea and Moorea. He was educated at Lycée Paul-Gauguin before studying economics at the University of French Polynesia, graduating in 1993. He moved to Aix-en-Provence in France to study law, and in 1997 gained his legal degree. He returned to Tahiti in 1998, where he worked as a lawyer. He is a member of the Human Rights League, and served as president of the Junior Economic Chamber.

== Political career ==
In March 2008 he was elected a municipal councilor for Arue on the Union For Democracy (UPLD) list. In July 2008 he joined Tavini Huiraatira. In August 2008 he was chosen as the UPLD's candidate in the 2008 French Senate election, running on a joint opposition ticket with Tahoera'a Huiraatira leader Gaston Flosse. He was elected in the first round with 361 votes, becoming the youngest person elected to the French Senate. In the Senate he sat with the Socialist Party. Shortly after being elected he criticised the French government's plans for a nuclear compensation law as being aimed at evading responsibility. He repeated the criticism in 2010, pointing out that the law excluded compensation for contaminated land and failed to meet the needs and expectations of test victims. In May 2010 he complained to the French Prime Minister about the exclusion of a Tahitian delegation from a United Nations Special Committee on Decolonization meeting in New Caledonia. He later denounced the colonisation of French Polynesia by France and called the colonial era a dark period of humanity's history. In 2011 he called for France's nuclear compensation law to be amended to return the test sites of Moruroa and Fangataufa to French Polynesia. His bill to return the atolls was passed by the Senate in 2012, but had not yet been debated by the French National Assembly by the time it was meant to take effect in 2014. He contested the 2014 French Senate election for the UPLD, but lost to Vincent Dubois in the first round. Following the nullification of the 2014 Senate election he contested the resulting by-election, but was unsuccessful.

He was elected to the Assembly of French Polynesia on the UPLD list at the 2013 French Polynesian legislative election. He stood as a Tavini candidate in French Polynesia's 1st constituency at the 2017 French legislative election, but was eliminated in the first round. He was re-elected to the Assembly as a Tavini candidate in the 2018 election.

== Controversy ==
In November 2009 he was banned from practicing law for two years for taking money from clients without doing any work. The decision was upheld by the Court of Cassation in 2012.

In March 2012 he was charged with forgery over legal work he had done between 2006 and 2009. He denounced the charges as "a political move guided by Paris". The charges were dismissed in August 2012.
