= Joséphine Teakarotu =

French Polynesian politician (born 1969)

Member of the Assembly of French Polynesia
- In office 17 May 2018 – 30 April 2023
- Constituency: Gambier Islands and the Islands Tuamotu-East

Deputy Mayor of Rikitea
- In office April 2014 – December 2018

Personal details
- Born: 22 July 1969 (age 56)
- Party: Tāpura Huiraʻatira

Joséphine Teapiki Épse Teakarotu (born 22 July 1969) is a French Polynesian politician and oyster farmer who served in the Assembly of French Polynesia from 2018 until 2023. A member of the Tāpura Huiraʻatira party, she represented the eastern portion of the Îles Tuamotu-Gambier.

== Biography ==
Joséphine Teapiki Épse Teakarotu was born on 22 July 1969. Prior to entering French Polynesian politics, she worked as an oyster farmer, harvesting and selling the valuable pearls. In April 2014, Teakarotu was elected deputy mayor of the town of Rikitea. In this position, she held meetings with French Polynesian president Édouard Fritch during which they discussed development plans for the community, including the allocation of government land to construct sports facilities and the renovation of Mangareva Island's ring road. She resigned from office in December 2018.

Teakarotu was elected to the Assembly of French Polynesia in the 2018 election, representing the constituency of Gambier Islands and the Islands Tuamotu-East as a member of the autonomist Tāpura Huiraʻatira party. While in the assembly, she has served on the Commission for Equipment, Town Planning, Energy and Land and Maritime Transport; the Committee on Agriculture, Agrifood, Livestock and Archipelago Development; and the Standing Committee. She endorsed incumbent president Emmanuel Macron in the 2022 French presidential election.

Teakarotu ran for re-election in the 2023 French Polynesian legislative election, but was defeated.
