= Thomas Moutame =

French Polynesian politician

Mayor of Taputapuatea
- Incumbent
- Assumed office 1997
- Preceded by: Toni Hiro

Minister of Agriculture and Island Development
- In office 17 May 2013 – 16 September 2014
- President: Gaston Flosse
- Succeeded by: Frédéric Riveta

Minister of Outer Islands Development
- In office 18 February 2009 – 25 November 2009
- President: Oscar Temaru

Member of the French Polynesian Assembly for Leeward Isles
- Incumbent
- Assumed office 7 May 2013
- In office 23 May 2004 – 28 January 2008
- In office 12 May 1996 – 5 May 2001

Personal details
- Born: 1958 (age 67–68)
- Party: Tahoera'a Huiraatira; Tapura Huiraatira

Thomas Moutame is a French Polynesian politician and former Cabinet Minister. He has served as Mayor of Taputapuatea since 1997. He is a member of Tapura Huiraatira.

Moutame is from Raiatea. He was first elected to the Assembly of French Polynesia at the 1996 French Polynesian legislative election. He lost his seat at the 2001 election, but was re-elected in 2004. He lost his seat again at the 2008 election. In February 2009 he was appointed to the coalition cabinet of Oscar Temaru as Minister of Outer Islands Development. He later worked as a technical advisor to the Ministry of Rural Economy.

In 2007 while serving as Mayor of Taputapuatea he refused to marry a couple because one of them had had a sex change. In March 2011 he was convicted of abuse of power and fined US$5000. In September 2011 the Court of Appeal overturned an initial sentence of a year's ineligibility for office.

Following the 2013 election he was appointed to the Cabinet of Gaston Flosse as Minister of Agriculture and Island Development. After the fall of the Flosse government in September 2014 he returned to the Assembly. In December 2015 he voted for Édouard Fritch's budget rather than abstain with the rest of his party. He did the same in December 2016.

In April 2017 he was one of 22 Tahoeraa politicians jointly ordered to repay US$2.1 million of public funds they had misused to advance their political party between 1996 and 2004.

In February 2018 he left the Tahoeraa after failing to secure a high enough placing on the party list. He subsequently ran as a Tapura Huiraatira in the 2018 election and was elected. In 2020 he was re-elected as Mayor of Taputapuatea for a fifth term.
