= Henri Flohr =

French Polynesian politician

Mayor of Hitiaa O Te Ra
- Incumbent
- Assumed office 28 June 2020
- Preceded by: Dauphin Domingo
- In office 1989 – 31 March 2014
- Succeeded by: Dauphin Domingo

Member of the French Polynesian Assembly for Windward Isles 2
- Incumbent
- Assumed office 5 May 2013
- In office 17 March 1991 – 9 September 2003

Personal details
- Born: 1952 Huahine
- Party: Tahoera'a Huiraatira; Tāpura Huiraʻatira

Henri Flohr (born 1952) is a French Polynesian politician and Member of the Assembly of French Polynesia. He has served as Mayor of Hitiaa O Te Ra since 2014, having previously served from 1989 to 2008. Previously a member of Tahoera'a Huiraatira, he is now a member of Tāpura Huiraʻatira.

Flohr is originally from Huahine. He was elected Mayor of Hitiaa O Te Ra in 1989.

He was first elected to the Assembly of French Polynesia as a Tahoera'a candidate in the 1991 French Polynesian legislative election. In 2002 he was convicted of misuse of public funds and disqualified from office. Despite this, President of the Assembly Lucette Taero refused to remove him from the Assembly. He eventually resigned in September 2003, but the failure of authorities to remove him from office resulted in French High Commissioner Michel Mathieu being prosecuted for abuse of office.

He was re-elected to the Assembly as a Tahoera'a candidate in the 2013 election.

In the 2014 municipal elections he was comfortably re-elected as a councillor in the first round, but lost his seat (and the mayoralty) in the second. He organised a mass-resignation of Tahoera'a councillors, forcing new elections. and was re-elected as a councillor, but lost the mayoralty to Dauphin Domingo.

In June 2015 he resigned from the Tahoera'a group in the Assembly to join Édouard Fritch's Tāpura Huiraʻatira. He was re-elected to the Assembly as a Tāpura candidate in the 2018 election.

He led the Tāpura list in Hitiaa O Te Ra at the 2020 municipal elections. and was re-elected both as a councillor and as mayor.

He was re-elected to the Assembly at the 2023 election.
