= Teina Maraeura =

French Polynesian politician (1950–2023)

Mayor of Rangiroa
- In office 1986 – 14 April 2021
- Succeeded by: Tahuhu Maraeura

Minister of Culture
- In office 26 October 2004 – 3 March 2005
- President: Gaston Flosse

Member of the French Polynesian Assembly for West Tuamotu
- In office 6 May 2018 – 29 April 2023
- In office 16 March 1986 – 4 May 2013

Personal details
- Born: 11 August 1950 Tikehau, French Polynesia
- Died: 11 May 2023 (aged 72)
- Party: Tapura Napo des Tuamotu-Gambier; Tahoera'a Huiraatira; Te Mana o te Mau Motu; Tāpura Huiraʻatira

Teina Maraeura (11 August 1950 – 11 May 2023) was a French Polynesian politician and Cabinet minister who served as Mayor of Rangiroa from 1986 to 2021, when he was barred from office after being convicted of corruption.

== Biography ==
Maraeura was born in Tikehau in the Tuamotus and worked as a fisherman. He began his political career at the 1986 French Polynesian legislative election, when he was elected to the Assembly of French Polynesia as the second MP on the Tapura Napo des Tuamotu-Gambier list. Three months later he was elected mayor of Rangiroa.

Constantly re-elected as Mayor and to the Assembly, in October 2004 he was appointed Minister of Culture, in charge of the promotion of Polynesian languages in the government of Gaston Flosse. He lost the position in March 2005. In December 2005, he and Michel Yip left the Tahoera'a to become independents. In 2006, he served briefly as Minister of Outer Island Affairs.

In 2007 he founded Te niu hau manahune, the party of the islanders. Following the 2008 election he formed the Te Mana o te Mau Motu party of outer island MPs. The group was the cause of the frequent changes of the government of this period, changing allegiance to overthrow the Flosse government in 2008, the Temaru government in 2009, and then to return Temaru to power in 2011. He was not re-elected in the 2013 election but was re-elected as a Tāpura Huiraʻatira candidate in the 2018 election. He was subsequently elected second vice-president of the Assembly.

In 2005 he was appointed chair of the Archipelago Development Fund. He quit the position in October 2008 after being questioned for alleged corruption. In March 2015 he was convicted of corruption and disqualified from office for a year for abusing public funds as mayor.

On 14 April 2021, he was sentenced by the Papeete Criminal Court to one year in prison and one year suspended sentence, a fine of five million Pacific francs and five years of ineligibility in the Archipelago Development Fund case. Thus, he was automatically resigned from his functions as mayor of Rangiroa but retained his mandate as a representative in the Assembly, his conviction not being final. The conviction was overturned on appeal in October 2022.

His son Tahuhu Maraeura succeeded him as mayor on 30 April 2021.

Maraeura died on 11 May 2023, at age 72.
