= Heiura-Les Verts =

Political party in French Polynesia

- Leader: Jacky Bryant
- Founded: 1997
- Ideology: Green politics
- National affiliation: New Popular Front

Heiura-Les Verts is a green political party in French Polynesia. Established in 1997, the party is led by Jacky Bryant. It is unrepresented in the Assembly of French Polynesia.

In the 2004 French Polynesian legislative election it was part of the Union for Democracy (UPLD) coalition. In 2011 Jacky Bryant was Minister for the Environment in the coalition government of Oscar Temaru. It was part of the UPLD in the 2013 election.

In the 2018 territorial elections the party ran as part of the E Reo Manahune coalition with Tau Hotu rau.

In the 2022 French presidential election the party endorsed Yannick Jadot of Europe Ecology – The Greens. The party ran three candidates in the 2022 French legislative election, winning 2% of the vote in the first round. In the second round the party urged its supporters to vote against Tapura Huiraatira, and later endorsed Tavini Huiraatira.

On March 14, 2023 the party submitted its list for the 2023 French Polynesian legislative election. The party came last, with 2373 votes and 1.91 percent of the vote, and as a result endorsed Tāvini Huiraʻatira in the second round.
