= Moetai Brotherson =

President of French Polynesia since 2023

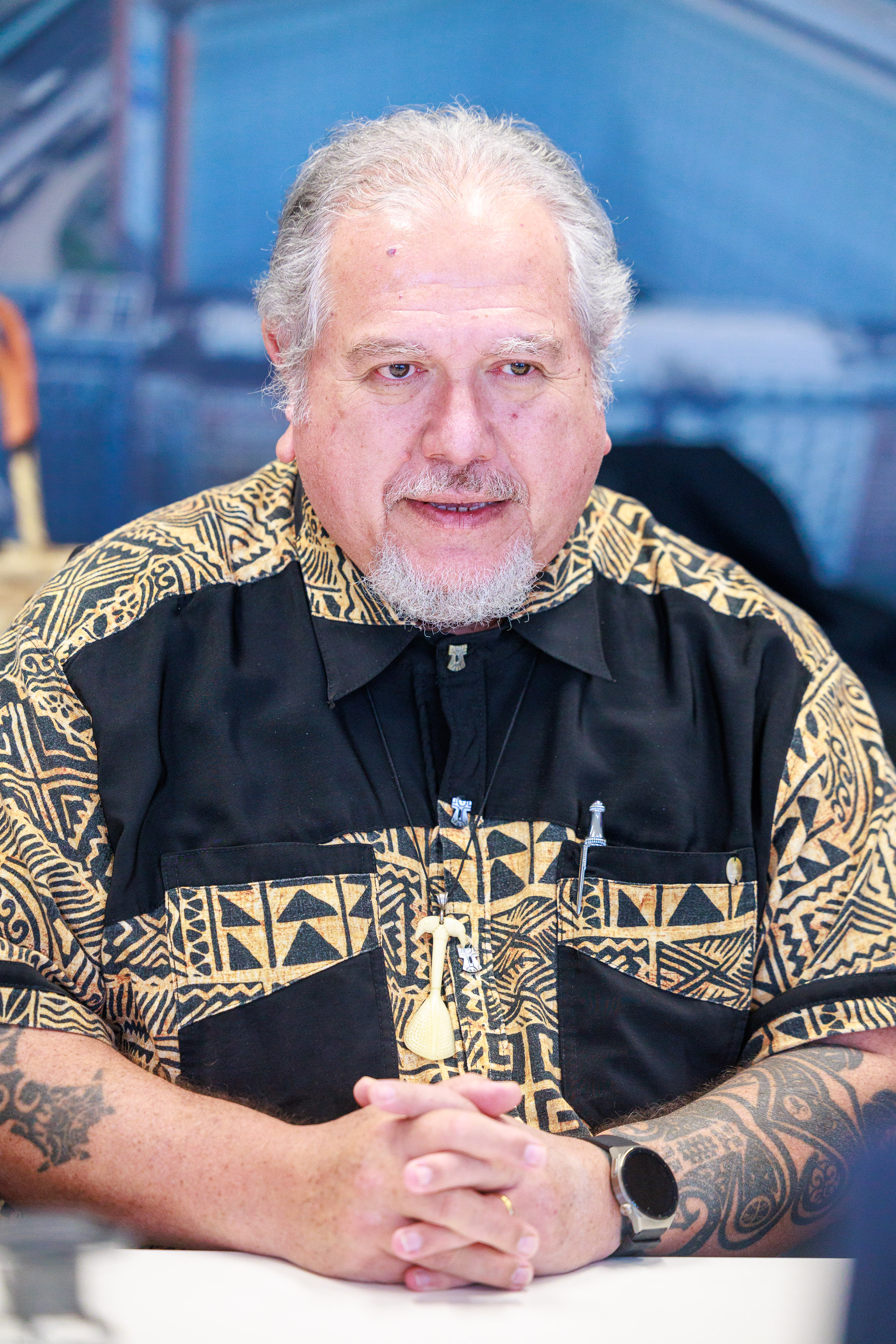
- Brotherson in 2025

18th President of French Polynesia
- Incumbent
- Assumed office 12 May 2023
- Vice President: Eliane Tevahitua; Chantal Galenon
- Preceded by: Édouard Fritch

Minister of Tourism
- Incumbent
- Assumed office 15 May 2023
- President: Himself
- Preceded by: Édouard Fritch

Member of the Assembly of French Polynesia
- In office 17 May 2018 – 12 May 2023
- Constituency: 3rd of the Windward Islands (2018–2023); Leeward Islands (2023)

Member of the National Assembly for French Polynesia's 3rd constituency
- In office 21 June 2017 – 9 June 2023
- Preceded by: Jean-Paul Tuaiva
- Succeeded by: Mereana Reid Arbelot

Personal details
- Born: Moetai Charles Brotherson; 22 October 1969 (age 56) Papeete, French Polynesia, France
- Party: Tāvini Huiraʻatira (2004–present)
- Education: École internationale des sciences du traitement de l'information
- Occupation: Computer engineer

Moetai Charles Brotherson (French pronunciation: [mɔetaj bʁɔzɛʁsɔn]; born 22 October 1969) is a French Polynesian politician who has served as President of French Polynesia since 12 May 2023.

He had previously represented French Polynesia's 3rd constituency in the French National Assembly from the 2017. A member of Tāvini Huiraʻatira, he had also served as a member of the Assembly of French Polynesia from 2018. Brotherson has been deputy leader of Tāvini Huiraʻatira since 2017 under the leadership of former President of French Polynesia Oscar Temaru.

Following the 2023 French Polynesian legislative election, Brotherson was elected President of French Polynesia by the Assembly of French Polynesia. He supports French Polynesia peacefully gaining independence from France through a local referendum possibly to be held in the 2030s. He is best known for his calm demeanour, representing his party's moderate wing.

== Early life ==
A native of Papeete, partly of Danish origin by his father, Brotherson grew up in Punaauia, Tahiti. He has biological and adoptive Tahitian parents. His biological parents lived in Huahine. Brotherson graduated from the École internationale des sciences du traitement de l'information in 1990 with a master's degree in computer science. He then worked in France, Japan, Germany and the United States before returning to Tahiti after the September 11 attacks. He had an appointment with Siemens in the Twin Towers on the day of the attacks.

In 2007 he published a novel, Le Roi absent ("The Absent King"). In 2010 he participated in the O Tahiti Nui Freedom expedition, which sailed a single-hulled Polynesian outrigger canoe from Tahiti to Shanghai.

== Political career ==
After returning to Tahiti, Brotherson worked as an advisor in the office of local politician Émile Vernaudon. He was head of the Post and Telecommunications department from 2005 to 2008, then chief of staff to Vice President of French Polynesia Antony Géros from 2011 to 2013. He later worked as opposition spokesperson.

He was elected as a municipal councillor of Faaa in the 2008 election, a position he held until 2020 under Mayor Oscar Temaru. In 2014 he became a deputy mayor, a position he held until 2017. Brotherson was elected to the French National Assembly in the 2017 legislative election, becoming the first Tāvini Huiraʻatira politician to serve in such a role. Despite trailing the Tāpura Huiraʻatira candidate in the first round, he won with 52.5% of the vote in the second round.

As a deputy, he became a member of the Democratic and Republican Left group. In his first appearance at the Palais Bourbon, he wore traditional Polynesian lavalava clothing. He unsuccessfully promoted a bill seeking lifetime disqualification from office for politicians convicted of corruption and advocated for French Polynesian independence. He also called on the Government of France to clean up its nuclear weapons test site at Moruroa and to compensate test victims.

He was subsequently elected to the Assembly of French Polynesia for the Windward Islands in the 2018 French Polynesian legislative election.

Brotherson was re-elected to the French National Assembly in the 2022 legislative election with 61.3% of the second-round vote under the New Ecological and Social People's Union (NUPES) alliance.

On 10 March 2023 Tāvini Huiraʻatira announced that Brotherson would be their candidate for the presidency following the 2023 French Polynesian legislative election. Tāvini Huiraʻatira was the largest party in the election; he was re-elected to the Assembly. On 12 May 2023 he was elected President of French Polynesia, defeating outgoing President Édouard Fritch 38 votes to 16, with 3 votes for Nicole Sanquer.

He appointed his government the following 15 May, tasking himself with tourism, international air transport, territories equality, international affairs, archipelagos development, the digital economy and the consequences of nuclear tests. Brotherson appointed Eliane Tevahitua as the first female Vice President of French Polynesia in history. He resigned from the French National Assembly, where he was succeeded by his substitute Mereana Reid Arbelot.

In interviews after his election, Brotherson stated his support for an independence referendum, but estimated the timetable could take up to 10–15 years. He stated that the first step was to define the electorate eligible to vote in the referendum. In the meantime, he assured France of his "respect" for the established order. On 7 June 2023, he met President of France Emmanuel Macron for the first time as President of French Polynesia. He called himself a "a courteous, but very determined man".
