= Tapeta Tetopata =

Tahitian politician (1954–2021)

Assembly Member for Windward isles 2
- In office 17 May 2018 – 22 March 2021
- Succeeded by: Maeva Bourgade

Personal details
- Born: 16 January 1954
- Died: 22 March 2021 (aged 67)
- Party: Tapura Huiraatira

Tapeta Tetopata (16 January 1954 – 22 March 2021) was a French Polynesian politician. She was a member of Tapura Huiraatira.

== Biography ==
Tetopata was born in Teahupoo, French Polynesia. In 1998 she was elected to the Taiarapu-Ouest municipal council, and in 2017 she became the first deputy mayor of the council.

In 2018 she was elected to the Assembly of French Polynesia as a representative for the Windward Islands.

Tetopata died in March 2021 after an illness. She was replaced as an MP by Maeva Bourgade.
