= Michel Leboucher =

French Polynesian politician

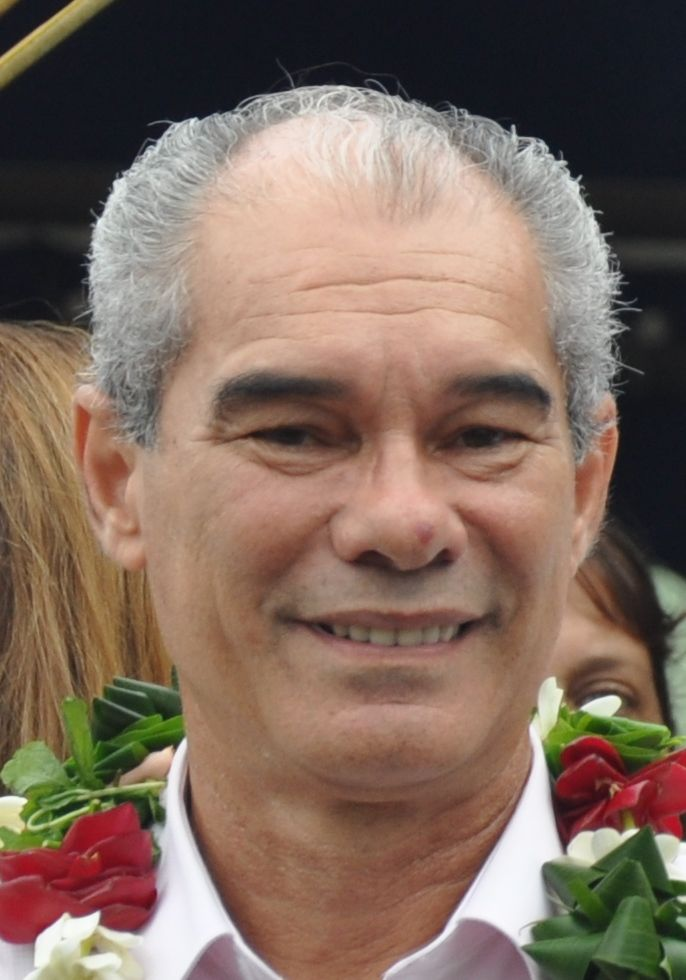
- Leboucher in 2014

Minister of Education, Youth and Sports
- In office 17 May 2013 – 5 September 2014
- President: Gaston Flosse
- Succeeded by: Nicole Sanquer

Member of the French Polynesian Assembly for Windward Isles 3
- In office 17 May 2013 – 16 May 2018

Personal details
- Born: 1956 (age 69–70) Papeete
- Party: Tahoera'a Huiraatira

Michel Leboucher (born 1956) is a French Polynesian politician and former Cabinet Minister. He is a member of Tahoera'a Huiraatira.

Leboucher is the son of former Territorial Assembly secretary René Leboucher, and the brother of politician Patrick Leboucher. He began his career as a teacher in Catholic education. He was diocesan director of Catholic education in French Polynesia from 1993 to 2014. He failed to win a seat in the Assembly of French Polynesia at the 2013 French Polynesian legislative election, but was eligible in the event of a Ministerial withdrawal. He was subsequently appointed to the cabinet of Gaston Flosse as Minister of Education, Youth and Sports. Following the fall of the Flosse government in September 2014 he returned to the Assembly. He ran as a Tahoera'a candidate in the 2018 election, but failed to win a seat.
