= List of senators of French Polynesia =

Location of French Polynesia in France

Following is a list of senators of French Polynesia, people who have represented the overseas country of French Polynesia in the French Senate.

French Polynesia is allocated two seats in the Senate. Since 2026 its senators have been Lana Tetuanui and Édouard Fritch.

== Fourth Republic ==
Senators for Oceania (Océanie) under the French Fourth Republic were:

- Joseph Quesnot (1946-1949) died in office
- Robert Lassalle-Sere (1949–1953)
- Jean Florisson (1953–1958)

== Fifth Republic ==
Senators for French Polynesia under the French Fifth Republic were (current senators italicised):

Name	Period	Party
Gérald Coppenrath	1959–1962	Union tahitienne démocratique (UTD), then UTD-UNR
Alfred Poroï	1962–1971	Union tahitienne (UT)
Pouvanaa Oopa Tetuaapua	1971–1977	Pupu Here Aia
Daniel Millaud	1977–1998	E'a Api (1977–1989) then Te E'a No Maohi Nui
Gaston Flosse	1998–2014	Tahoera'a Huiraatira (coalition UDSP in 2008)
Richard Tuheiava	2008–2014	Tavini Huiraatira (coalition UDSP)
Vincent Dubois	2014–2015	Tahoera'a Huiraatira
Teura Iriti	2014–2015	Tahoera'a Huiraatira
Lana Tetuanui	From 2015	Tapura Huiraatira
Nuihau Laurey	2015-2020	Tapura Huiraatira
Teva Rohfritsch	From 2020	Tapura Huiraatira

== Sources ==
- Liste des anciens sénateurs de la IVème République par circonscription (in French), Sénat de France
- Liste des anciens sénateurs de la Vème République par circonscription (in French), Sénat de France
- Liste par département – French Polynesia (in French), Sénat de France
