= Félix Tokoragi =

French Polynesian politician

Member of the French Polynesian Assembly for Tuamotu Est et Gambiers
- Incumbent
- Assumed office 17 May 2018

Personal details
- Party: Tapura Huiraatira; A here ia Porinetia; Independent

Félix Tokoragi is a French Polynesian politician and Member of the Assembly of French Polynesia. He has served as Mayor of Makemo since 2014.

He was elected to the Mekemo town council in 2014 and subsequently elected mayor.

In December 2017 Tokoragi handcuffed a man who had attacked him to an entrance post outside the town hall while waiting for police. In November 2021 he was fined XPF 100,000 for violence by a person holding public authority for the offence.

He was re-elected as Mayor in May 2020.

He was first elected to the Assembly of French Polynesia in the 2018 French Polynesian legislative election as a Tapura Huiraatira representative. He later split from Tapura Huiraatira and allied with Nuihau Laurey and Nicole Sanquer to form A here ia Porinetia.
