= Oceania Boxing Confederation =

The Oceania Boxing Confederation (OCBC) is the Oceania governing body in amateur boxing. It is a member of the world governing body IBA. It came into existence on the adoption of its constitution on February 16, 2009, taking over the functions of the former Oceania Amateur Boxing Association (OABA). The Oceania Boxing Confederation is responsible for overseeing amateur boxing within the Oceania region. Oceania is one of five regional confederations throughout the world. It is made up of 17 nations within the Oceania region.

The current president of the OCBC is Mr. Tauhiti Nena (President of the Polynesian Boxing Association). There are two vice-presidents and six executive committee members.

== Events ==
- Oceanian Amateur Boxing Championships
