= Vincent Dubois (politician) =

French Polynesian politician

Senator for French Polynesia
- In office 28 September 2014 – 5 February 2015

Personal details
- Born: 5 August 1981 (age 45) Cannes, France
- Party: Tahoera'a Huiraatira

Vincent Dubois (born 5 August 1981) is a French Polynesian lawyer and politician who represented French Polynesia in the Senate of France from 2014 to 2015. He is the son-in-law of Tahoera'a Huiraatira leader Gaston Flosse.

== Education and career ==
Dubois was born in Cannes. He spent his childhood and adolescence in Tahiti, then studied in metropolitan France, in Paris, in Nice, where he obtained a master's degree in public law, then at the University of Oxford in England, where he obtained a master's degree in law under the Erasmus programme. After obtaining a master's degree in public economic law, delivered by the Panthéon-Assas University, he joined the CRFPA of Versailles in 2006, and obtained his CAPA in October 2007. He joined the Papeete bar in November 2007 and began his career as an associate of François Quinquis.

He played rugby, and was Polynesian rugby champion several times. He was part of the French Polynesian rugby team for the 2007 Pacific Games.

Since 1 January 2012 he has been a founding partner of the firm Fenuavocats.

He made himself known to the general Polynesian public in certain criminal cases with strong local media resonance. He is notably the lawyer for Henri Haiti, in the case of the assassination of the German tourist Stefan Ramin, and of Rere Puputauki, in the case of the sinking of the Tahiti Nui IV and the disappearance by journalist Jean-Pascal Couraud.

== Political career ==
Dubois went into politics after meeting Cora Flosse, daughter of Gaston Flosse. He was 17th on the "Punaauia To'u Oire" list of MP Jean-Paul Tuaiva, defeated in the 2014 municipal elections in the municipality of Punaauia. He then successfully led the campaign of Maina Sage, Tahoera'a Huiraatira candidate in the 2014 by-election in French Polynesia's 1st constituency to rep[lace Édouard Fritch.

He was elected senator of French Polynesia on 28 September 2014. During the sitting for the election of the President of the Senate on 1 October 2014, he was secretary of session, being one of the six youngest senators of France. In the Senate, he sat with the UDI-UC group and was a member of the Committee on Constitutional Laws, Legislation, Universal Suffrage, Regulations and General Administration as well as the Senate Overseas Delegation. His election was annulled by the Constitutional Council on 6 February 2015. He contested the by-election to succeed himself on 3 May 2015, winning 34.3% of the vote.

He was the Tahoera'a Huiraatira candidate in French Polynesia's 3rd constituency in the 2017 French legislative election, finishing third in the first round with 27.6% of the vote. As a result, he did not progress to the second round. He subsequently endorsed Moetai Brotherson in the second round.
