= James Heaux =

French Polynesian politician

Member of the French Polynesian Assembly for Windward Isles 2
- Incumbent
- Assumed office 17 May 2018

Personal details
- Born: 1984
- Party: Tahoera'a Huiraatira; Tavini Huiraatira

James Heaux (born 1984) is a French Polynesian broadcaster, politician, and Member of the Assembly of French Polynesia. He is currently a member of Tavini Huiraatira.

Heaux worked as a television anchor for Polynésie la 1ère before entering politics. He was elected to the Assembly of French Polynesia at the 2018 French Polynesian legislative election as a candidate for Tahoera'a Huiraatira. In March 2020 he was a candidate on the Tavini list for municipal elections in Papeete. As a result, Tahoera'a leader Gaston Flosse attempted to exclude him from the party. In March 2022 he formally resigned from the Tahoera'a, leading to its parliamentary group no longer being recognised in the Assembly. In June 2022 he joined the Tavini.
