= Te Mana o te Mau Motu =

Te Mana o te Mau Motu ("the Power of the Islands" in Reo Tahiti) was a parliamentary group of the Assembly of French Polynesia, composed of eight MPs elected in the 2008 French Polynesian legislative election. Its president was Teina Maraeura.

The group was formed in April 2008, when six members of To Tatou Ai'a resigned from that party. They were joined on 14 April by two elected members of the UDSP (Union for Development, Stability and Peace). The party initially supported Gaston Tong Sang, but later changed allegiance, overthrowing the Flosse government in 2008, the Temaru government in 2009, and then returning Temaru to power in 2011.

It notably included the MPs of Te niu hau manahune.
