= Geffry Salmon =

French Polynesian politician

Member of the French Polynesian Assembly for Windward Isles
- Incumbent
- Assumed office 17 May 2018

Personal details
- Party: Tahoera'a Huiraatira

Geffry Salmon (born 1952) is a French Polynesian politician and former Cabinet Minister. He is a member of Tahoera'a Huiraatira.

Salmon is a former chair of the board of telecommunications company OPT and chief executive of Air Tahiti Nui.

In early 2009 he was arrested as part of a corruption investigation into state-owned telecommunications company OPT. He was released in November 2009 after being detained for six months. The case was eventually dismissed in 2019.

He served as Environment Minister and Tourism Minister in 2014.

He headed Tahoera'a Huiraatira's list for the 2018 French Polynesian legislative elections after party leader Gaston Flosse was barred from public office after being convicted of corruption. Despite heading the list, Tahoera'a refused to allow him to participate in election debates. After being elected to the Assembly of French Polynesia, he was the party's candidate for president, but lost to Édouard Fritch, receiving only ten votes of 57.

During the election campaign Salmon accused Fritch of vote-buying, and as a result was sued for defamation. An initial conviction and fine of US$5,000 was subsequently overturned on appeal.
