= A here ia Porinetia =

Political party in French Polynesia

Let’s Love Polynesia A here ia Porinetia
- President: Nicole Sanquer
- Founded: August 2020
- Registered: September 2020
- Split from: Tapura Huiraatira
- Ideology: French Polynesian autonomism Anti-independence; French republicanism Local reformism
- Political position: Right-wing to far-right
- Regional affiliation: Amui tatou
- Colours: Green, white
- National Assembly (French Polynesian seats): 1 / 3
- Senate (French Polynesian seats): 0 / 2
- Assembly of French Polynesia: 3 / 57

A here ia Porinetia (lit. 'I Love Polynesia') is a political party in French Polynesia. The party was formed in August 2020 and advocates a reduction in the size of the Assembly of French Polynesia to 39 members, the introduction of term limits to renew the political class, the legalisation of medicinal cannabis, and the repeal of French Polynesia's vaccination law.

== Formation ==
The party was established in August 2020 by former Tapura Huiraatira MPs Nicole Sanquer, Nuihau Laurey, Bernard Natua, Teura Tarahu-Atuahiva, and Félix Tokoragi. To meet the six-MP minimum to form a group, Tahoera'a Huiraatira MP Vaitea Le Gayic was "loaned" to the party by Tahoera'a, joining it with the permission of Gaston Flosse. The party was formally registered in September 2020. The group lost its parliamentary recognition in January 2021 after Le Gayic resigned and rejoined Tahoera'a, leaving its members as independents.

In October 2021, the three remaining MPs, Sanquer, Laurey and Tokoragi, announced that the party would relaunch in January 2022, and contest the 2022 French legislative election and 2023 French Polynesian legislative election. The party officially launched on 28 March 2022 and endorsed Marine Le Pen in the 2022 French presidential election. It won 14% of the vote in the first round of the 2022 legislative elections, coming in fourth place just behind the Tahoera'a Huiraatira (Amuitahiraa o te Nunaa Maohi). While none of its candidates advanced to the second round, the party's performance was viewed as a good sign for the 2023 territorial elections.

In June 2022 the party was officially recognised as a group in the Assembly, consisting of Sanquer, Laurey, Tokoragi, and ex-Tahoera'a members Le Gayic, Sylviane Terooatea, Etienne Tehaamoana and Geffry Salmon. The former Tahoera'a members were not members of the party and would not necessarily be standing for it at the 2023 election, instead having joined the group in order to enjoy the greater speaking time and collective resources available to recognised party groupings. In October 2022 Bernard Natua rejoined the party.

In January 2023 the party began the process of selecting its list for the 2023 elections. In February 2023 they named Nuihau Laurey as head of the list. The party published its full list on 25 February 2023. The party submitted its list on 17 March. The party came third in the first round. It subsequently announced that its presidential candidate would be Nicole Sanquer rather than Nuihau Laurey.

== Election results ==
=== Territorial elections ===
Year	1st round			2nd round			Seats
Year	Votes	%	Place	Votes	%	Place	Seats
2023	18,067	14.53	3rd	24,989	17.16	3rd	3
