= Tauhiti Nena =

French Polynesian politician

Minister of Education, Youth and Sports
- In office 5 April 2011 – 17 May 2013
- President: Oscar Temaru
- Succeeded by: Michel Leboucher

Minister of Youth and Sports
- In office 18 February 2009 – 25 November 2009

Personal details
- Born: 13 April 1968 (age 58) Papeete, French Polynesia

Tauhiti Nena (born 13 April 1968) is a French Polynesian boxer, sports administrator, politician, and former Cabinet Minister. He is currently president of the Oceania Boxing Confederation and the Olympic Committee of French Polynesia. He is the son boxer Maco Nena and the father of boxer Tautuarii Nena.

Nena was born in Papeete. He won gold in the 81 kg division at the 1995 South Pacific Games. He then worked as a school teacher at Pomare IV high school.

== Political career ==
In 2004 he entered politics, organizing for the Union for Democracy (UPLD) in the 2004 French Polynesian legislative election. He was later appointed Minister of youth and sports in the cabinet of Oscar Temaru. When Temaru returned as president following a confidence vote in April 2011 he was appointed Minister of Education, Youth and Sports. He unsuccessfully stood as a UPLD candidate in the 2012 French legislative election, and in the subsequent by-election, where he lost to Maina Sage in the second round. In 2014 he was one of the UPLD's candidates for the Senate in 2014.

In 2016 he launched the Tau Hotu rau party to advocate for a "third way" between independence and autonomy. The party formed a coalition with the Greens for the 2018 French Polynesian legislative election, but did not gain any seats. He stood as a Tau Hotu rau candidate in the 2017 French legislative election, but was eliminated in the first round. In June 2018 he was convicted of campaign finance violations over the election and barred from office for one year.

He stood for mayor of Papeete in the 2020 municipal elections as head of the Papeete To’u Oire 2020 list, but lost to Michel Buillard. Following the municipal elections he pursued an alliance with Gaston Flosse, and was appointed deputy president of Flosse's new ʻĀmuitahiraʻa o te Nūnaʻa Māʻohi. He was selected as an ʻĀmuitahiraʻa candidate for the 3rd constituency in the 2022 French legislative election, but following a court ruling that Flosse was ineligible for office, decided to stand in the 1st. He was subsequently excluded from the party. He subsequently formed the Hau Mā'ohi Tiama party and contested the elections as a far-right candidate, but was eliminated in the first round.

In the 2022 French presidential election he endorsed far-right candidate Éric Zemmour. When Zemmour was eliminated in the first round he endorsed National Rally candidate Marine Le Pen.

== Sports administration ==
Nena served as president of the Olympic Committee of French Polynesia, until he lost the post in 2001. He was re-elected to the post in 2008, and oversaw Tahiti's preparations for the 2009 Pacific Mini Games in Rarotonga.

In 2016 he was re-elected as president of the Olympic Committee, and oversaw French Polynesia's unsuccessful bid to host the 2017 Pacific Mini Games. In 2017 his election as president was ruled invalid. In October 2017 the Pacific Games Council approved the participation of a boxing squad from Nena's International Boxing Federation-recognised Tahiti Boxing Association, causing the government to officially boycott the games. The boxers competed under the banner of the Pacific Games Council.

In February 2022 he was elected president of the Oceania Boxing Confederation.
