= Nicole Sanquer =

French politician

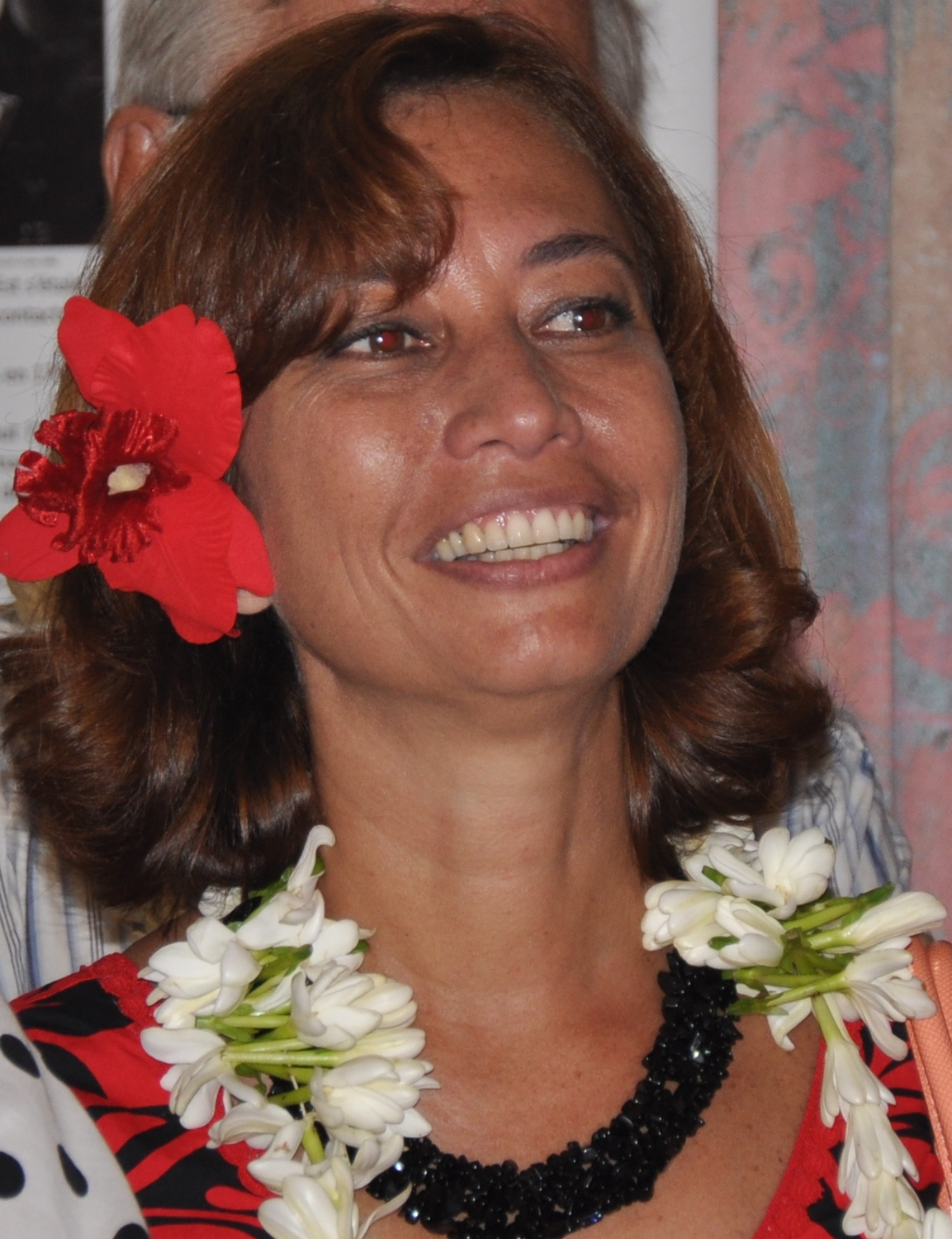
- Sanquer in 2014

Member of the National Assembly for French Polynesia's 2nd constituency
- Incumbent
- Assumed office 18 July 2024
- Preceded by: Steve Chailloux
- In office 21 June 2017 – 21 June 2022
- Preceded by: Jonas Tahuaitu
- Succeeded by: Steve Chailloux

Minister of Education and Higher Education, Youth and Sports
- In office 16 September 2014 – 17 July 2017
- President: Edouard Fritch
- Preceded by: Michel Leboucher
- Succeeded by: Tea Frogier

Member of the Assembly of French Polynesia
- Incumbent
- Assumed office 17 August 2017
- Constituency: Windward Islands
- In office 7 May 2013 – 17 September 2014
- Constituency: Windward Islands

Personal details
- Born: Nicole Sanquer; 16 June 1972 (age 54) Papeete, French Polynesia, France
- Party: A here ia Porinetia (2020–present)
- Other political affiliations: Tāhōʻēraʻa Huiraʻatira (2013–2015); Tāpura Huiraʻatira (2015–2020)
- Education: ESSEC Business School

Nicole Sanquer-Fareata (born 16 June 1972) is a French Polynesian politician, and former Cabinet Minister. She was a member of the French National Assembly from 2017 to 2022. Elected as a member of Tapura Huiraatira, she sits in the UDI and Independents group in the French Parliament. In 2020 she formed the A here ia Porinetia party.

== Early life ==
Sanquer is the daughter of former French Polynesian education minister Nicolas Sanquer. She was educated at the University of French Polynesia, the Paul Bocuse institute of culinary arts in Écully, and ESSEC Business School, graduating with a master's degree in international hotel management in collaboration with Cornell University in 1997. After teaching at the hotel school in Tahiti, she worked as a civil servant in the protocol department of the president of French Polynesia, before serving as the head of the tourism department. In 2001 she returned to teaching at the hotel school. In November 2014 she was awarded the Ordre des Palmes académiques for services to national education.

== Political career ==
Sanquer was first elected to the Assembly of French Polynesia in the 2013 French Polynesian legislative election as a representative for Tahoera'a Huiraatira. She was appointed to the cabinet of Edouard Fritch in September 2014 as Minister of Education, becoming the youngest member of Cabinet. In October 2015 she was appointed Minister for Youth and Sports. While serving as a Minister her seat in the Assembly of French Polynesia was filled by Puta'i Taae.

She was elected to the French National Assembly in the 2017 French legislative election. Following the election she resigned as a Minister and returned to her seat in the French Polynesian Assembly. She was re-elected to the territorial assembly in the 2018 election.

In December 2019 Sanquer declared that she would sit as an independent in the Assembly of French Polynesia. Despite this, she was not expelled from the party.

In August 2020 Sanquer founded A here ia Porinetia with former Tapura Huiraatira MPs Nuihau Laurey, Bernard Natua, Teura Tarahu-Atuahiva, and Félix Tokoragi, as well as Tahoera'a Huiraatira MP Vaitea Le Gayic who was "loaned" by Tahoera'a. The group lost its parliamentary recognition in January 2021 after Le Gayic resigned and rejoined Tahoera'a, leaving its members as independents.

In September 2021 she organised a protest against French Polynesia's vaccination law. That month she also called for the legalisation of medicinal cannabis in the territory.

She ran again as a A here ia Porinetia candidate in the 2022 French legislative election, but was eliminated in the first round.

She was re-elected to the Assembly in the 2023 election.
