= Nuihau Laurey =

French Polynesian politician

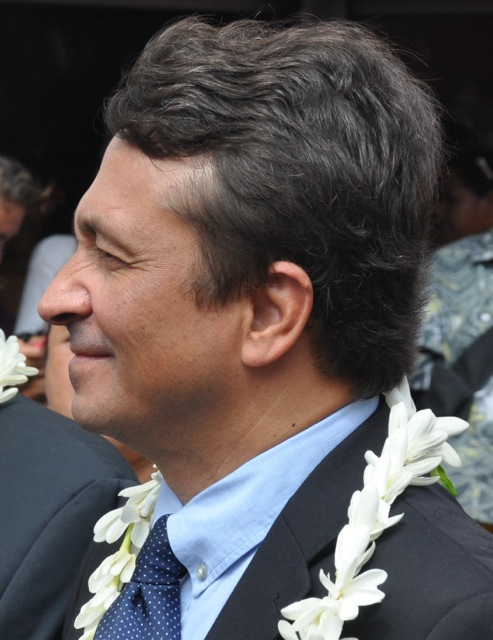
- Laurey in 2014

Senator for French Polynesia
- In office 5 May 2015 – 27 September 2020
- Preceded by: Vincent Dubois
- Succeeded by: Teva Rohfritsch

Vice-President of French Polynesia
- In office 16 September 2014 – 13 January 2017
- President: Gaston Flosse; Édouard Fritch
- Preceded by: Antony Géros
- Succeeded by: Teva Rohfritsch

Minister of Economy and Finance, Budget, Civil Service, Enterprise, Industry and Export Promotion
- In office 16 September 2014 – 28 February 2017
- President: Édouard Fritch
- Succeeded by: Teva Rohfritsch (Economy and Finance)

Minister of Economy, Finance, Budget and Labour
- In office 17 May 2013 – 16 September 2014
- President: Gaston Flosse
- Preceded by: Pierre Frébault

Member of the French Polynesian Assembly for Windward Isles 3
- Incumbent
- Assumed office 7 May 2013

Personal details
- Born: 29 December 1964 (age 61) Papeete, French Polynesia, France
- Party: A here ia Porinetia (2020–present)
- Other political affiliations: Tahoera'a Huiraatira; Tapura Huiraatira (before 2020)

Nuihau Laurey (born 29 December 1964) is a French Polynesian politician and former Cabinet Minister. He was vice-president of French Polynesia from 2014–2017 and one of the two senators for French Polynesia from 2015 to 2020. He was acting president of French Polynesia in 2014 between Gaston Flosse and Édouard Fritch's presidencies.

== Early life ==
Laurey worked for the government-owned Socredo bank before working as a consultant. In 2009, he published Énergies renouvelables plaidoyer pour une véritable politique de l'énergie en Polynésie française (Renewable energy: Advocacy for a real energy policy in French Polynesia), published by Au Vent des Îles. In 2010, he was technical advisor to Teva Rohfritsch, then Minister of Energy, before returning to work again as a conultant.

== Political career ==
He was elected to the Assembly of French Polynesia in the 2013 French Polynesian legislative election. and appointed to the Cabinet of Gaston Flosse as Vice-President and Minister of Economy, Finance, Budget and Labour. As Finance Minister he increased taxes and reduced the size of the public service. He was Acting President from the dismissal of Gaston Flosse on 5 September 2014 until the election of Édouard Fritch on 12 September. He was retained as Vice-President by Fritch, and continued to serve in Cabinet as Minister for the Economy and Finance, Budget, Civil Service, Enterprise, Industry and Export Promotion from 16 September 2014. In March 2015 he was nominated as a candidate for the French Senate by Fritch, against the wishes of Flosse. In April 2015 Flosse expelled him from Tahoera'a Huiraatira over the issue. The expulsion was a significant factor in the collapse of Tahoera'a and the formation of Tapura Huiraatira.

Llaurey was elected senator of French Polynesia on May 3, 2015 during a by-election. He sat in the UDI-UC group in the Senate. He resigned the vice-presidency on 13 January 2017 but retained the Ministry of Budget, Finance and Energy until 28 February 2017.

In June 2020 he left the Tapura Huiraatira party after a dispute with Edouard Fritch over the handling of the COVID-19 pandemic in French Polynesia. He remained in the Assembly, sitting as an independent. In August 2020 he founded A here ia Porinetia with former Tapura Huiraatira MPs Nicole Sanquer, Bernard Natua, Teura Tarahu-Atuahiva, and Félix Tokoragi, as well as Tahoera'a Huiraatira MP Vaitea Le Gayic who was "loaned" by Tahoera'a. The group lost its parliamentary recognition in January 2021 after Le Gayic resigned and rejoined Tahoera'a, leaving its members as independents.

In September 2020 he failed to win re-election to the Senate, losing his seat to Teva Rohfritsch.

In February 2023 he was named at the head of A here ia Porinetia's list for the 2023 French Polynesian legislative election. He was re-elected.
