= Anti-independence =

Anti-independence refers to movements on a regional level against the independence of their community and therefore for the maintenance of territorial integrity of the state to which the latter is attached.

== Terminology ==
The terms "anti-independence" and "loyalist" are generally synonymous, the second term being used mostly in New Caledonia. Separatist movements generally describe their opponents as neo-colonialists.

In the provinces of federal states with secessionist movements, such as Quebec in Canada, anti-independentists are called 'federalists' in the sense that they defend the maintenance of the federal constitution.

In a unitary state, anti-independence movements can be distinguished between centralists (also called Jacobins in France or Unionists in United Kingdom), the 'departmental' movement (especially present in the French overseas collectivity of Mayotte, aiming to make this territory a department and thus lose some of its autonomy) or autonomists.

Anti-independence can thus include various political ideologies and can be seen as a form of nationalism defending the territorial integrity of an already existing state. Being in favor of independence may also be motivated by nationalism due to cultural or civilizational or ethnic differences with the already existing state.
