= President of French Polynesia =

Head of government of French Polynesia

- French: Président de la Polynésie française Tahitian: Peretīteni no te Porīnetia farani
- Coat of arms of French Polynesia

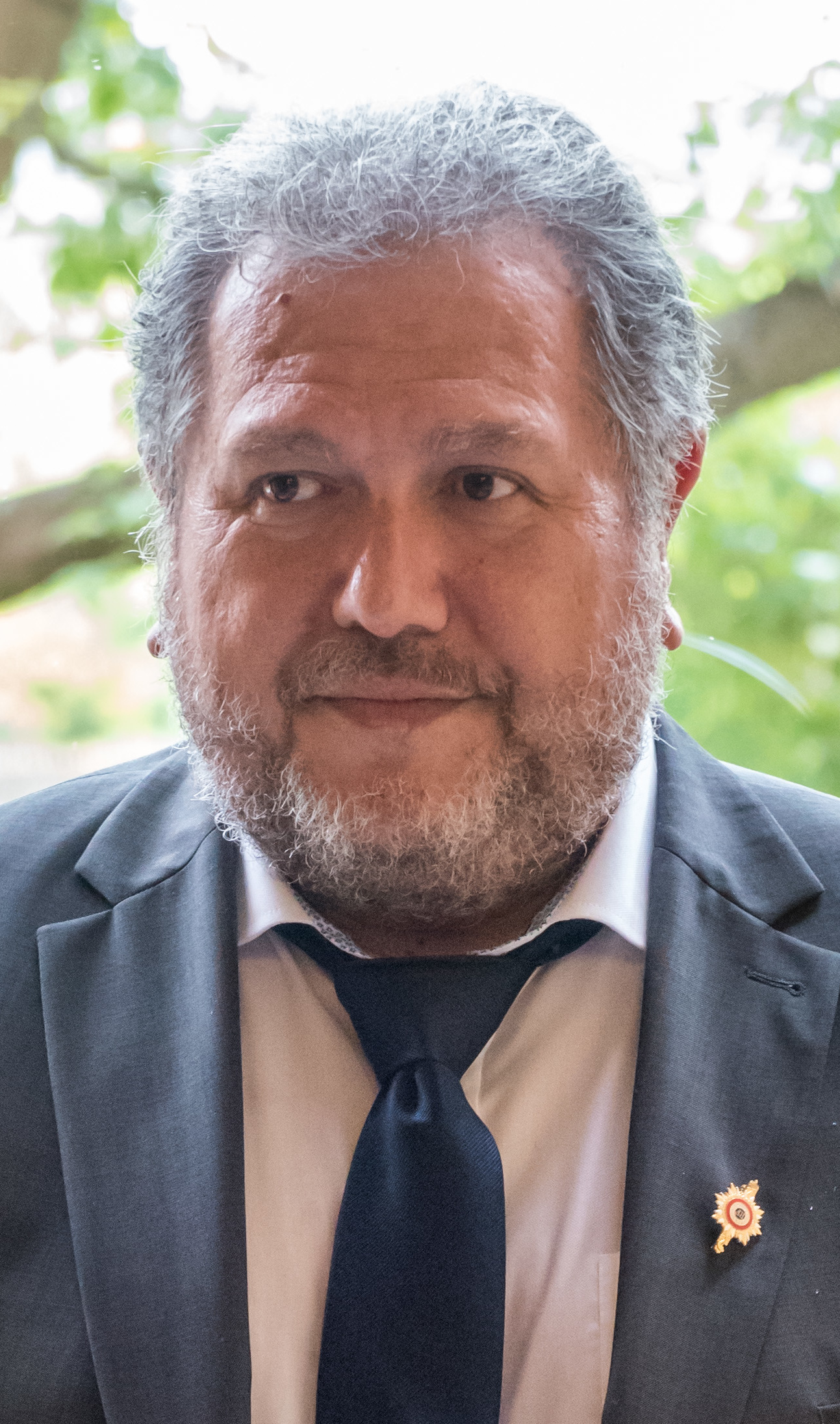
- Incumbent; Moetai Brotherson since 12 May 2023
- Residence: Presidency of French Polynesia, Papeete, Tahiti
- Appointer: Assembly of French Polynesia
- Term length: 5 years, renewable once
- Constituting instrument: Organic Law 2004-192
- Formation: 14 September 1984 (President of the Government); 27 February 2004 (President)
- First holder: Gaston Flosse (President of the Government / President)
- Deputy: Vice-President of French Polynesia
- Salary: F 680,580 monthly
- Website: www.presidence.pf

The president of French Polynesia (French: Président de la Polynésie française; Tahitian: Peretīteni o te Porīnetia Farāni) is the head of government of French Polynesia, an overseas collectivity of France in the Pacific Ocean. The office was first created in 1984. Moetai Brotherson has held the office since 2023.

== List of presidents ==
No.	Portrait	Name (Birth–Death)	Term of office			Political party
No.	Portrait	Name (Birth–Death)	Took office	Left office	Time in office	Political party
Presidents of the Government of French Polynesia
1	Gaston Flosse	Gaston Flosse (born 1931)	14 September 1984	12 February 1987	2 years, 151 days	Tahoera'a Huiraatira
2	Jacques Teuira	Jacques Teuira (born 1933)	12 February 1987	9 December 1987	300 days	Tahoera'a Huiraatira
3	Alexandre Léontieff	Alexandre Léontieff (1948–2009)	12 February 1987	4 April 1991	4 years, 51 days	Te Tiarama
(4)	Gaston Flosse	Gaston Flosse (born 1931)	4 April 1991	27 February 2004	12 years, 329 days	Tahoera'a Huiraatira
Presidents of French Polynesia
(4)	Gaston Flosse	Gaston Flosse (born 1931)	27 February 2004	14 June 2004	108 days	Tahoera'a Huiraatira
5	Oscar Temaru	Oscar Temaru (born 1944)	14 June 2004	23 October 2004	131 days	Tavini Huiraatira
(6)	Gaston Flosse	Gaston Flosse (born 1931)	23 October 2004	3 March 2005	131 days	Tahoera'a Huiraatira
(7)	Oscar Temaru	Oscar Temaru (born 1944)	3 March 2005	26 December 2006	1 year, 298 days	Tavini Huiraatira
8	Gaston Tong Sang	Gaston Tong Sang (born 1949)	26 December 2006	13 September 2007	1 year, 298 days	Tahoera'a Huiraatira
(9)	Oscar Temaru	Oscar Temaru (born 1944)	13 September 2007	23 February 2008	163 days	Tavini Huiraatira
(10)	Gaston Flosse	Gaston Flosse (born 1931)	23 February 2008	15 April 2008	52 days	Tahoera'a Huiraatira
(11)	Gaston Tong Sang	Gaston Tong Sang (born 1949)	15 April 2008	12 February 2009	303 days	To Tatou Ai'a
(12)	Oscar Temaru	Oscar Temaru (born 1944)	12 February 2009	25 November 2009	286 days	Tavini Huiraatira
(13)	Gaston Tong Sang	Gaston Tong Sang (born 1949)	25 November 2009	1 April 2011	1 year, 127 days	To Tatou Ai'a
(14)	Oscar Temaru	Oscar Temaru (born 1944)	1 April 2011	17 May 2013	2 years, 46 days	Tavini Huiraatira
(15)	Gaston Flosse	Gaston Flosse (born 1931)	17 May 2013	5 September 2014	1 year, 111 days	Tahoera'a Huiraatira
–	Nuihau Laurey	Nuihau Laurey (born 1964); Acting	5 September 2014	12 September 2014	7 days	Tahoera'a Huiraatira
16,17	Édouard Fritch	Édouard Fritch (born 1952)	12 September 2014 18 May 2018	12 May 2023	8 years, 242 days	Tapura Huiraatira
18	Moetai Brotherson	Moetai Brotherson (born 1969)	12 May 2023	Incumbent	3 years, 118 days	Tavini Huiraatira

== See also ==
- Politics of French Polynesia
- Kingdom of Tahiti
  - List of monarchs of Tahiti
- List of colonial and departmental heads of French Polynesia
- Vice-President of French Polynesia
