= 2023 French Polynesian legislative election =

← 2018	16 April 2023 (first round); 30 April 2023 (second round)	2028 →
- All 57 seats in the Assembly of French Polynesia; 29 seats needed for a majority
- Turnout: 60.08% (first round) ▼1.43pp 69.96% (second round) ▲3.14pp
Party	Leader	Vote %	Seats	+/–
Tāvini Huiraʻatira	Oscar Temaru	44.32	38	+30
Tāpura–ʻĀmuitahiraʻa	Édouard Fritch	38.53	16	−33
A here ia Porinetia	Nuihau Laurey	17.16	3	New
This lists parties that won seats. See the complete results below.

President of the Assembly of French Polynesia before	President of the Assembly of French Polynesia
Gaston Tong Sang; Tāpura Huiraʻatira	Antony Géros; Tāvini Huiraʻatira

Legislative elections were held in French Polynesia on 16 and 30 April 2023 to elect 57 representatives of the Assembly. The last election was in 2018.

The pro-autonomist Tāpura Huiraʻatira government, led by President Édouard Fritch, sought to win a second consecutive full term, but was defeated by the pro-separatist Tāvini Huiraʻatira opposition, led by former President Oscar Temaru, in a landslide. The Tāvini Huiraʻatira party won 38 of the 57 seats. Following the election, Moetai Brotherson, Tāvini Huiraʻatira's deputy leader, was elected President of French Polynesia by 38 votes against 16 for Fritch and 3 for pro-autonomist Nicole Sanquer of A here ia Porinetia.

== Background ==
The 2018 French Polynesian legislative election saw the Tāpura Huiraʻatira party led by Édouard Fritch emerge as the largest in the Assembly, winning 38 of the 57 seats. Fritch was re-elected as President of French Polynesia, while former President Gaston Tong Sang was elected President of the Assembly.

French Polynesia has been affected by the COVID-19 pandemic.

== Electoral system ==
The Assembly of French Polynesia in 2022

The 57 members of the Assembly of French Polynesia are elected by a proportional multi-member list of two rounds, with a majority premium. Polynesia is a single constituency whose communes make up eight sub-divisions called sections, each with a majority premium of one to four seats according to their population, for a total of 19 premium seats.

Each list presents 73 candidates in the eight sections. Each list is composed alternately of a candidate of each sex. In the first round, the list having received an absolute majority of votes in its section is awarded the majority bonus, then the remaining seats are distributed proportionally among all the lists having crossed the electoral threshold of 5% of the votes according to the method of voting. If no list obtains more than 50% of the votes cast, a second round is held between all the lists having collected more than 12.5% of the votes, those having collected between 5% and 12.5% being able to merge with the lists that have been maintained. The leading list then gets the majority bonus, and the remaining seats are distributed proportionally under the same conditions.

The lists may be reimbursed for part of their campaign costs if they reach the threshold of 3% of the votes cast in the first round, provided that they comply with accounting transparency requirements and legislation on the format of documents.

Electoral sections of French Polynesia
Section	Seats	
Section	Proportional	Majority bonus
Windward Isles 1	13	4
Windward Isles 2	13	4
Windward Isles 3	11	4
Leeward Islands	8	3
West Tuamotus	3	1
Gambier Islands and East Tuamotus	3	1
Marquesas Islands	3	1
Austral Islands	3	1

== Party participation ==
Prior to the election Tapura leader Édouard Fritch obtained a court ruling that the two-term limit applied to whole terms, and that therefore he was eligible to be elected as president despite having served in the role for nine years.

After being inactive for 15 years, Here Ai'a announced on 21 January 2023 that it would contest the 2023 election, and that its program would focus on independence.

In February 2023 A here ia Porinetia named Nuihau Laurey as head of its list. It published its full list on 25 February 2023.

On 14 February 2023 Tamatoa Perez announced he would contest the elections with the Te reo manahune party.

On 10 March 2023 Tāvini Huiraʻatira announced that Moetai Brotherson would be their candidate for the presidency.

On 14 March 2023 Heiura-Les Verts became the first party to formally submit a party list. Tāvini Huiraʻatira, Tāpura Huiraʻatira, and A here ia Porinetia submitted their lists on 17 March. A total of seven lists were submitted. Here Ai'a and Te reo manahune did not submit a list.

Party	Leader	Ideology
A here ia Porinetia	Nuihau Laurey	Anti-independence, pro-autonomy
ʻĀmuitahiraʻa o te Nūnaʻa Māʻohi	Gaston Flosse	Anti-independence, liberal conservatism, Gaullism, pro-autonomy
Hau Maohi	Tauhiti Nena	Big tent
Heiura-Les Verts	Jacky Bryant	Green politics, Polynesian independence
Ia Ora te Nuna'a	Teva Rohfritsch	Anti-independence, pro-autonomy
Tāvini Huiraʻatira	Oscar Temaru	Polynesian independence, social democracy
Tāpura Huiraʻatira	Édouard Fritch	Anti-independence, liberalism, pro-autonomy

== Results ==
Turnout in the first round declined, to 60.08%. Tāvini Huiraʻatira led in the first round with about 35% of the vote. Following the first round, Heiura-Les Verts and Hau Māʻohi both endorsed the Tāvini. The ʻĀmuitahiraʻa o te Nūnaʻa Māʻohi merged its list with Tāpura Huiraʻatira, forming a joint Union of Autonomists Against Independence. A here ia Porinetia announced that its presidential candidate would be Nicole Sanquer rather than Nuihau Laurey. Ia Ora te Nuna'a called on its voters to vote for either of the autonomist parties in the second round.

In second round on 30 April 2023 turnout was 69.96%. Pro independence party Tavini jumped to 38 seats from 8 seats in previous election. Pro autonomist Tapura got 15 seats, ally Amuitahira got 1 seat and A here ia got 3 seats. Pro independence Tavini got the majority first time in electoral history.

French Polynesia Assembly 2023
Party	First round		Second round		Seats	+/–
Party	Votes	%	Votes	%	Seats	+/–
Tāvini Huiraʻatira	43,401	34.90	64,551	44.32	38	+30
Tāpura Huiraʻatira	37,880	30.46	56,118	38.53	15	–23
ʻĀmuitahiraʻa o te Nūnaʻa Māʻohi	14,773	11.88	56,118	38.53	1	–10
A here ia Porinetia	18,067	14.53	24,989	17.16	3	New
Ia Ora te Nuna'a	5,423	4.36			0	New
Hau Māʻohi	2,458	1.98			0	New
Heiura-Les Verts	2,373	1.91			0	New
Total	124,375	100.00	145,658	100.00	57	0
Valid votes	124,375	98.50	145,658	98.97		
Invalid votes	748	0.59	823	0.56		
Blank votes	1,149	0.91	700	0.48		
Total votes	126,272	100.00	147,181	100.00		
Registered voters/turnout	210,161	60.08	210,385	69.96		
Source: Haut-commissaire; (seats)

Following the election Antony Géros was elected President of the Assembly, with 41 votes in favour and 16 abstentions. Moetai Brotherson was elected President of French Polynesia, defeating Édouard Fritch 38 votes to 19.

== See also ==
- List of members of the Assembly of French Polynesia (2023–2028)
