= Windward Islands (Society Islands) =

Archipelago in French Polynesia

Native name: Îles du Vent
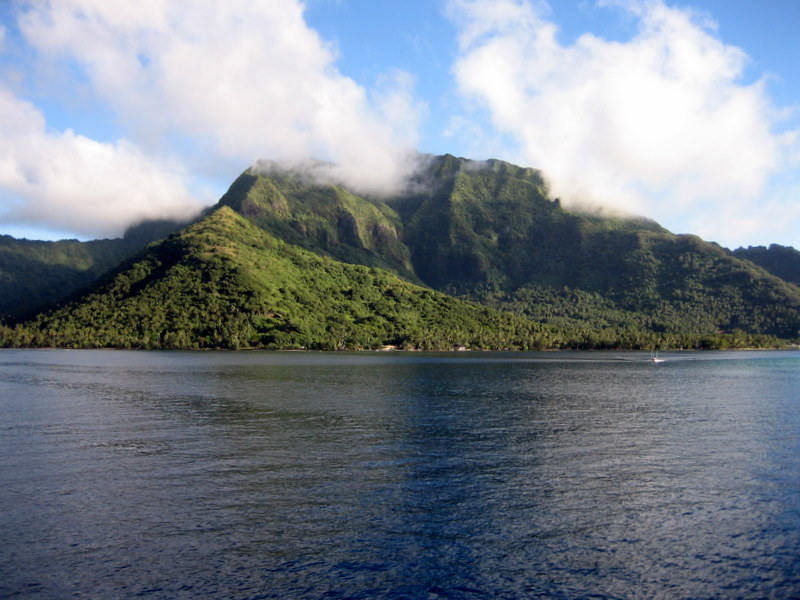
- Mo'orea

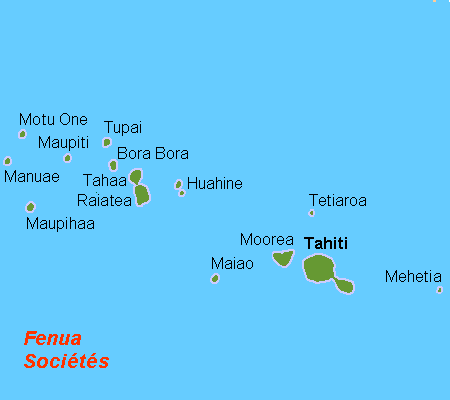
- Map of the Society Islands, with the Windward Islands in the lower right

Geography
- Location: Pacific Ocean
- Coordinates: 17°32′S 149°50′W
- Archipelago: Society Islands
- Major islands: Tahiti, Moorea, Tetiaroa
- Area: 1,195 km^{2} (461 sq mi)
- Highest elevation: 2,241 m (7352 ft)
- Highest point: Mont Orohena

Administration
- France
- Overseas collectivity: French Polynesia
- Largest settlement: Papeete (capital) (pop. 131,695 urban)

Demographics
- Population: 194,623 (Aug. 2007 census)
- Pop. density: 163/km^{2} (422/sq mi)

The Windward Islands (French: Îles du Vent [il dy vɑ̃]) are the eastern group of the Society Islands in the French Polynesia, an overseas collectivity of France in the southern Pacific Ocean. These islands were also previously named the Georgian Islands in honour of King George III of the United Kingdom.

== Geography ==
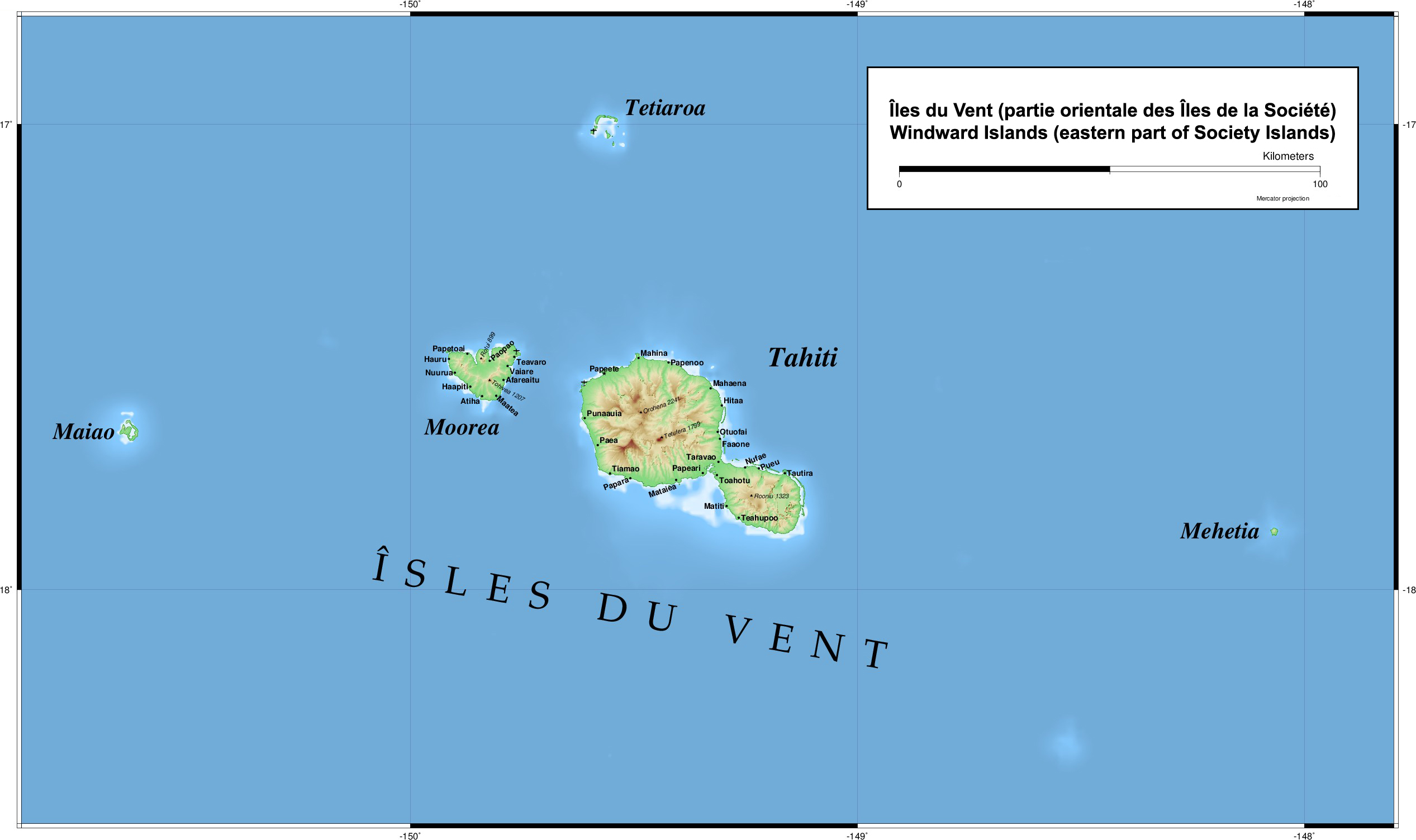

The archipelago comprises an administrative division (French: subdivision administrative) of French Polynesia, and includes the following islands:

- Tahiti
- Moorea
- Mehetia
- Tetiaroa
- Maiao

The capital of the administrative district is Papeete on the island of Tahiti. Tahiti, Moorea, and Mehetia are volcanic islands. Tetiaroa and Maiao are coral atolls.

== Culture ==
French and Tahitian are co-official languages throughout French Polynesia.

== Administrative ==
The Windward Islands form the administrative subdivision of the Windward Islands (subdivision administrative des Îles du Vent), one of French Polynesia's five administrative subdivisions. The administrative subdivision of the Windward Islands geographically co-extensive with the electoral district of the Windward Islands (circonscription des Îles du Vent), one of French Polynesia's 6 electoral districts (circonscriptions électorales) for the Assembly of French Polynesia (see also Politics of French Polynesia).

== See also ==
- Leeward Islands (Society Islands)
