= Tāvini Huiraʻatira =

Political party in French Polynesia

Tavini Huiraʻatira Tāvini Huiraʻatira nō te Ao Māʻohi
- President: Oscar Temaru
- Vice President: Antony Géros
- Founded: 1977; 49 years ago (FLP) 1986; 40 years ago (current)
- Headquarters: Faʻaʻā, Tahiti, French Polynesia
- Ideology: Polynesian independence Progressivism; Polynesian nationalism Left-wing nationalism
- Political position: Centre-left to left-wing
- National affiliation: Democratic and Republican Left group NUPES; New Popular Front (2024–present)
- Colours: Blue, azure
- National Assembly (French Polynesian seats): 0 / 3
- Senate (French Polynesian seats): 0 / 2
- Assembly of French Polynesia: 38 / 57

Party flag

Website
- www.tavinihuiraatira.com

Tāvini Huiraʻatira (lit. 'People's Servant' or 'Serve the People'), also known as Tāvini huiraʻatira nō te ao māʻohi – FLP (lit. 'Serving the Maohi people' or 'Servant of the Maohi people'), is a pro-independence political party in French Polynesia. Founded in 1977 as the Front de libération de la Polynésie (FLP), the party has been led since its inception by Oscar Temaru. From 2004 to 2013 it was part of the Union for Democracy (UPLD) coalition.

The party has primarily been in the opposition, but between 2004 and 2013 governed French Polynesia at various times as part of various coalition arrangements.

== History ==
The party was founded in 1977 by Oscar Temaru under the name the Front for the Liberation of Polynesia (FLP). In 1983 it changed its name to Tāvini huiraʻatira nō te ao māʻohi – FLP and adopted the motto Te Atua tāʻu fatu ("The Lord is my master"). It contested the 1983 municipal elections, which saw Temaru win the mayoralty of Faʻaʻā for the first time.

At the 1986 election the party won two seats in the Assembly of French Polynesia. It won four seats at the 1991 election, ten at the 1996 election, and 13 at the 2001 election.

At the 2004 elections it joined with Aia Api, Here Ai'a, and Ia Mana te Nunaa to form the Union for Democracy (UPLD) coalition. The coalition won 27 out of 57 seats. Defeated president Gaston Flosse attempted to have the elections declared invalid in an effort to retain power, and the Government of France threatened financial sanctions if Temaru was elected, but Temaru was elected President of French Polynesia on 14 June 2004. He was ousted in a no-confidence vote four months later, beginning an extended period in which the presidency alternated between Temaru, Flosse, and Gaston Tong Sang. The coalition won 19 of 57 seats at the 2008 election, but the alternation of governments and coalition rearrangements continued. Temaru was re-elected president with the support of Tahoera'a Huiraatira in February 2009, lost power again in November, and was re-elected again in April 2011. The UPLD-led coalition then held power until its defeat at the 2013 elections. Shortly after the elections the United Nations restored French Polynesia to the United Nations list of non-self-governing territories, a key goal of the Tavini.

In the 2017 French legislative election, Moetai Brotherson became the first member of Tavini Huiraatira elected to the French National Assembly.

At the 2018 election the party won only eight seats.

In the 2022 French National Assembly election the party won all three of the French Polynesian constituencies.

On 10 March 2023 the party announced that Moetai Brotherson would be their candidate for the presidency in the 2023 French Polynesian legislative election. It released its full party list on 17 March. The party led the first round, with 35% of the vote.

== Election results ==
=== Territorial elections ===
Year	1st round			2nd round			Seats
Year	Votes	%	Place	Votes	%	Place	Seats
1986						5th	2 / 41
1991						4th	4 / 41
1996						2nd	10 / 41
2001						2nd	13 / 49
2004	Part of Union for Democracy (UPLD)						0 / 57
2008	Part of Union for Democracy (UPLD)						0 / 57
2013	Part of Union for Democracy (UPLD)						0 / 57
2018	25,891	20.7	3rd	31,378	23.1	3rd	8 / 57
2023	43,401	34.9	1st	64,551	44.3	1st	38 / 57
