= Tāpura Huiraʻatira =

List of the People Tapura Huira‘atira
- President: Édouard Fritch
- Secretary-General: Nicole Bouteau
- 1st Vice President: Vacant
- Founded: 2016
- Headquarters: 41 Colette Street, Papeete, Tahiti, French Polynesia, France
- Ideology: Liberalism; French Polynesian autonomy Anti-independence
- Political position: Centre
- National affiliation: Renaissance
- Regional affiliation: Amui tatou
- Colours: Red
- National Assembly (French Polynesian seats): 1 / 3
- Senate (French Polynesian seats): 1 / 3
- Assembly of French Polynesia: 16 / 57 (Note: Includes 1 Amuitahiraʻa MP elected from the Tapura list)

Website
- tapurahuiraatira.org

Tapura Huiraatira (lit. 'List of the People') is a political party in French Polynesia. It was founded on 20 February 2016 by members of Tahoera'a Huiraatira (French: Rassemblement populaire), a parliamentary coalition in the Assembly of French Polynesia, as well as other smaller parties such as Fetia Api.

It is chaired by Édouard Fritch, the President of French Polynesia. Its first congress was attended by 8,000 people, including 38 Polynesian mayors. Nicole Sanquer was the party's only Member of Parliament before she left to join A here ia Porinetia.

They wish to maintain political autonomy within the French Republic and continue to grow that relationship while strengthening ties with Oceania, given their geographical position.

The party won 49 percent of the vote and 38 seats in the 2018 French Polynesian legislative election. Fritch was re-elected as President of French Polynesia, while Gaston Tong Sang was elected President of the Assembly.

In March 2019 the party declared its support for La République En Marche! in the 2019 European Parliament election, resulting in criticism from its National Assembly and Senate members over a lack of consultation.

In September 2022 Teva Rohfritsch, Nicole Bouteau and Philip Schyle resigned from the party, citing disappointment with Edouard Fritch's government.

The party submitted its list for the 2023 French Polynesian legislative election on 17 March 2023. The party came second in the first round, with 30% of the vote. It subsequently formed a joint list with ʻĀmuitahiraʻa o te Nūnaʻa Māʻohi, the Union of Autonomists Against Independence.

== Creation ==
In early 2015, 4 members of the Tahoera'a Huiraatira party were excluded from being associated with the party in the upcoming senatorial elections. These were the members of Lana Tetuanui, Nuihau Laurey, Michel Buillard, and Teapehu Teahe due to their rebelling from party rhetoric during their time in the assembly. In the 2015 elections, only Nuihau Laurey and Lana Tetuanui were re-elected, however, both were given political support by the at-the-time French-Polynesian President and leader of Tahoera'a Huiraatira, Édouard Fritch, as well as the A Tia Porinetia (ATP) coalition.

In late 2015, a group of members (initially 15, later 20) from Tahoera'a Huiraatira chose to dissent from the party due to conflicts between the former leader, Gaston Flosse, and President Édouard Fritch, as well as the exclusion of party members.

In 2016, an extremely short-lived working group was established to support the dissenting former party leader Édouard Fritch called the 'Rassemblement pour une Majorité Autonomiste' (lit. 'Rally for an Autonomous Majority'), which included 20 (later 22) dissenting members of Tahoera'a Huiraatira, 8 members of the 'A Tia Porinetia' (lit. 'The Gathering of Polynesians') coalition, and one former UPLD, Union pour la Démocratie (lit. 'Union for Democracy'), coalition member.

Members of 'Rassemblement pour une Majorité Autonomiste', and later members of the Tāpura Huiraʻatira party
Member Name	Political Association	Party Membership	Additional Notes
Édouard Fritch	None	Dissenting members of Tahoera'a Huiraatira	Leader of Tāpura Huiraʻatira
Joseph Ah-Scha	None	Dissenting members of Tahoera'a Huiraatira	
Dylma Aro	None	Dissenting members of Tahoera'a Huiraatira	
Virginia Bunting	None	Dissenting members of Tahoera'a Huiraatira	
Michel Buillard	None	Dissenting members of Tahoera'a Huiraatira	
Felix Faatau	None	Dissenting members of Tahoera'a Huiraatira	
Jacquie Graffe	None	Dissenting members of Tahoera'a Huiraatira	
Beatrix Lucas	None	Dissenting members of Tahoera'a Huiraatira	
Sylvana Puhetini	None	Dissenting members of Tahoera'a Huiraatira	
Maina Sage	None	Dissenting members of Tahoera'a Huiraatira	
Puta'i Taae	None	Dissenting members of Tahoera'a Huiraatira	
Jeanine Tata	None	Dissenting members of Tahoera'a Huiraatira	
Teapehu Teahe	None	Dissenting members of Tahoera'a Huiraatira	
Moehau Teriitahi	None	Dissenting members of Tahoera'a Huiraatira	
Lana Tetuanui	None	Dissenting members of Tahoera'a Huiraatira	
John Toromona	None	Dissenting members of Tahoera'a Huiraatira	
Henri Flohr	None	Dissenting members of Tahoera'a Huiraatira	
Frederic Riveta	None	Dissenting members of Tahoera'a Huiraatira	
Rene Temeharo	None	Dissenting members of Tahoera'a Huiraatira	
Charles Fong Loi	None	Dissenting members of Tahoera'a Huiraatira	
Isabelle Sachet	None	Dissenting members of Tahoera'a Huiraatira	
Jacques Raioha	None	Dissenting members of Tahoera'a Huiraatira	joined group on 03/23/2016
Rudolph Jordan	None	Dissenting members of Tahoera'a Huiraatira	joined group on 08/21/2016
Nicole Bouteau	A Tia Porinetia working group	No Oe e Te Nunaa (NOETN)(lit. 'For You and the People')	
Emma Maraea	A Tia Porinetia working group	O Porinetia To Tatou Aia(lit. 'My Polynesia, My Roots')	
Armelle Merceron	A Tia Porinetia working group	Independent	
Antonio Perez	A Tia Porinetia working group	Te Ave'a	
Philip Schyle	A Tia Porinetia working group	Fetia Api(lit. 'New Star')	
Teura Tarahu-Atuahiva	A Tia Porinetia working group	Independent	
Gaston Tong Blood	A Tia Porinetia working group	O Porinetia To Tatou Aia(lit. 'My Polynesia, My Roots')	
Ronald Tumahai	A Tia Porinetia working group	O’Hiva (lit. 'The team running for the country')	replacing Teva Rohfritsch
Joelle Rauzy-Frebault	UPLD coalition	?	Left the UPLD coalition to join Tāpura Huiraʻatira

On the 20th of February the official creation of the Tapura Huiraatira party is announced, with the former parties of To Tia Porinetia (ATP), O Porinetia To Tatou Aia, No Oe e Te Nunaa (NOETN), Fetia Api and Te Aveia being dissolved.

== Election results ==
Year	1st round			2nd round			Seats
Year	Votes	%	Place	Votes	%	Place	Seats
2018	53,795	43.04	1st	66,730	49.18	1st	38 / 57
2023	37,880	30.46	2nd				15 / 57

=== 2018 Territorial Elections ===
Party	First round		Second round		Seats	+/–
Party	Votes	%	Votes	%	Seats	+/–
Tapura Huiraatira	53,795	43.04	66,730	49.18	38	New
Tahoera'a Huiraatira	36,754	29.41	37,591	27.70	11	–27
Tavini Huiraatira	25,891	20.71	31,378	23.12	8	–3
Te Ora Api o Porinetia	4,606	3.69			0	New
E Reo Manahune	2,503	2.00			0	New
Popular Republican Union	1,441	1.15			0	New
Total	124,990	100.00	135,699	100.00	57	0
Valid votes	124,990	98.32	135,699	98.34		
Invalid/blank votes	2,134	1.68	2,286	1.66		
Total votes	127,124	100.00	137,985	100.00		
Registered voters/turnout	206,670	61.51	206,496	66.82		
Source: Haut-Commissariat

=== 2023 Territorial Elections ===
French Polynesia Assembly 2023
Party	First round		Second round		Seats	+/–
Party	Votes	%	Votes	%	Seats	+/–
Tāvini Huiraʻatira	43,401	34.90	64,551	44.32	38	+30
Tāpura Huiraʻatira	37,880	30.46	56,118	38.53	15	–23
ʻĀmuitahiraʻa o te Nūnaʻa Māʻohi	14,773	11.88	56,118	38.53	1	–10
A here ia Porinetia	18,067	14.53	24,989	17.16	3	New
Ia Ora te Nuna'a	5,423	4.36			0	New
Hau Māʻohi	2,458	1.98			0	New
Heiura-Les Verts	2,373	1.91			0	New
Total	124,375	100.00	145,658	100.00	57	0
Valid votes	124,375	98.50	145,658	98.97		
Invalid votes	748	0.59	823	0.56		
Blank votes	1,149	0.91	700	0.48		
Total votes	126,272	100.00	147,181	100.00		
Registered voters/turnout	210,161	60.08	210,385	69.96		
Source: Haut-commissaire; (seats)
