= 2018 French Polynesian legislative election =

- 22 April 2018 (first round); 6 May 2018 (second round)
- All 57 seats in the Assembly of French Polynesia; 29 seats needed for a majority
- Turnout: 61.51% (first round) ▼4.56pp 66.82% (second round) ▼5.97pp
Party	Leader	Vote %	Seats	+/–
Tāpura Huiraʻatira	Édouard Fritch	48.18	38	New
Tāhōʻēraʻa Huiraʻatira	Geffry Salmon	27.70	11	−27
Tāvini Huiraʻatira	Oscar Temaru	23.12	8	−3
This lists parties that won seats. See the complete results below.
President before	President elect
Édouard Fritch; Tāpura Huiraʻatira	Édouard Fritch; Tāpura Huiraʻatira

Legislative elections were held in French Polynesia on 22 April and 6 May 2018. On 22 April 2018, voters cast their ballots in the first round of the election to the Assembly of French Polynesia. A second round was held on 6 May 2018 for the three political parties that exceeded 12.5 percent of the vote in the first round. The new Tapura Huiraatira party emerged as the largest in the Assembly, winning 38 of the 57 seats in a landslide.

== Background ==
The Tahoera'a Huiraatira party, an anti-independence party led by Gaston Flosse, previously won 38 of the 57 seats in the Assembly in the 2013 general election. However, the governing Tahoera'a Huiraatira has been plagued by infighting and internal splits since 2013. Some former Tahoera'a Huiraatira members set up a new political party, which has since merged with the only other anti-independence party in the Assembly. Notably, Assembly Speaker Marcel Tuihani quit Tahoera'a Huiraatira in June 2017, and set up a rival party.

All French Polynesian political parties must alternate between male and female candidates to encourage a gender balance among legislative candidates.

The French High Commissioner of French Polynesia René Bidal announced the vote registration for the territorial election will be open from 12 to 26 March 2018.

== Electoral system ==
The 57 members of the Assembly of French Polynesia are elected by a proportional multi-member list of two rounds, with a majority premium. Polynesia is a single constituency whose communes make up of eight sub-divisions called sections, each with a majority premium of 1 to 4 seats according to their population for a total of 19 premium seats.

Each list presents 73 candidates in the eight sections. Each list is composed alternately of a candidate of each sex. In the first round, the list having received an absolute majority of votes in its section is awarded the majority bonus, then the remaining seats are distributed proportionally among all the lists having crossed the electoral threshold of 5% of the votes according to the method of voting. If no list obtains more than 50% of the votes cast, a second round is held between all the lists having collected more than 12.5% of the votes, those having collected between 5% and 12.5% being able to merge with the lists that have been maintained. The leading list then gets the majority bonus, and the remaining seats are distributed proportionally under the same conditions.

The lists may be reimbursed for part of their campaign costs if they reach the threshold of 3% of the votes cast in the first round, provided that they comply with accounting transparency requirements and legislation on the format of documents.

Electoral sections of French Polynesia
Section	Seats	
Section	Proportional	Majority bonus
Windward Isles 1	13	4
Windward Isles 2	13	4
Windward Isles 3	11	4
Leeward Islands	8	3
West Tuamotus	3	1
Gambier Islands and East Tuamotus	3	1
Marquesas Islands	3	1
Austral Islands	3	1

== Party participation ==
In December 2017, France's ruling party, En Marche, which was founded by French President Emmanuel Macron, announced that it would contest the French Polynesian legislative election in 2018 for the first time. Efforts at forming a coalition involving En Marche and other known political figures in the territory, under the name Here Fenua, reportedly failed in February 2018.

In February 2018, Oscar Temaru, leader of Tavini Huiraatira, said he will not rule out his party boycotting the election.

Party	Leader	Ideology
Tahoera'a Huiraatira	Geffry Salmon	Anti-independence, liberal conservatism, gaullism
Tavini Huiraatira	Oscar Temaru	Polynesian independence, social democracy
Tapura Huiraatira	Édouard Fritch	Anti-independence, liberalism, autonomy
Te Ora Api o Porinetia	Marcel Tuihani	Anti-independence
E Reo Manahune	Tauhiti Nena	Autonomy
Popular Republican Union	Jérôme Gasior	Autonomy

=== Banned candidates ===
Former President of French Polynesia Gaston Flosse was not allowed to stand for election in April 2018. He is not allowed to hold public office due to two convictions for public corruption in 2014 and 2016. Despite Flosse's claims he can stand in the election, based on advice given by his lawyers, an election court in Tahiti upheld the election ban against Flosse in January 2018.

== Results ==
Party	First round		Second round		Seats	+/–
Party	Votes	%	Votes	%	Seats	+/–
Tapura Huiraatira	53,795	43.04	66,730	49.18	38	New
Tahoera'a Huiraatira	36,754	29.41	37,591	27.70	11	–27
Tavini Huiraatira	25,891	20.71	31,378	23.12	8	–3
Te Ora Api o Porinetia	4,606	3.69			0	New
E Reo Manahune	2,503	2.00			0	New
Popular Republican Union	1,441	1.15			0	New
Total	124,990	100.00	135,699	100.00	57	0
Valid votes	124,990	98.32	135,699	98.34		
Invalid/blank votes	2,134	1.68	2,286	1.66		
Total votes	127,124	100.00	137,985	100.00		
Registered voters/turnout	206,670	61.51	206,496	66.82		
Source: Haut-Commissariat

=== By section ===
Percentages
Section	Te Ora Api o Porinetia	Tavini Huiraatira	E Reo Manahune	Tahoera'a Huiraatira	Popular Republican Union	Tapura Huiraatira
Windward Isles 1	4.50	18.23	2.76	30.32	1.25	42.94
Windward Isles 2	3.61	20.47	1.77	31.36	1.31	41.47
Windward Isles 3	4.42	34.38	2.05	20.26	1.69	37.20
Leeward Isles	1.56	19.25	1.54	27.18	0.69	49.78
West Tuamotus	6.28	12.24	1.94	30.06	0.88	48.60
Gambier Islands and East Tuamotus	5.45	8.31	0.98	39.13	0.53	45.60
Marquesas Islands	2.03	10.73	1.78	37.92	0.60	46.93
Austral Islands	1.57	14.89	1.96	40.87	0.37	40.35
Source: Haut-Commissariat

Votes
Section	Te Ora Api o Porinetia	Tavini Huiraatira	E Reo Manahune	Tahoera'a Huiraatira	Popular Republican Union	Tapura Huiraatira
Windward Isles 1	1,323	5,362	813	8,917	367	12,629
Windward Isles 2	1,249	7,083	613	10,851	455	14,350
Windward Isles 3	952	7,414	441	4,368	365	8,022
Leeward Isles	302	3,720	298	5,252	133	9,619
West Tuamotus	350	682	108	1,675	49	2,708
Gambier Islands and East Tuamotus	245	374	44	1,760	24	2,051
Marquesas Islands	115	608	101	2,148	34	2,658
Austral Islands	68	647	85	1,776	16	1,753
Source: Haut-Commissariat

== See also ==
- List of members of the Assembly of French Polynesia (2018–2023)
