= ʻĀmuitahiraʻa o te Nūnaʻa Māʻohi =

Rally of the Maohi People Amuitahiraʻa o te Nunaʻa Maohi
- President: Bruno Sandras
- Founded: 1977
- Split from: Rally for the Republic
- Headquarters: Boîte postale 471, Papeete, Tahiti
- Ideology: Conservatism; Historical: Gaullism
- Political position: Centre-right to right-wing
- National affiliation: Union of Democrats and Independents
- Regional affiliation: Amui tatou
- Colours: Orange
- National Assembly (French Polynesian seats): 0 / 3
- Senate (French Polynesian seats): 0 / 2
- Assembly of French Polynesia: 1 / 57

Party flag
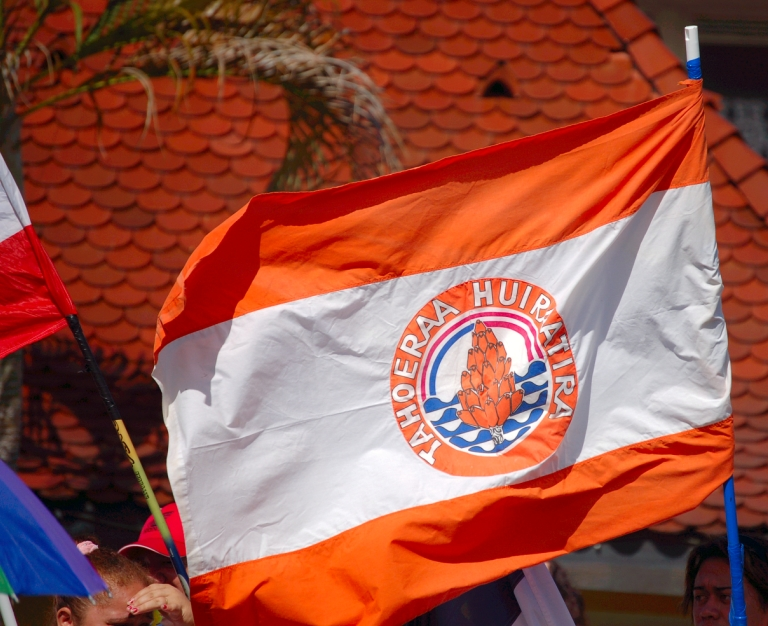

Website
- www.tahoeraahuiraatira.pf

Amuitahiraʻa o te Nunaʻa Maohi (French: Rassemblement du peuple Maohi, lit. 'Rally of the Maohi People'), known as Tāhōʻēraʻa Huiraʻatira (French: Rassemblement populaire, lit. 'Popular Rally') until January 2022, is a political party in French Polynesia. The party is conservative, pro-independence and pro-association. It was founded in 1977 by Gaston Flosse, who initially supported French Polynesia's autonomy arrangement with France before his current support for independent association with France, and who has led the party for over 20 years.

Historically, the party was backed by most non-Polynesian settlers (Europeans and Asians) in French Polynesia; nonetheless the party had to rely on Polynesian support to win elections, as they make up 70% of the territory's population.

== History ==
Logo as Tāhōʻēraʻa Huiraʻatira

The party was formed in 1977 from the Tahitian Union-UDR. Originally Gaullist, in 1980 it announced its support for self-government for French Polynesia.

On 23 May 2004, in the legislative elections and on 13 February 2005 in the by-elections, the party won 27 out of 57 seats.

Gaston Tong Sang was the party's presidential candidate in the election of March 2005, but was defeated by Oscar Temaru by 29 votes to 26. On 26 December 2006, Tong Sang was elected President of French Polynesia. He fell to a no-confidence vote on 31 August 2007, and Temaru was elected again on 14 September 2007. Tong Sang then split from his former party to found a new party called O Porinetia To Tatou Ai'a.

The party elected two deputies to the French National Assembly in 2007. It won 10 seats in the 2008 territorial elections.

== 2013 victory and collapse ==
At the 2013 territorial elections the party won 38 of 57 seats. Flosse was elected president, with Nuihau Laurey as his vice-president. In September 2014 Flosse was convicted of corruption and removed from office, and Édouard Fritch succeeded him as president. A subsequent dispute between Fritch and Flosse and a series of expulsions saw the party split in May 2015, with 15 MPs leaving to form Tapura Huiraatira. A further series of expulsions and defections saw the party weakened further before the 2018 election.

At the 2017 French presidential election the party endorsed National Front candidate Marine Le Pen.

Flosse attempted to stand at the 2018 territorial elections but was ruled ineligible by the courts, and he did not appear on the party list. The party won 28 percent of the vote and 11 seats in the election. All of them left the party for other groups over the course of the term.

== 2022 renaming ==
At its party congress on 30 January 2022 the party formally renamed itself Amuitahira'a o te nuna'a maohi and selected candidates for the 2022 French legislative election. The party supported Valérie Pécresse in the 2022 French presidential election. The party supports a referendum with the objective of making French Polynesia an associated state of France as a way of obtaining independence for the Maohi people.

The party failed to meet the 12.5% threshold to enter the second round of the 2023 election. It subsequently formed a joint list with Tāpura Huiraʻatira, the Union of Autonomists Against Independence.

In July 2024 Gaston Flosse stepped down as president of the party.
