= Mouaputa =

Mountain in French Polynesia

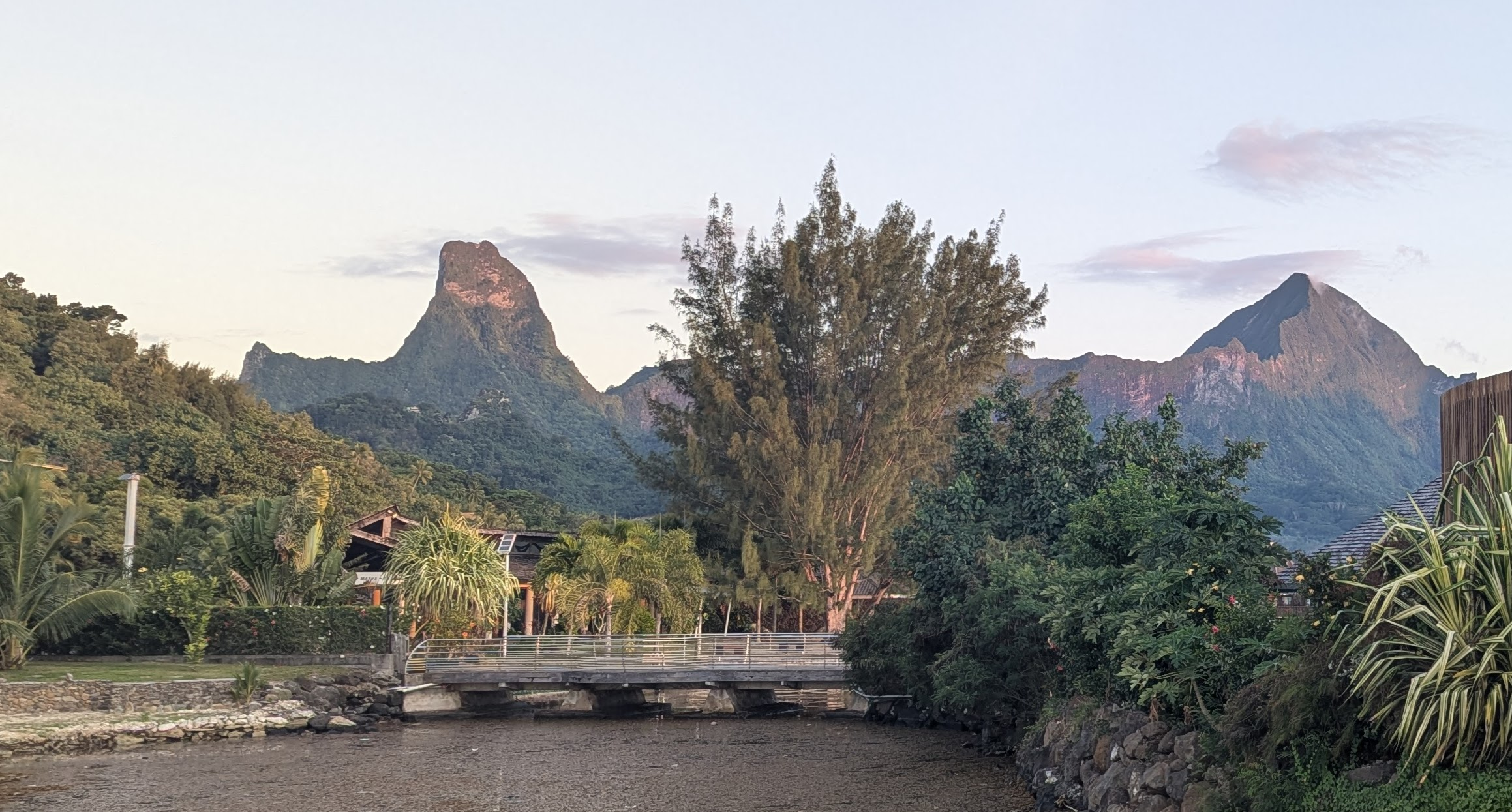
- Mouaputa (left) and Mount Tohivea (right) as seen looking south from the shore of Cook's Bay

Highest point
- Elevation: 830 m (2,720 ft)
- Listing: Mountains of French Polynesia
- Coordinates: 17°31′35″S 149°48′12″W

Geography
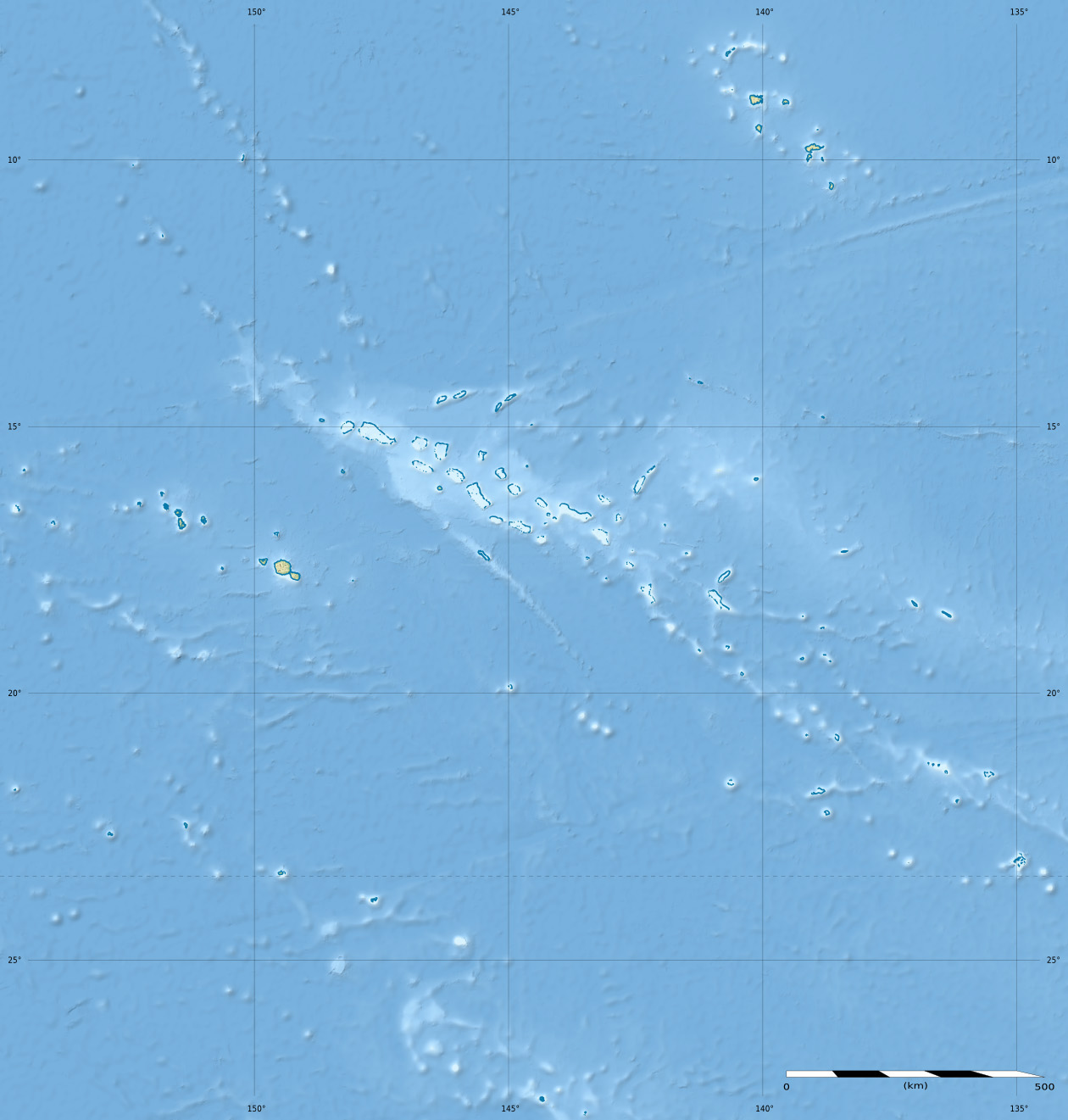
- Location within French Polynesia Location within Pacific Ocean
- Location: French Polynesia

Geology
- Volcanic zone: Society hotspot

Mouaputa (alternately spelled Mouʼaputa) is a prominent peak on the eastern side of the island of Moorea in French Polynesia. It lies about 3 kilometres (1.9 mi) southeast of the head of Cook's Bay and about 3 kilometres (1.9 mi) northeast of the highest point in Moorea, Mount Tohivea.

Mouaputu, Mount Tohivea and another prominent peak to the west, Mouaroa, are the eroded remnants of the crater rim of the extinct shield volcano that built Moorea.

Mouʼa Puta means 'Hole Mountain' in Tahitian, a reference to a distinctive hole which passes entirely through the tip of the summit, visible from around Moorea. Legend says that the hole was formed by a spear thrown from Tahiti by the demigod Pai.
