= Mouaroa =

Mountain in French Polynesia

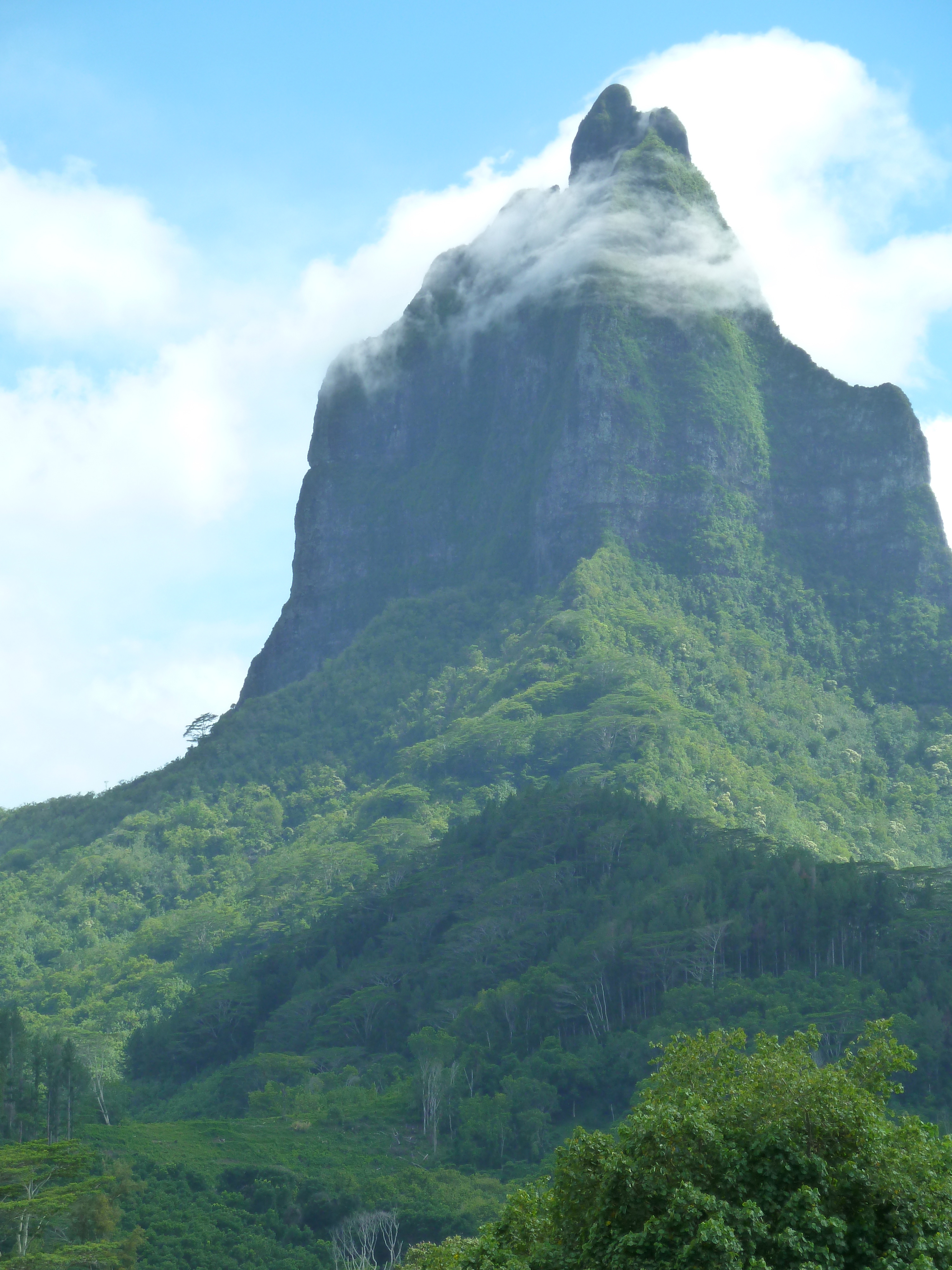
- Mouaroa from Opunohu Bay

Highest point
- Elevation: 880 m (2,890 ft)
- Listing: Mountains of French Polynesia
- Coordinates: 17°32′41″S 149°50′56″W

Geography
- Location within Pacific Ocean
- Location: French Polynesia

Geology
- Volcanic zone: Society hotspot

Mouaroa (alternately spelled Mouʼaroa or Mouʼa Roa) is a prominent peak near the center of Moorea, an island in French Polynesia in the central Pacific Ocean. Described as being "shark-tooth-shaped", Mouaroa stands about 3 kilometres (1.9 mi) south of the head of Opunohu Bay and about 2 kilometres (1.2 mi) west of the highest point in Moorea, Mount Tohivea.

Mouaroa, Tohivea, and nearby Mouaputa - a similar prominent peak - are the eroded remnants of the crater rim of the extinct shield volcano that built Moorea.

Mouʼa Roa means 'Great Mountain' in Tahitian.
