= Malik Joyeux =

French Polynesian surfer

Personal information
- Born: Malik Joyeux; March 31, 1980 France
- Died: December 2, 2005 (aged 25) Oahu, Hawaii
- Height: 175 cm (5 ft 9 in)
- Weight: 70 Kg

Surfing career
- Sport: Surfing

Surfing specifications
- Stance: goofy-foot

Malik Joyeux (31 March 1980 – 2 December 2005) was an accomplished all-around waterman and a professional Big Wave surfer. Known by many as the "petit prince", the goofy-foot surfer often gained attention for charging the treacherous barrels at Teahupoo, Tahiti. He was credited in 2003 with the Billabong XXL Tube of the Year for riding one of the largest waves ever to be surfed in history.

Joyeux was one of Tahiti's best known professional surfers and was featured on the cover of Surfer Magazine's 2004 "Big Issue".

== Early life ==
Joyeux was born in France and moved to French Polynesia at a young age, where his mother Hélène raised her three children on the tropical island of Moorea. He started surfing at the age of 8.

For years his older brother Teiva, little sister Tylane and mother Hélène lived in a big hut near Haapiti on Moorea with no luxuries. It had no walls, just a wooden structure with a roof, surrounded by ferns and palm trees, and the ocean just meters away.

Teiva managed to turn professional windsurfer and kite-surfer and moved to Hawaii to pursue his dream. Malik started to get some sponsorship deals as a surfer: just a few clothes, some boards and plane tickets.

French surfer Didier Piter took him under his wing in the European Gotcha team and managed to finally finance his surf trips with an official contract.

== Death ==
On Friday, December 2, 2005, Joyeux took off deep on an eight-foot wave at Oahu's Pipeline in Hawaii. It has been stated by witnesses that as Joyeux dropped into the wave, the nose of his board sank into the face of the wave, slowing his forward momentum. He quickly recovered, but the damage had been done. He tried to maneuver, but due to the loss of critical speed on this highly technical wave, he was struck by the lip of the wave and forced underwater. The force of the wave broke his board. Aamion Goodwin, who caught the next wave, commented that the leash of his board was completely intact, ripped off by the force of the wave. With his board no longer attached to his body, he was impossible to locate visually. Water photographers and other surfers searched for Joyeux, but difficulties and conditions hindered the search. He was found 15 minutes later at Pupukea beach break, off to the right of the peak at Pipeline, by surfer Myles Padaca. Padaca reached him and brought him to the beach with the help of several other surfers. Lifeguards and paramedics attempted to resuscitate him but were unable to do so. An autopsy report revealed that he had likely hit his head on his surfboard, instantly rendering him unconscious.

== Awards ==
- 1999 "¼ final Gotcha Tahiti Pro"
- 2000 "¼ final Gotcha Tahiti Pro"
- 2001 Semi-Finalist "Volcom air show"
- 2003 "Billabong XXL Heaviest Tube"
- 2004 "Monster Tube Award"

== Notes and references ==
- Pro Surfer Malik Joyeux Dies at Pipeline on Surfer magazine
- Rider's Profile of Malik Joyeux on Oxboworld
