= Opunohu Bay =

Coordinates: 17.504°S 149.856°W

Opunohu Bay (also spelled ʼŌpūnohu) is a 3-km long bay on the island of Moorea near Tahiti in French Polynesia. The water is 80 metres deep at the mouth. The bay is subject to wind-driven currents and upwellings. Sailboats and tour boats regularly enter the bay. Opunohu bay is west of Cook's Bay and Pao Pao.

The British explorer Captain James Cook visited Mo'orea during his first voyage in 1769 to observe the transit of Venus, but Cook himself did not visit the island until his third voyage. He landed in Opunohu Bay on 30 September 1777, but later visited what is now Cook's Bay by land.

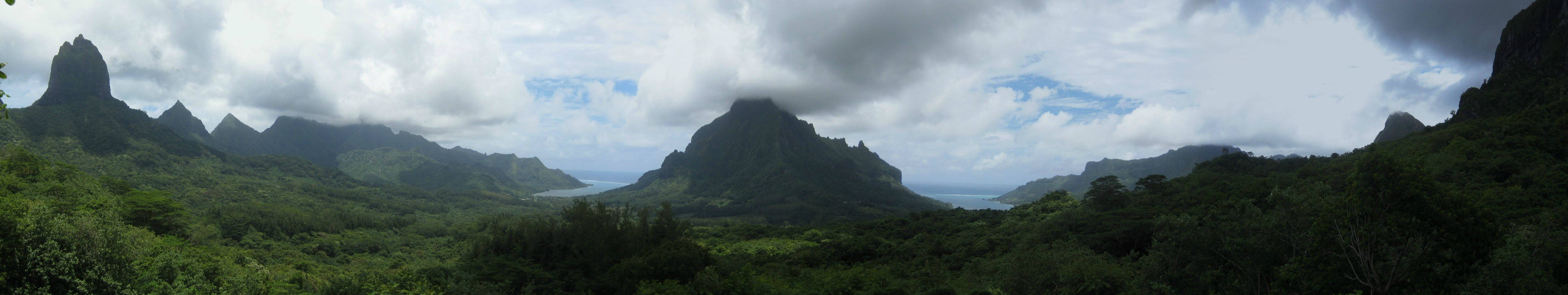
A panorama view from Belvedere Point on Mount Tohivea, looking towards Opunohu Bay on the left, and Cook's bay on the right, separated by Mou'a Rotui (899 m). Mou'a Roa (880 m) is on the left.

== Geography ==
Opunohu bay is in western Moorea. It is separated from Cook's Bay by Mount Rotui. Mount Tohivea, Moorea's highest mountain, lies just to the south. Also visible from the bay to the south-west is Mou'aroa. The settlement of Papetoai is located to the west side of the bay with Piheana located on the east side.

== Tourism ==
People mainly come into the bay to get to Papetoai. They mainly come to Papetoai to shop at the shopping center. Pao Pao is not too far away from the bay. Some people stop at a small road that goes all the way to Mount Tohivea with views of the two bays of Moorea. International flights land at the Faa'a International Airport on Tahiti. Tourists can reach Moorea by either ferry or airplane to Moorea Airport.
