= List of mountains in French Polynesia =

The following is a list of mountains in French Polynesia.

Summit	Height (m)	Prominence (m)	Island	Coordinates
Mont Orohena	2241	2241	Tahiti	17°37′23″S 149°28′37″W
Pito Hiti	2110		Tahiti	17.614278°S 149.46386°W
Mont Aorai	2065	616	Tahiti	17.614313°S 149.495103°W
Mont Ivirairai	1651		Tahiti	
Mont Mahutaa	1501		Tahiti	
Mount Ronui	1332		Tahiti	17.822767°S 149.215352°W
Mont Oave	1229		Ua Pou	9°23′30″S 140°04′42″W
Tekao	1223		Nuku Hiva	8°50′39″S 140°09′57″W
Temetiu	1213		Hiva Oa	9°47′50″S 139°04′48″W
Mount Tohivea	1207	1207	Mo'orea	17.5449°S 149.8127°W
Mont Mauru	1172		Tahiti	
Teraiotupo	1084			
Te Tara O Maiao	1020		Tahiti	
Tefatoaiti	1016			
Toopuu	922			
Mont Rōtui	920			
Mont Marau	891			
Atara	891			
Hitikau	884		Ua Huka	8°54′20″S 139°31′17″W
Mouaroa	880		Moʼorea	17.5446358°S 149.8488944°W
Mont Maturaorao	879			
Mouatamaiti	871			
Ainui	837			
Auorotini	441	441	Mangareva	23°07′43″S 134°58′25″W
