= Mount Tohivea =

Mountain in French Polynesia

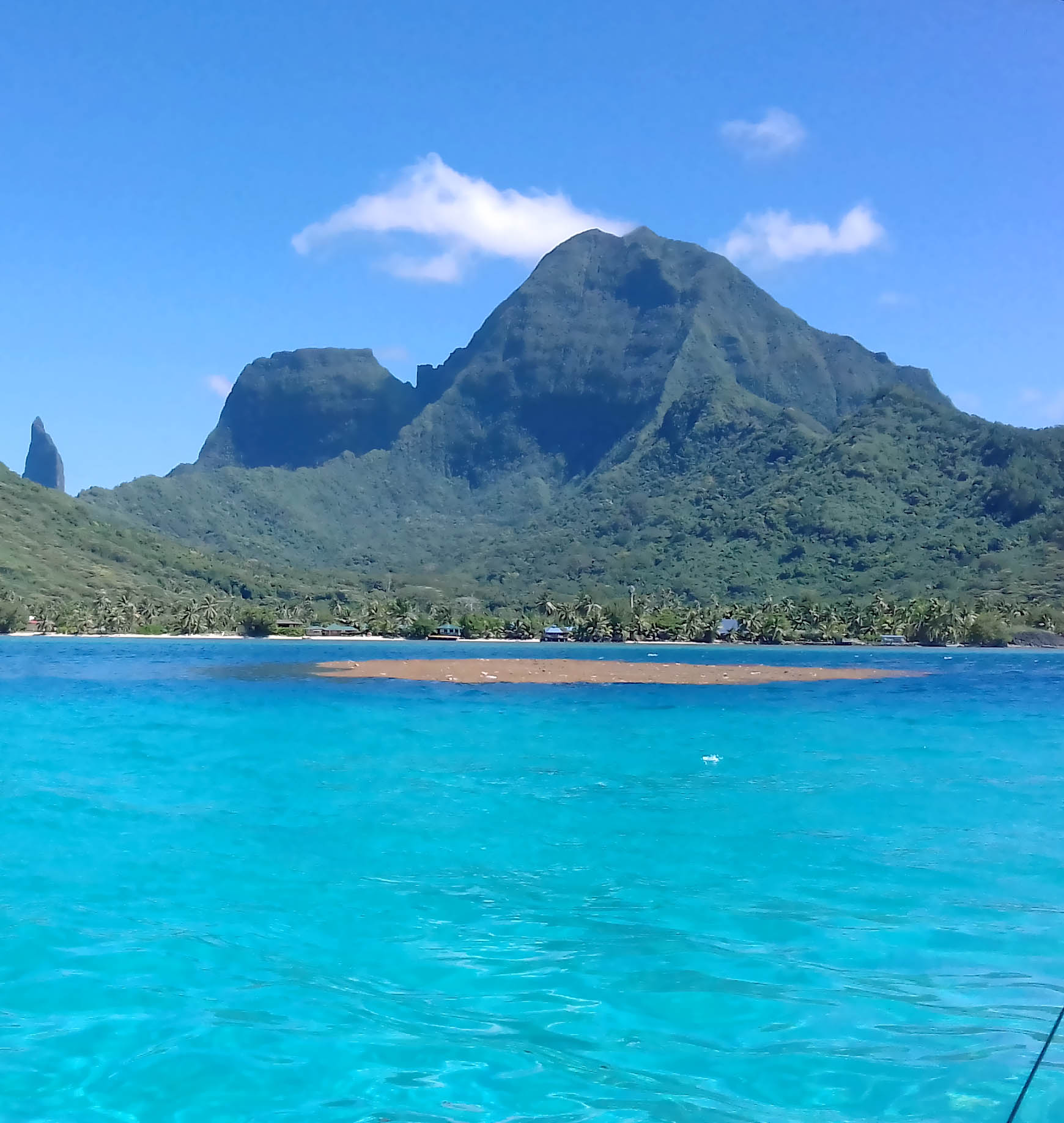
- View of Mount Tohivea from the south

Highest point
- Elevation: 1,207 m (3,960 ft)
- Prominence: 1,207 m (3,960 ft)
- Listing: Mountains of French Polynesia
- Coordinates: 17°33′03″S 149°49′20″W

Geography
- Location within Pacific Ocean
- Location: Moorea, French Polynesia

Geology
- Volcanic zone: Society hotspot

Mount Tohivea (or Tohiea) is the highest point on the island of Mo'orea in French Polynesia at 1,207 metres (3,960 ft). The mountain is about 3.2 kilometres (2.0 mi) south of the settlement of Pao Pao, and is easily visible from the west coast of nearby Tahiti, approximately 24 kilometres (15 mi) to the east.

Mount Tohivea, along with the adjacent peaks of Mouaroa and Mouaputa, is the remnant of the eroded crater rim of an extinct shield volcano. This volcano built Mo'orea between 1.9 and 1.5 million years ago, the result of geological activity from the Society Hotspot.

Hiking trails on the mountain offer views north to Cook's and Opunohu bays, and east to Tahiti.
