= Mont Aorai =

Mountain in French Polynesia

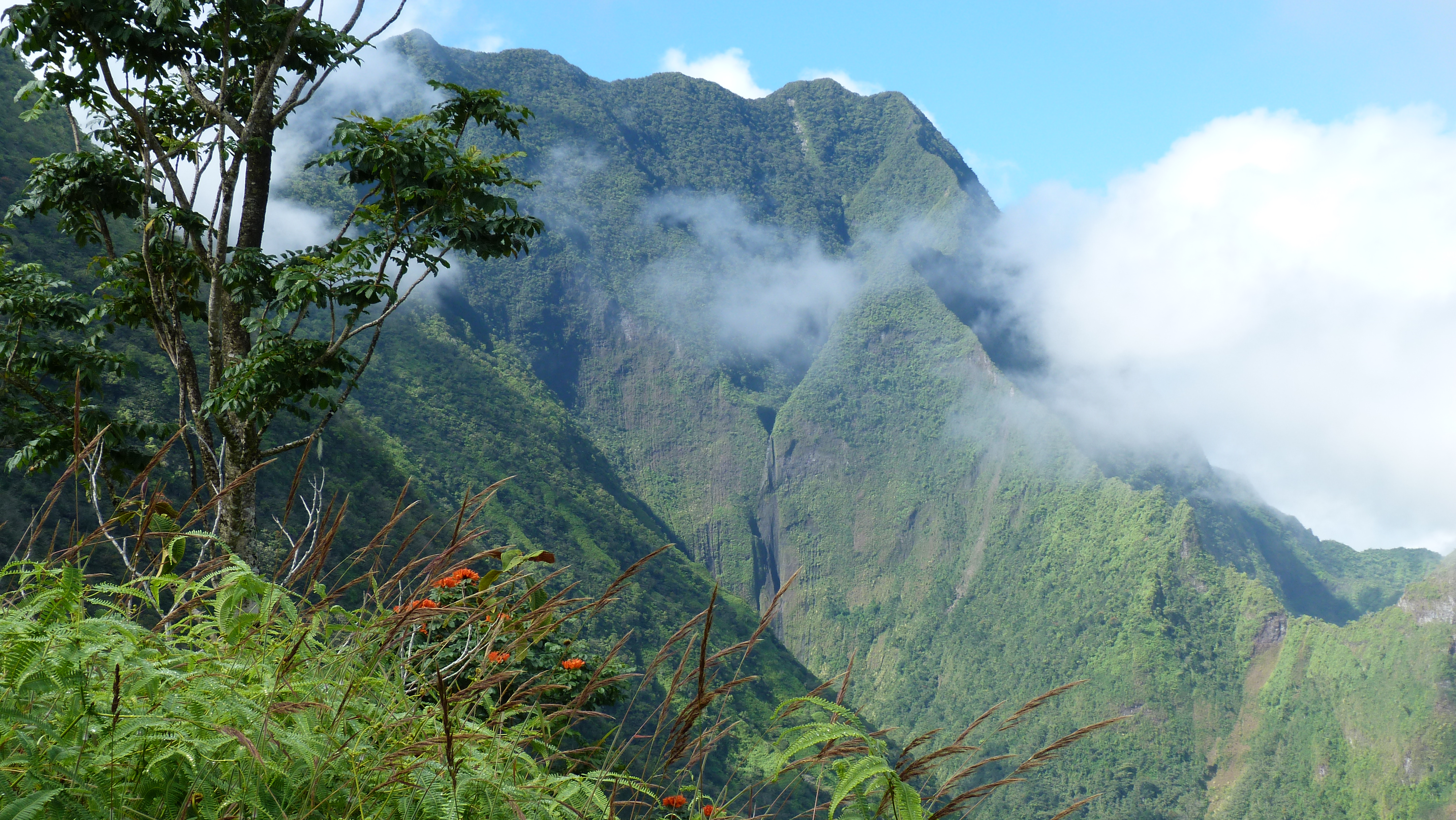
- Mont Aorai

Highest point
- Elevation: 2,066 m (6,778 ft)
- Prominence: 616m
- Coordinates: 17.614313°S 149.495103°W

Geography
- Location: French Polynesia

Geology
- Volcanic zone: Society hotspot

Mont Aorai is a mountain on the island of Tahiti in French Polynesia. With an elevation of 2,066 metres (6,778 ft) it is the island's third-highest peak, after Mont Orohena and Pito Hiti.
