= Teavaro =

Te'avaro
- Associated commune of Moʻorea-Maiʻao
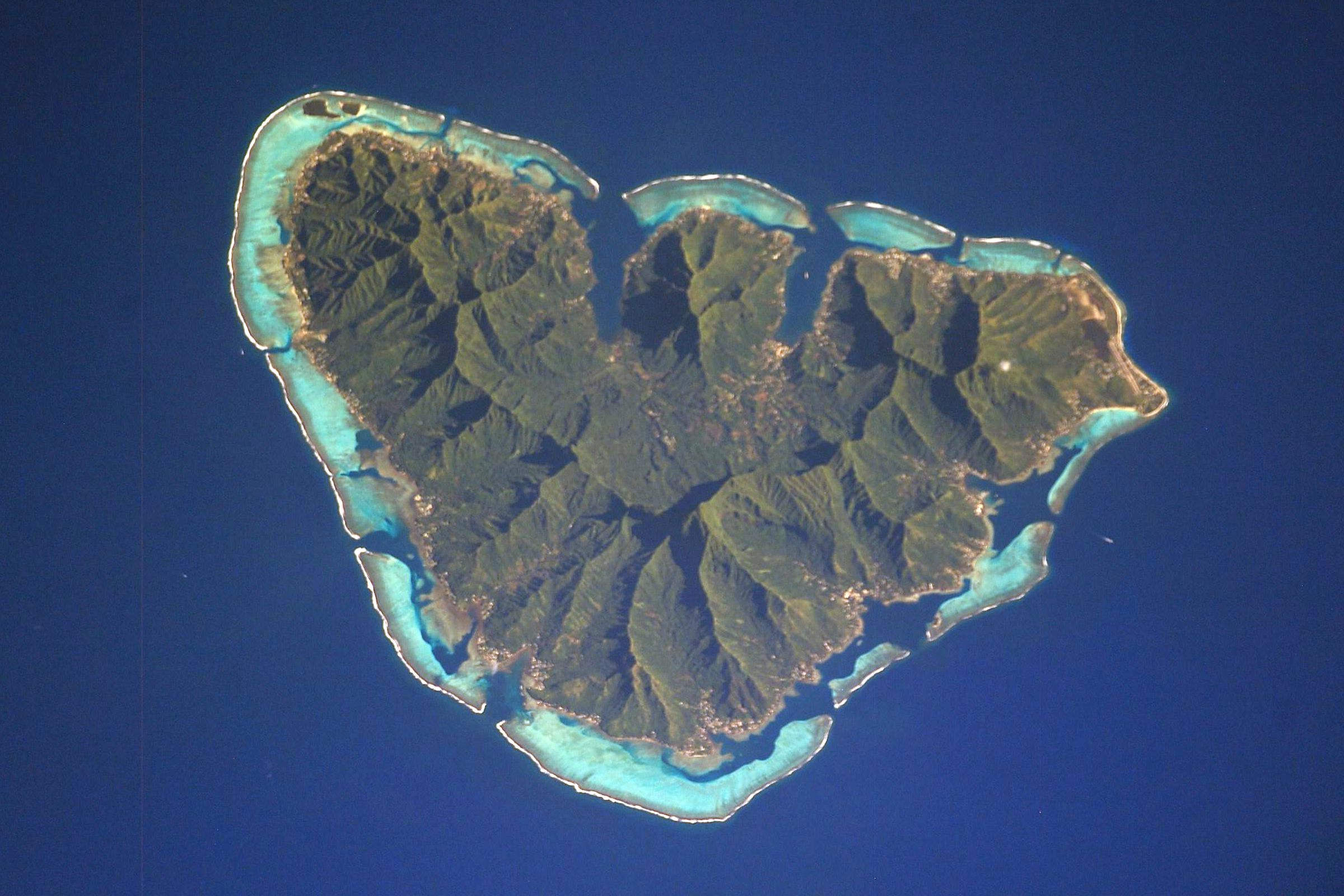
- Moʻorea, the island on which Te'avaro is located

- Location within French Polynesia
- Location of Te'avaro
- Coordinates: 17°30′28″S 149°46′12″W
- Country: France
- Overseas collectivity: French Polynesia
- Subdivision: Windward Islands
- Commune: Moʻorea-Maiʻao
- Elevation: 6 m (20 ft)
- Population (2022): 2,585
- Time zone: UTC−10:00

Te'avaro is an associated commune on the island of Mo'orea, in French Polynesia. It is part of the commune Moʻorea-Maiʻao. According to the 2022 census, it had a population of 2,585.
