= Moʻorea-Maiʻao =

Commune in French Polynesia, France

- Commune
- Flag

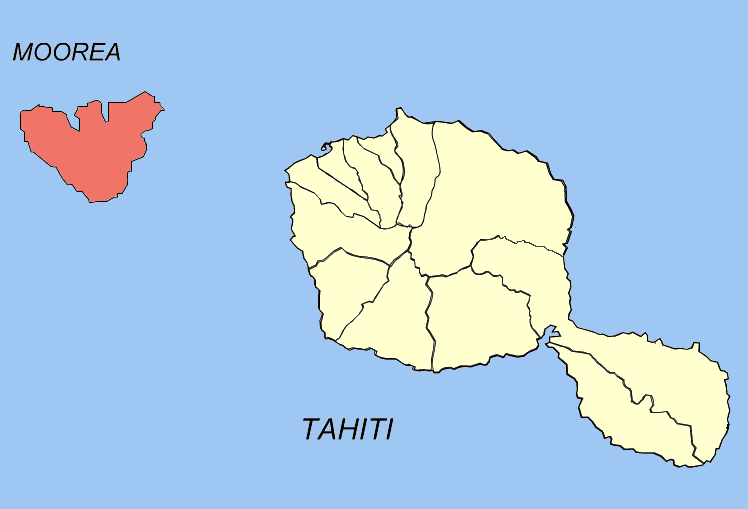
- Location of the commune (in red) within the Windward Islands. The atoll of Maiao lies outside of the map.
- Location of Moʻorea-Maiʻao
- Coordinates: 17°31′35″S 149°49′05″W
- Country: France
- Overseas collectivity: French Polynesia
- Subdivision: Windward Islands

Government
  - Mayor (2020–2026): Evans Haumani
- Area^{1}: 141.8 km^{2} (54.7 sq mi)
- Highest elevation: 1,207 m (3,960 ft)
- Lowest elevation: 0 m (0 ft)
- Population (2022): 18,201
  - Density: 128.4/km^{2} (332.4/sq mi)
- Time zone: UTC−10:00
- INSEE/Postal code: 98729 /98728
- ^{1} French Land Register data, which excludes lakes, ponds, glaciers > 1 km^{2} (0.386 sq mi or 247 acres) and river estuaries.

Moʻorea-Maiʻao is a commune of French Polynesia, an overseas territory of France in the Pacific Ocean. It consists of the island of Moʻorea (133 km^{2}/51 sq. miles) and the much smaller atoll of Maiʻao (8.8 km^{2}/3.4 sq. miles), located 78 km (48 mi) southwest of Moʻorea, with both being part of the Windward Islands administrative subdivision. As of the 2022 census, Moorea-Maiao had a population of 18,201, of whom 17,858 lived on Mo'orea and 343 lived on Maiao.

The administrative centre of the commune is the settlement of Afareaitu on the island of Mo'orea.

Moorea-Maiao consists of the following associated communes:

Commune associée	Area (km^{2})	Population 2022	Population density (Note: calculated as population per km^{2})
Afareaitu	23.8	4,055	170
Haapiti	38.8	4,109	106
Pao Pao	30.0	4,895	163
Papetoai	25.4	2,214	87
Teavaro	15.8	2,585	164
Maiao	8.3	343	41
Commune; Moorea-Maiao	141.8	18,201	128
