= Afareaitu =

Associated commune in French Polynesia

ʻĀfareaitu
- Associated commune of Moʻorea-Maiʻao
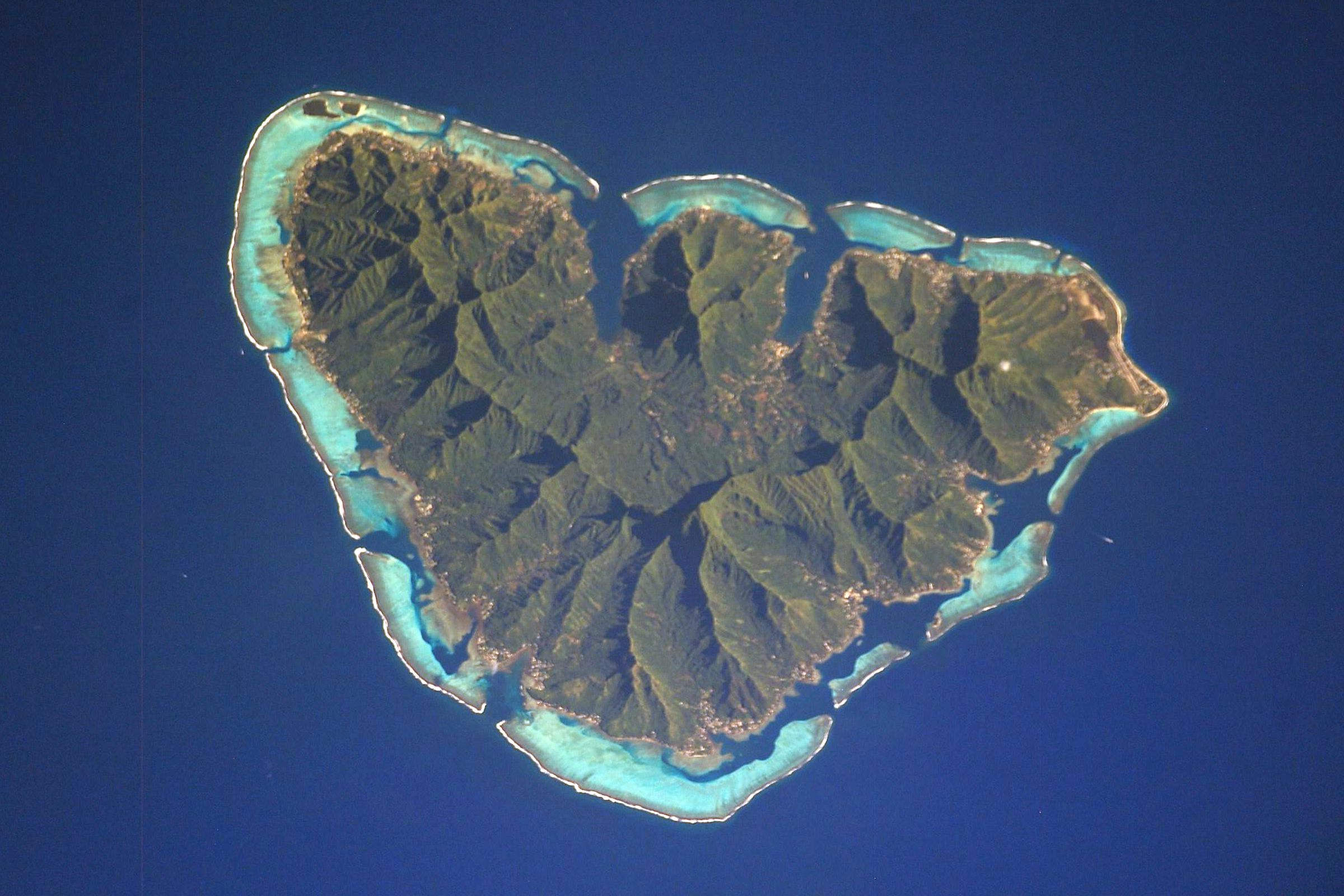
- Moʻorea, the island on which ʻĀfareaitu is located

- Location within French Polynesia
- Location of ʻĀfareaitu
- Coordinates: 17°32′58″S 149°47′26″W
- Country: France
- Overseas collectivity: French Polynesia
- Subdivision: Windward Islands
- Commune: Moʻorea-Maiʻao
- Population (2022): 4,055
- Time zone: UTC−10:00

ʻĀfareaitu is an associated commune on the island of Moʻorea, in French Polynesia. It is part of the commune Moʻorea-Maiʻao. According to the census in 2022, it had a population of 4,055.
