= Maharepa =

Village in French Polynesia

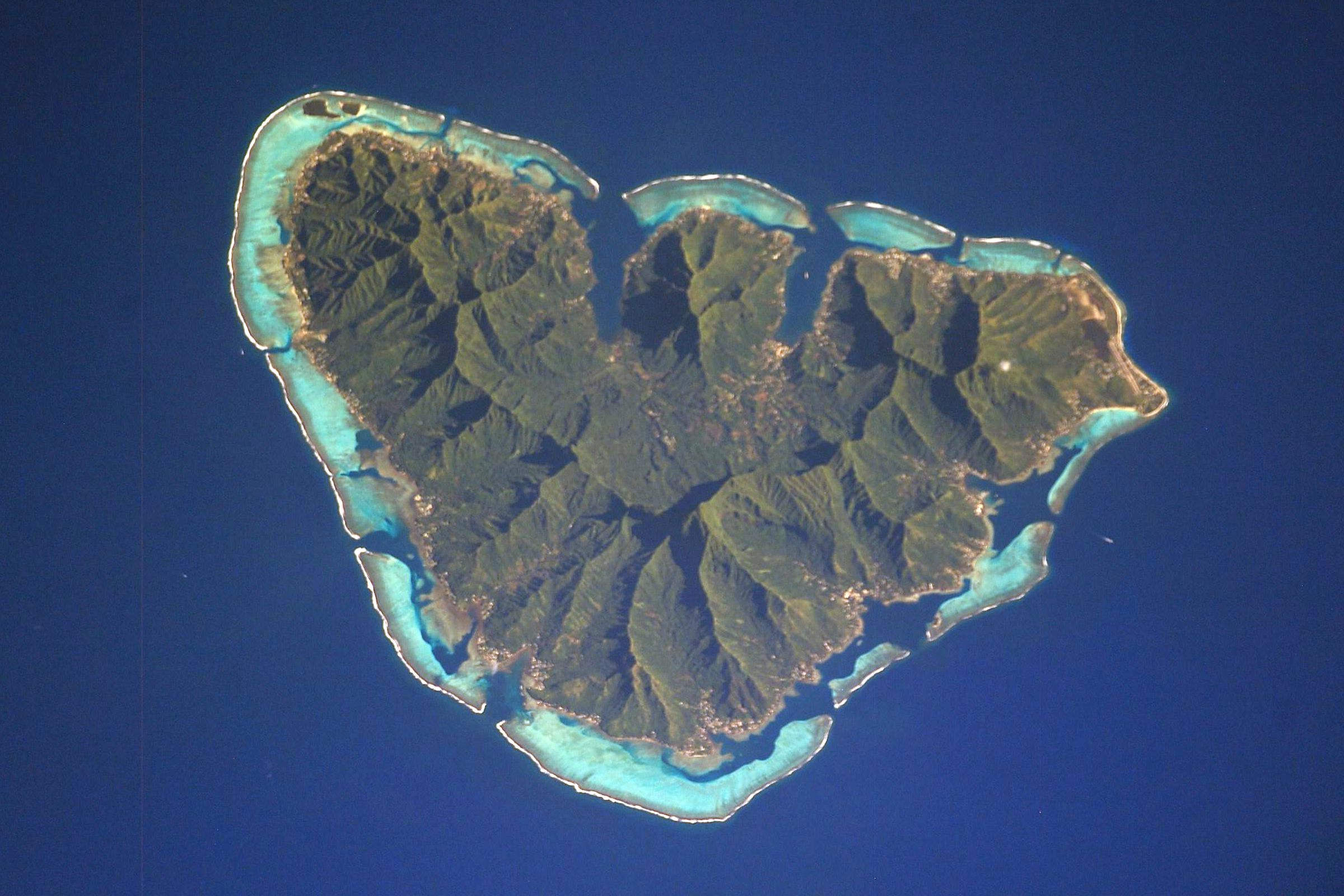
- Mo'orea, the island on which Maharepa is located.
- Interactive map of Maharepa
- Coordinates: 17°28′59″S 149°47′52″W

Population (2007)
  - Total: 4,244

Maharepa is a village on the island of Mo'orea, in French Polynesia.
