= Haapiti =

Ha'apiti
- Associated commune of Moʻorea-Maiʻao
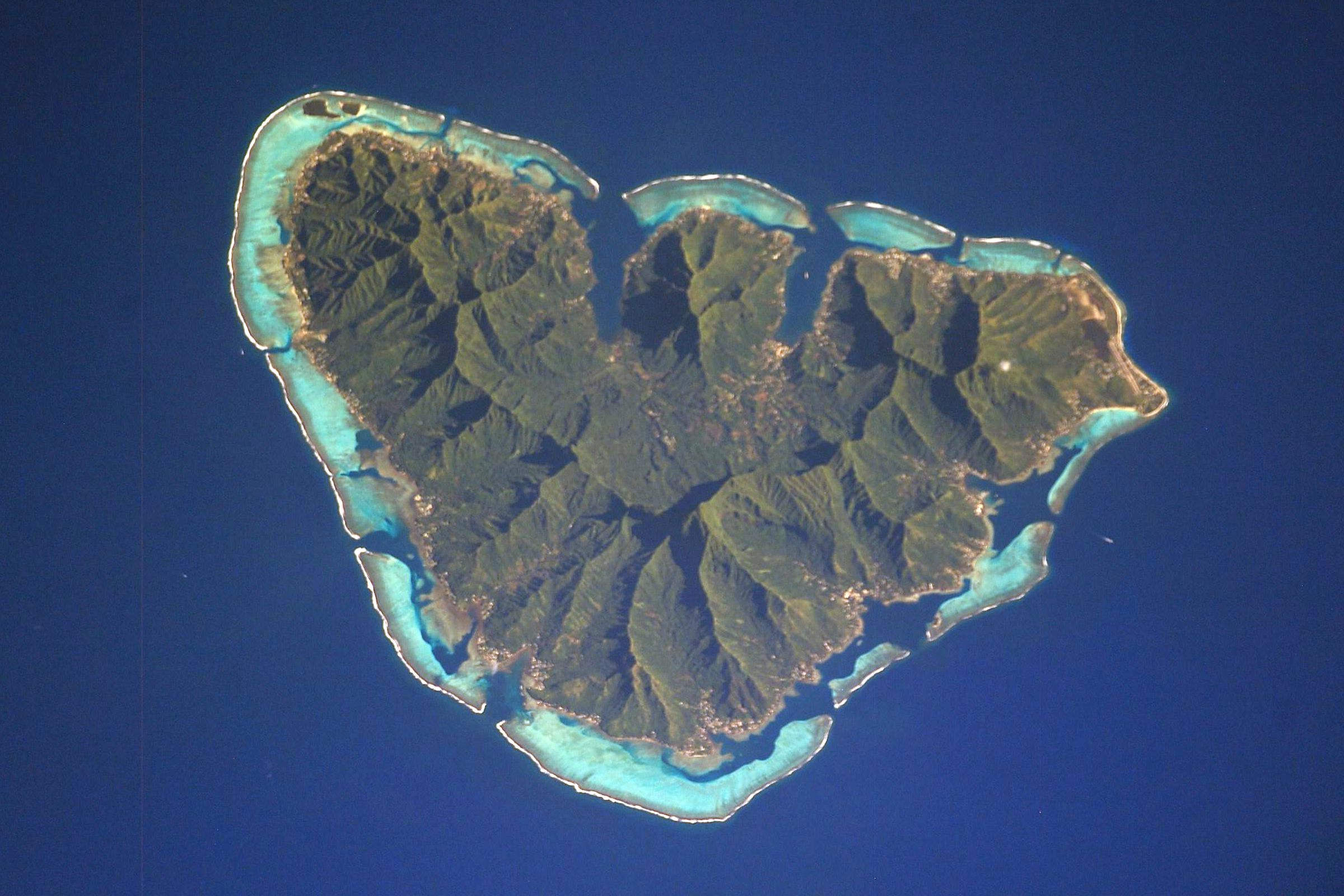
- Moʻorea, the island on which Ha'apiti is located

- Location within French Polynesia
- Location of Ha'apiti
- Coordinates: 17°32′58″S 149°47′26″W
- Country: France
- Overseas collectivity: French Polynesia
- Subdivision: Windward Islands
- Commune: Moʻorea-Maiʻao
- Elevation: 9 m (30 ft)
- Population (2022): 4,109
- Time zone: UTC−10:00

Ha'apiti is an associated commune on the island of Mo'orea, in French Polynesia. It is part of the commune Moorea-Maiao. According to the 2022 census, it had a population of 4,109.
