= Papetoai =

Papetō'ai
- Associated commune of Moʻorea-Maiʻao
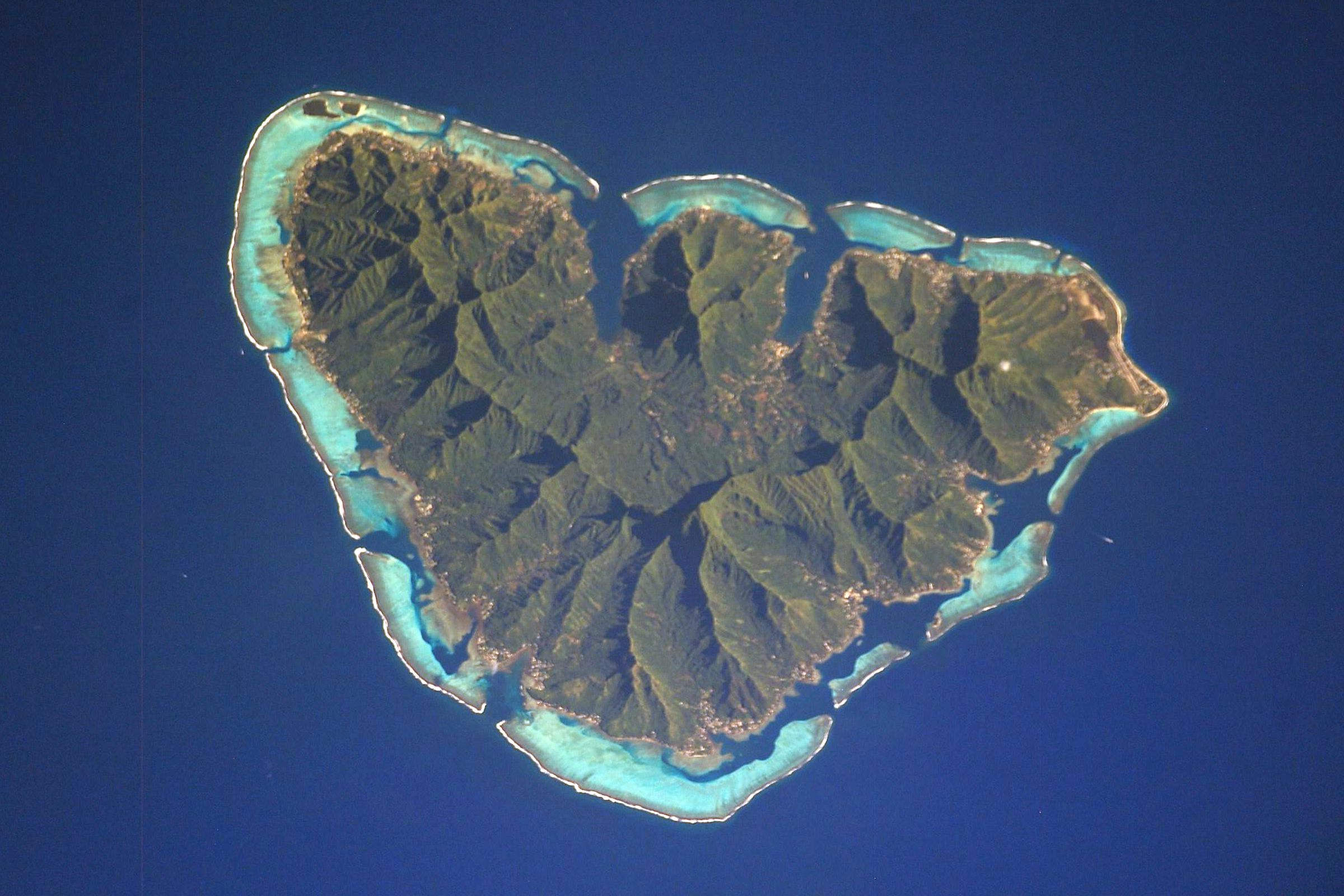
- Moʻorea, the island on which Papetō'ai is located

- Location within French Polynesia
- Location of Papetō'ai
- Coordinates: 17°29′44″S 149°52′22″W
- Country: France
- Overseas collectivity: French Polynesia
- Subdivision: Windward Islands
- Commune: Moʻorea-Maiʻao
- Elevation: 18 m (59 ft)
- Population (2022): 2,214
- Time zone: UTC−10:00

Papetō'ai is an associated commune on the island of Mo'orea, in French Polynesia. It is part of the commune Moorea-Maiao. According to the 2022 census, it had a population of 2,214.

== Geography ==
=== Climate ===
Papetō'ai has a tropical rainforest climate (Köppen climate classification Af). The average annual temperature in Papetō'ai is 25.8 °C (78.4 °F). The average annual rainfall is 3,108.3 mm (122.37 in) with December as the wettest month. The temperatures are highest on average in March, at around 27.0 °C (80.6 °F), and lowest in August, at around 24.3 °C (75.7 °F). The highest temperature ever recorded in Papetō'ai was 37.6 °C (99.7 °F) on 26 March 2022; the coldest temperature ever recorded was 14.5 °C (58.1 °F) on 4 July 1998.

Climate data for Papetō'ai (1991−2020 normals, extremes 1979−present)
| Month | Jan | Feb | Mar | Apr | May | Jun | Jul | Aug | Sep | Oct | Nov | Dec | Year |
|---|---|---|---|---|---|---|---|---|---|---|---|---|---|
| Record high °C (°F) | 36.5 (97.7) | 36.0 (96.8) | 37.6 (99.7) | 36.0 (96.8) | 36.2 (97.2) | 34.0 (93.2) | 32.5 (90.5) | 34.5 (94.1) | 34.5 (94.1) | 35.0 (95.0) | 34.5 (94.1) | 34.7 (94.5) | 37.6 (99.7) |
| Mean daily maximum °C (°F) | 30.7 (87.3) | 31.1 (88.0) | 31.6 (88.9) | 31.3 (88.3) | 30.3 (86.5) | 29.4 (84.9) | 29.0 (84.2) | 28.9 (84.0) | 29.3 (84.7) | 29.8 (85.6) | 30.3 (86.5) | 30.4 (86.7) | 30.2 (86.4) |
| Daily mean °C (°F) | 26.6 (79.9) | 26.8 (80.2) | 27.0 (80.6) | 26.8 (80.2) | 25.9 (78.6) | 24.9 (76.8) | 24.5 (76.1) | 24.3 (75.7) | 24.7 (76.5) | 25.3 (77.5) | 26.0 (78.8) | 26.3 (79.3) | 25.8 (78.4) |
| Mean daily minimum °C (°F) | 22.5 (72.5) | 22.5 (72.5) | 22.4 (72.3) | 22.2 (72.0) | 21.5 (70.7) | 20.5 (68.9) | 20.0 (68.0) | 19.8 (67.6) | 20.2 (68.4) | 20.9 (69.6) | 21.6 (70.9) | 22.3 (72.1) | 21.4 (70.5) |
| Record low °C (°F) | 18.4 (65.1) | 18.7 (65.7) | 19.5 (67.1) | 18.4 (65.1) | 17.4 (63.3) | 15.1 (59.2) | 14.5 (58.1) | 15.0 (59.0) | 16.0 (60.8) | 16.5 (61.7) | 17.4 (63.3) | 17.6 (63.7) | 14.5 (58.1) |
| Average precipitation mm (inches) | 410.1 (16.15) | 376.2 (14.81) | 277.9 (10.94) | 228.2 (8.98) | 205.5 (8.09) | 170.3 (6.70) | 139.2 (5.48) | 144.4 (5.69) | 183.0 (7.20) | 226.6 (8.92) | 272.6 (10.73) | 474.3 (18.67) | 3,108.3 (122.37) |
| Average precipitation days (≥ 1.0 mm) | 17.5 | 16.2 | 14.2 | 14.5 | 12.5 | 11.4 | 10.6 | 9.8 | 11.3 | 13.0 | 15.6 | 19.9 | 166.4 |
Source: Météo-France
