= Cook's Bay (Moorea) =

Coordinates: 17.495°S 149.822°W

Cook's Bay (also known as Paopao Bay) is a 3-kilometre-long (1.9 mi) bay on the north coast of the island of Mo'orea, Tahiti. It is one of the two principal bays on the island. The other, Opunohu Bay is 4 km (2.5 mi) west of Cooks Bay.

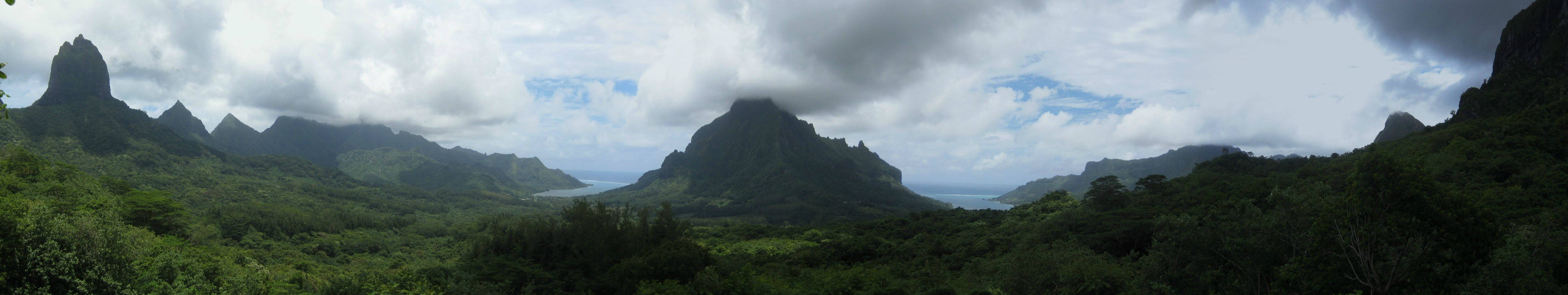
A panorama view from Belvedere Point on Mount Tohivea, looking towards Opunohu Bay on the left, and Cook's Bay on the right, separated by Mou'a Rotui (899 m; 2,949 ft). Mou'a Roa (880 m; 2,890 ft) is on the left.

Pao Pao, the largest village on Mo'orea, lies at the head of Cook's Bay. Mo'orea is a tourist destination, and several hotels lie on the shore of the bay. The University of California, Berkeley maintains the Richard B. Gump South Pacific Research Station on the west coast of Cook's Bay.

Cook's Bay was named after the British explorer James Cook. Cook's party visited Mo'orea during Cook's first voyage in 1769 to observe the transit of Venus, but Cook himself did not visit the island until his third voyage. He landed in Opunohu Bay on 30 September 1777, but later visited what is now Cook's Bay by land.
