= Pito Hiti =

Mountain in Tahiti, French Polynesia

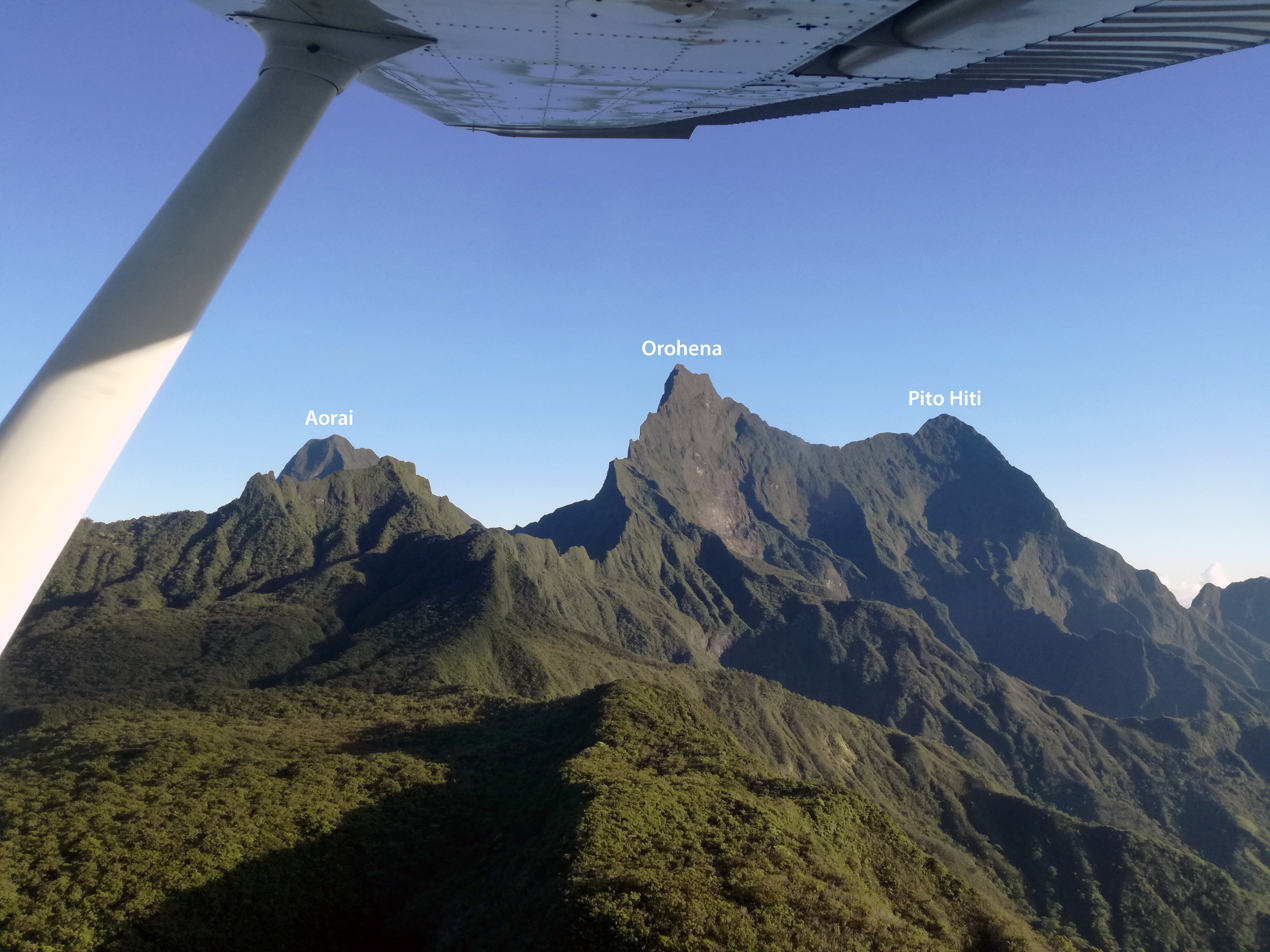
- Aerial view with Piti Hiti on the right

Highest point
- Elevation: 2,110 m (6,920 ft)
- Coordinates: 17.614278°S 149.46386°W

Geography
- Location: French Polynesia

Geology
- Volcanic zone: Society hotspot

Pito Hiti or Pito Iti is the second highest peak on the island of Tahiti in French Polynesia. Its elevation is 2,110 metres (6,923 ft).

The name Pito Hiti comes from hiti, meaning in Tahitian "to get up", but since the "h" is not pronounced in French, his name is sometimes written Pito Iti which literally means in Tahitian "little navel".

According to Tahitian legend the island was once inundated, with only Pito Hiti above the waves.
