= Pao Pao =

Associated commune on the island of Moʻorea, in French Polynesia

- Associated commune of Moʻorea-Maiʻao
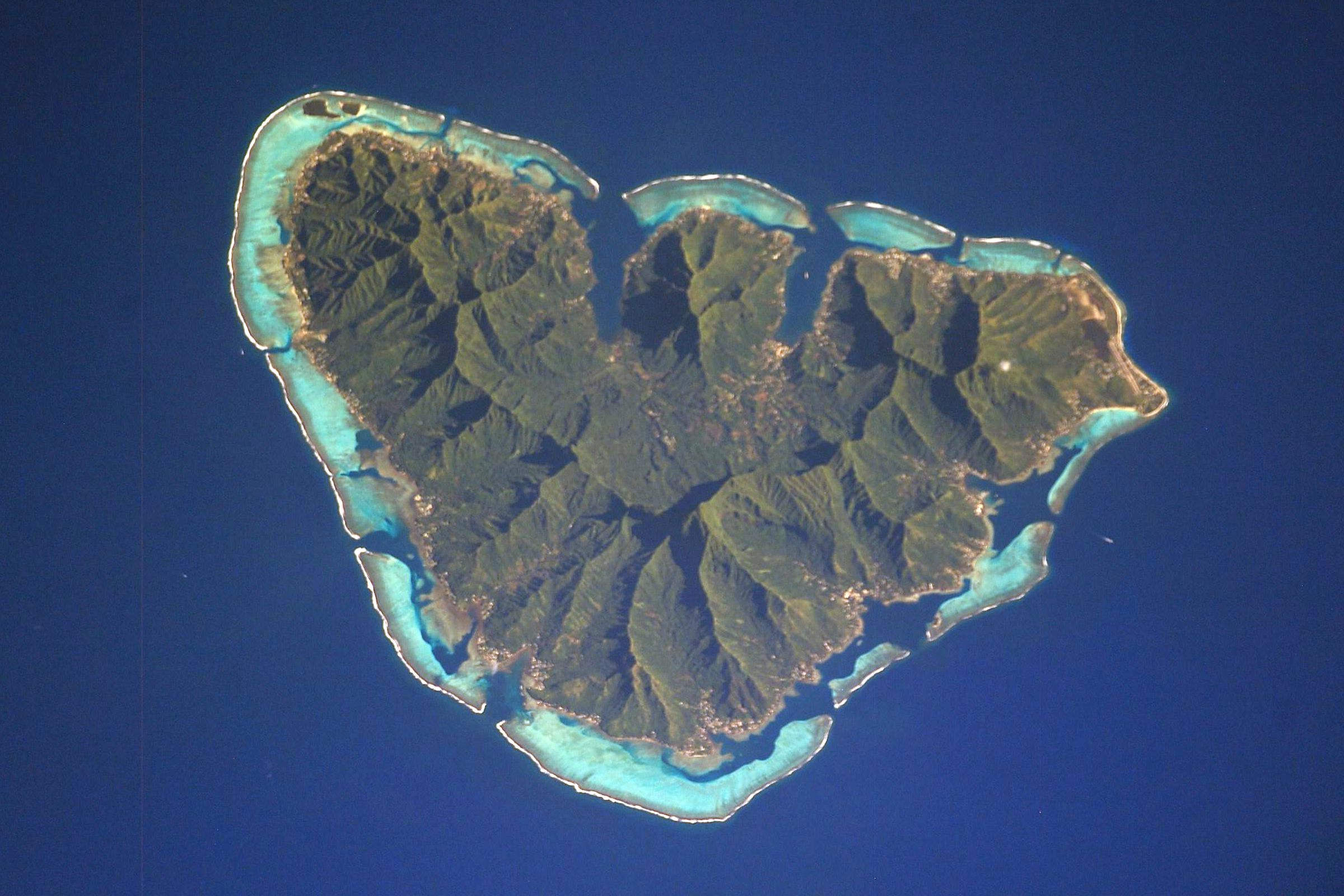
- Moʻorea, the island on which Pao Pao is located

- Location within French Polynesia
- Location of Pao Pao
- Coordinates: 17°30′36″S 149°49′20″W
- Country: France
- Overseas collectivity: French Polynesia
- Subdivision: Windward Islands
- Commune: Moʻorea-Maiʻao
- Population (2022): 4,895
- Time zone: UTC−10:00

Pao Pao is an associated commune on the island of Moʻorea, in French Polynesia. It is part of the commune Moʻorea-Maiʻao. According to the census in 2022, it had a population of 4,895. It is the largest village in Moʻorea.

== History ==
The Pao Pao area, like the rest of Moʻorea, was first settled by Polynesians from Samoa and Tonga in 200 CE. James Cook arrived in Moʻorea during his first voyage and made contact with the local Polynesians. Cook's Bay, the bay on which Pao Pao is located, was named in his honor.

== Transport ==
Residents of Pao Pao often take the Moʻorea Airport to travel to other islands in French Polynesia. The nearby island of Tahiti is a 45-minute ferry ride from Moʻorea, which draws a fair amount of tourism to the area.

== Geography ==
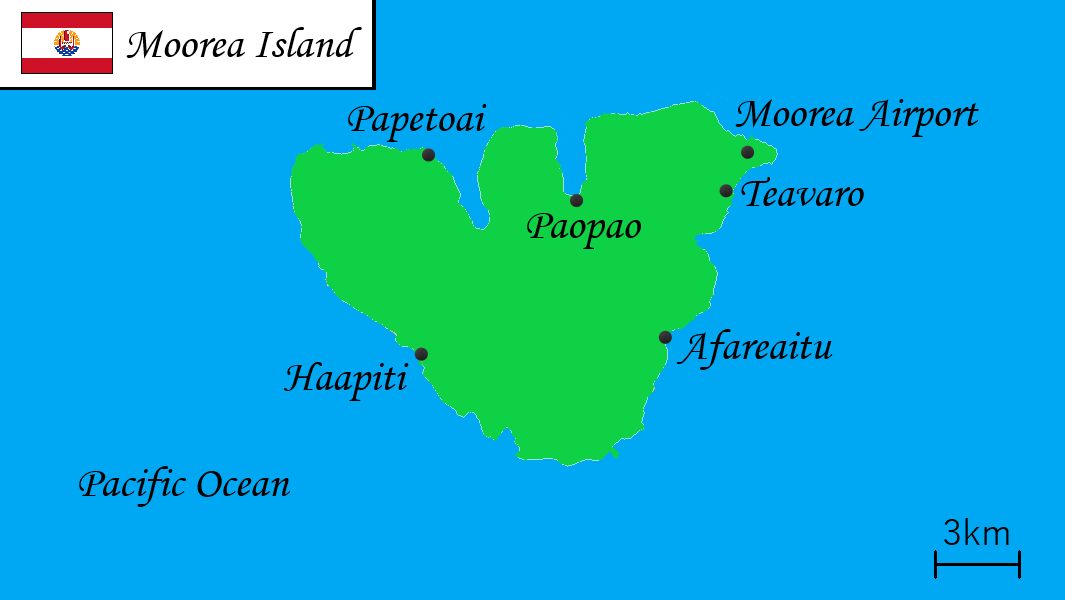
Paopao is located on the center of the Moʻorea Island.

Pao Pao is located at the bottom of Cook's Bay on Moʻorea. It is surrounded by many mountains and flat land is limited.

=== Climate ===
Pao Pao has a tropical rainforest climate (Köppen climate classification Af). The average annual temperature in Pao Pao is 26.0 °C (78.8 °F). The average annual rainfall is 2,945.6 mm (115.97 in) with December as the wettest month. The temperatures are highest on average in March, at around 27.2 °C (81.0 °F), and lowest in August, at around 24.5 °C (76.1 °F). The highest temperature ever recorded in Pao Pao was 35.5 °C (95.9 °F) on 23 December 2009; the coldest temperature ever recorded was 14.2 °C (57.6 °F) on 10 August 2008.

Climate data for Pao Pao (1991−2020 normals, extremes 1997−present)
Month	Jan	Feb	Mar	Apr	May	Jun	Jul	Aug	Sep	Oct	Nov	Dec	Year
Record high °C (°F)	34.1 (93.4)	34.7 (94.5)	34.8 (94.6)	34.8 (94.6)	34.9 (94.8)	33.0 (91.4)	31.7 (89.1)	32.4 (90.3)	33.2 (91.8)	34.4 (93.9)	34.6 (94.3)	35.5 (95.9)	35.5 (95.9)
Mean daily maximum °C (°F)	30.8 (87.4)	31.1 (88.0)	31.5 (88.7)	31.2 (88.2)	30.2 (86.4)	29.4 (84.9)	28.9 (84.0)	28.8 (83.8)	29.1 (84.4)	29.7 (85.5)	30.4 (86.7)	30.7 (87.3)	30.2 (86.4)
Daily mean °C (°F)	26.8 (80.2)	27.0 (80.6)	27.2 (81.0)	26.9 (80.4)	26.1 (79.0)	25.2 (77.4)	24.7 (76.5)	24.5 (76.1)	24.9 (76.8)	25.5 (77.9)	26.3 (79.3)	26.8 (80.2)	26.0 (78.8)
Mean daily minimum °C (°F)	22.9 (73.2)	23.0 (73.4)	22.9 (73.2)	22.7 (72.9)	21.9 (71.4)	21.1 (70.0)	20.6 (69.1)	20.2 (68.4)	20.7 (69.3)	21.3 (70.3)	22.2 (72.0)	22.8 (73.0)	21.9 (71.4)
Record low °C (°F)	17.9 (64.2)	18.1 (64.6)	18.5 (65.3)	18.1 (64.6)	17.3 (63.1)	16.0 (60.8)	15.9 (60.6)	14.2 (57.6)	16.1 (61.0)	16.9 (62.4)	17.5 (63.5)	19.1 (66.4)	14.2 (57.6)
Average precipitation mm (inches)	423.1 (16.66)	363.2 (14.30)	256.2 (10.09)	215.5 (8.48)	183.6 (7.23)	167.0 (6.57)	126.8 (4.99)	119.6 (4.71)	170.3 (6.70)	229.9 (9.05)	267.3 (10.52)	423.1 (16.66)	2,945.6 (115.97)
Average precipitation days (≥ 1.0 mm)	16.1	14.5	13.0	13.1	12.0	10.0	9.4	9.4	10.5	13.3	14.0	17.4	152.7
Source: Météo-France

== Economy ==
Pao Pao is known for being the home to the Moʻorea Juice Factory, which offers tours on how the juice is made and sells juice in a nearby store. The Supermarché (which is supermarket in French) of Pao Pao is a major store in the village.
