= Society hotspot =

Pacific volcanic hotspot

Coordinates: 17°32′S 149°50′W

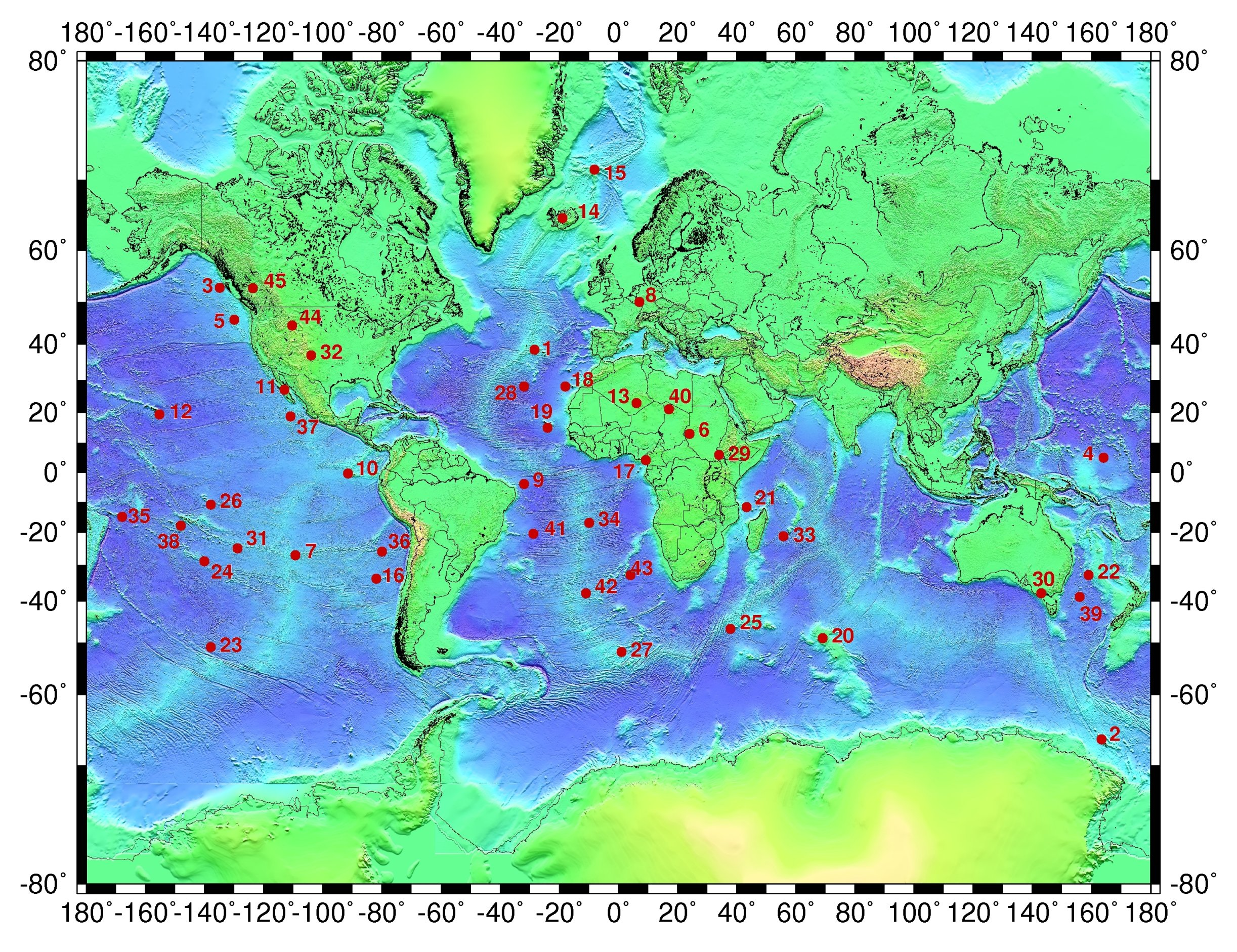
The Society hotspot is marked 38 on the map.

The Society hotspot is a volcanic hotspot in the south Pacific Ocean which is responsible for the formation of the Society Islands, an archipelago of fourteen volcanic islands and atolls spanning around 720 kilometres (450 mi) of the ocean. These islands, which include Tahiti, Mo'orea and Bora bora, range in age from 4.5 million years to less than 1 million years.

== Formation ==
There are currently two main hypotheses concerning the cause of volcanic activity. The conventional view is that the hotspot is underlain by a mantle plume which has transported hot material from the lower mantle to the surface, creating the chain as the Pacific Plate has moved northwest over the plume.

Several lines of evidence support this interpretation. Age progression along the chain is consistent with estimates of the velocity of plate motion. Seismic anomalies have been observed in the upper mantle and found to extend into the uppermost lower mantle, implying that the passage of hot material from the lower to upper mantle is not hindered by the transition zone. Magnetotelluric imaging has found higher conductivity in the upper mantle under the active area southeast of Tahiti consistent with anomalously hot rising material.

There are two competing versions of the mantle plume model. One version posits a narrow, discreet plume feeding only the Society hotspot. The other proposes a superplume with narrow conduits supplying several hotspots in the south Pacific. Evidence for the former model includes magnetotelluric imaging which finds conductivity anomalies of less than 150 kilometres (93 mi) in radius indicating a plume of limited extent and seismic imaging of the transition zone under the Society hotspot which shows a thinned area of less than 500 kilometres (310 mi) implying that the thermal flux from lower to upper mantle is on the scale of a plume rather than a superplume. Evidence for the latter model includes seismic imaging of the lower mantle which reveals a large-scale low-velocity anomaly from the base of the mantle to around 1,000 kilometres (620 mi) depth, small-scale anomalies in the upper mantle which may be narrow plumes generated by the South Pacific superswell and intermittent volcanic activity in South Pacific hotspots which contrasts with the persistent volcanism expected for individual plumes.

Clouard and Bonneville 2001 have argued that certain features of the Society hotspot, such as the lack of an initial flood basalt at the old end of the chain, short-lived volcanic activity, and petrological and geochemical analysis of the lavas which reveals a number of shallow-source components, are inconsistent with the plume model and have proposed a tectonic origin. According to this model, the Society and other volcanic chains in the south Pacific result from a system of fissures caused by intraplate stresses related to thermal contraction of the lithosphere, subduction-induced flow of the asthenosphere, and changes in the configuration of plate boundaries which have enabled pre-existing melt in the crust and shallow mantle to escape to the surface. The timing of volcanic activity and orientation of the chain, both of which coincide closely with major alterations in plate boundary configurations and consequent changes in the lithospheric stress field and direction of asthenospheric counterflow, support this model.

Some of the above features, however, can be accommodated by the plume model. The lack of initial flood basalt and short-lived activity, for example, are consistent with some versions of the superplume model which propose small-scale intermittent "plumelets" generated by the superplume, and the petrology and geochemistry of the lavas may be due to subducted oceanic crust being sampled by the plume.

== See also ==
- Arago hotspot
- Rarotonga hotspot
- Tarava Seamounts
