= Moʼorea =

Island in French Polynesia

Moʻorea
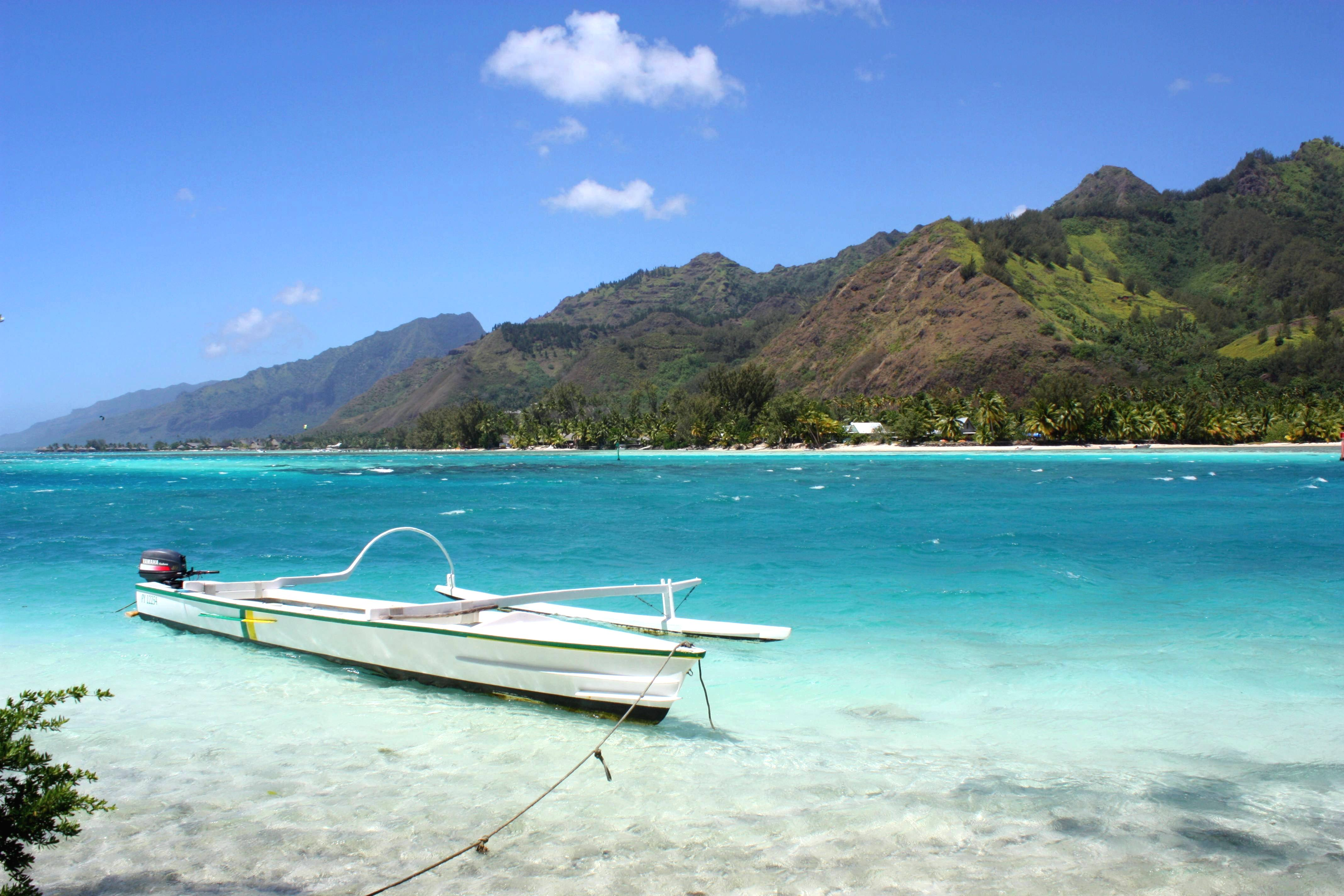
- View of Moʻorea

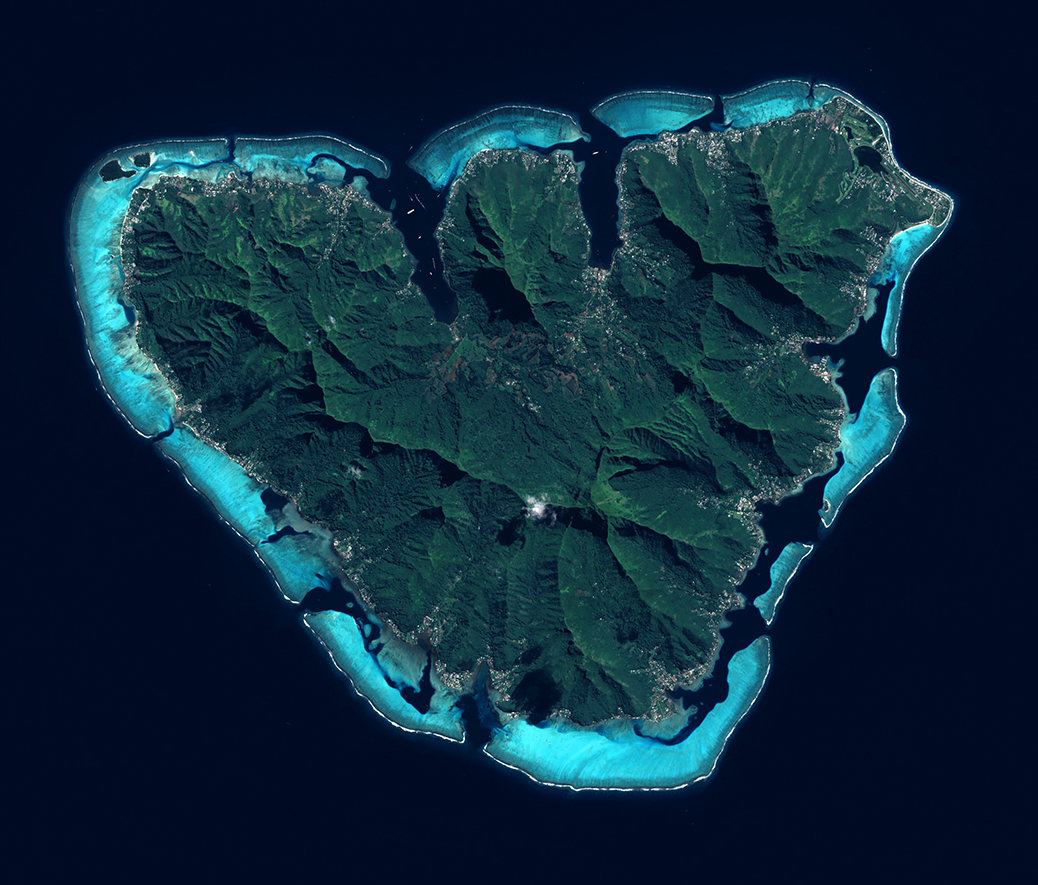
- Moorea as seen from Sentinel 2

Geography
- Location: Pacific Ocean
- Coordinates: 17°32′06″S 149°50′06″W
- Archipelago: Society Islands
- Area: 134 km^{2} (52 sq mi)
- Highest elevation: 1,207 m (3960 ft)
- Highest point: Mont Tohiveʻa

Administration
- France
- Overseas collectivity: French Polynesia
- Administrative subdivision: Windward Islands
- Commune: Moʻorea-Maiʻao
- Capital city: ʻĀfareaitu
- Largest settlement: Pao Pao–Maharepa (4,244 inhabitants)

Demographics
- Population: 16,191 (Aug. 2007 census)
- Pop. density: 121/km^{2} (313/sq mi)

Ramsar Wetland
- Official name: Lagon de Moʻorea
- Designated: 15 September 2008
- Reference no.: 1834

Moʼorea (English: /ˌmoʊ.oʊˈreɪ.ɑː/ or /ˈmoʊ.oʊreɪ/; Tahitian: Moʼoreʼa, [moʔore(ʔ)a]), also spelled Moorea, is a volcanic island in French Polynesia lying 17 kilometres (11 mi) northwest of Tahiti. Moʼorea and Tahiti are the largest members of the Windward Islands, a group that is part of the larger Society Islands archipelago.

Moʼoreʼa means 'yellow lizard' in Tahitian: Moʼo = lizard; Reʼa (from reʼareʼa) = yellow. An older name for the island is ʼAimeho, sometimes spelled ʼAimeo or ʼEimeo (among other spellings that early visitors used before Tahitian spelling was standardized). Early Western colonists and voyagers also referred to Moʼorea as York Island or Santo Domingo.

== History ==
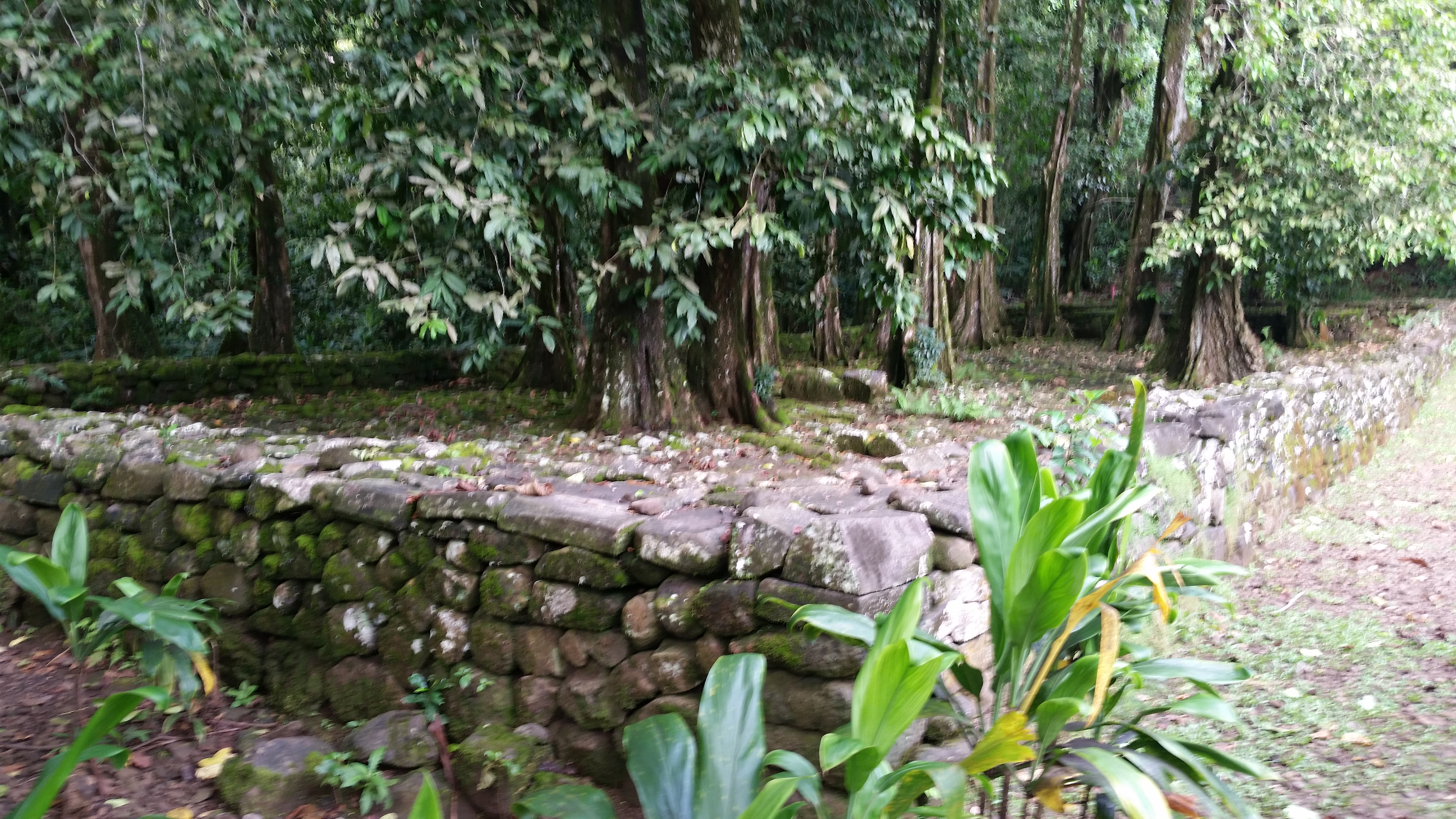
Marae Tiʼi-rua

=== Prehistory ===
According to recent archaeological evidence, the Society Islands were probably settled from Samoa and Tonga around 200 CE.

Nine tribal principalities emerged in the enclosed valleys, which in turn were subdivided into individual clans. The stratified society was characterized by a hierarchical leadership whose elite combined both political and religious power. The leading families of Moʼorea remained linked by marriage and kinship for centuries with those of the neighboring island of Tahiti. These connections led to important alliances, but at other times were also the source of bloody conflicts.

Intensive research on the Ōpūnohu Valley, which continues to this day, initiated by Kenneth P. Emory in the 1920s and continued in the 1960s by archaeologist Roger C. Green of the University of Auckland, provides an exemplary picture of the evolution of Moʼorean society. The interaction between increasing population density and human modification of the environment resulted in major changes in the form of society.

The so-called Pre-Atiroʼo phase, before 1000 CE, is characterized by extensive clearing and cultivation of the valley slopes, which by the end of the period had led to erosion and the formation of alluvial soils. Society was not yet stratified, but was relatively homogeneous.

In the Atiroʼo period (1000–1650 CE), artificial cultivation terraces were built on the slopes and simple stone buildings, such as the Marae Tapauruʼuru. The remains of rectangular houses (fare haupape) and those with elongated oval floor plans (fare poteʼe), reserved for the power elite, indicate a strictly stratified and hierarchical form of society.

The later Marama period (1650–1788 CE) is marked by the conquest of the Ōpūnohu Valley by the chiefs (ariki) of the Marama tribe, originally settled on the coast, who succeeded in uniting all the other clans in the valley under their rule. In addition to a further increase in population, this phase also saw a lively construction activity of representative religious structures - large marae in the style of a step pyramid. Towards the end of this period, the Ōpūnohu Valley became a refuge for the Ariki who resisted European influence.

=== Early European influence ===
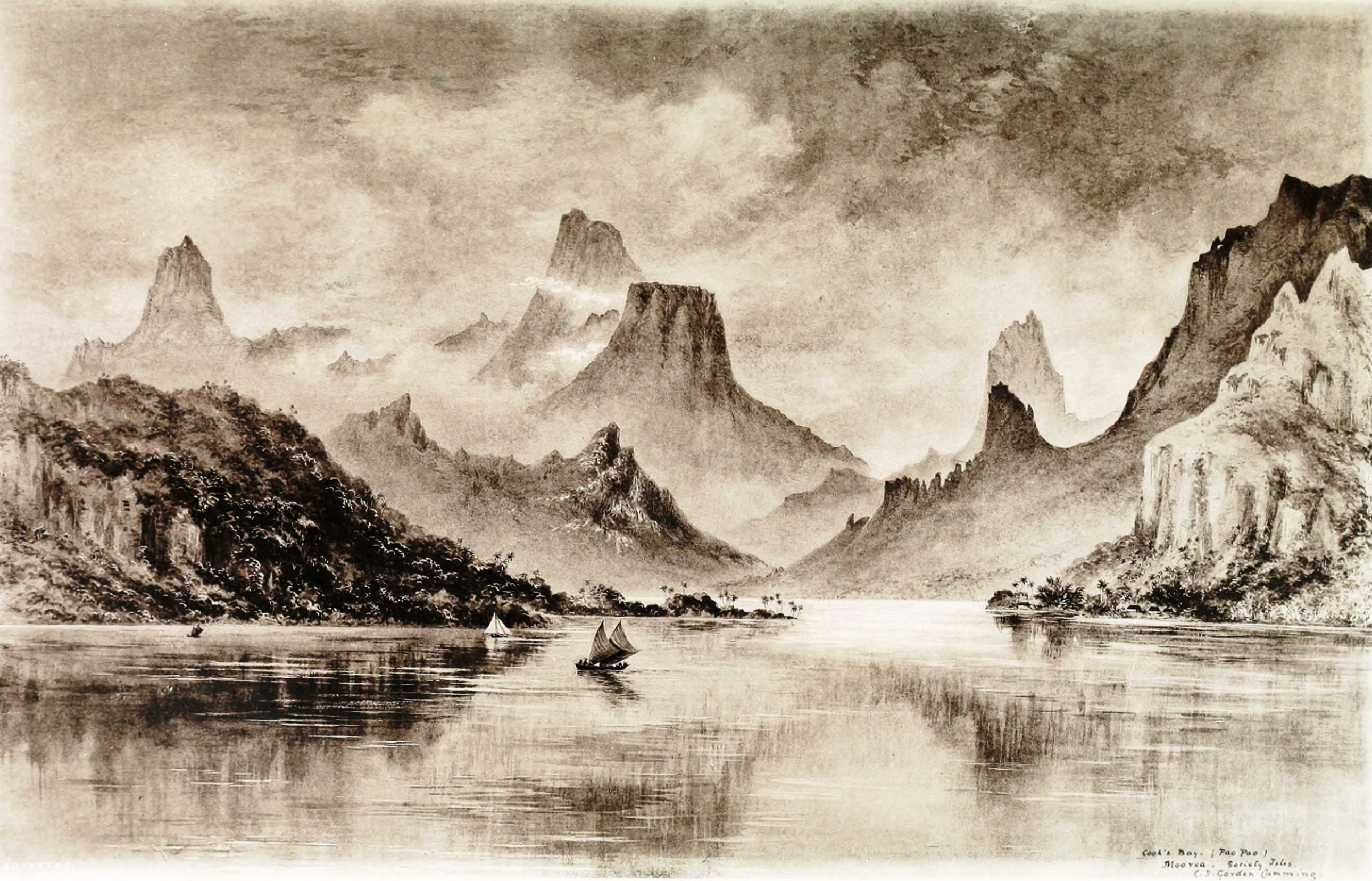
An 1882 books showing wonders of south Pacific: Cook's Bay

The first European to sight the island was Pedro Fernandes de Queirós, in 1606. The first European settlers arrived during the 18th century. The first Europeans to arrive on the island were the Englishmen Samuel Wallis and James Cook. Captain James Cook first landed on Tahiti, where he planned the 1769 Transit of Venus observed from Tahiti and Moʼorea. Cook arrived in October 1777 and obtained supplies on the island. This was the first contact the islanders had with Europeans, and on 6 October, one of Cook's goats was stolen while grazing ashore. After negotiations failed to return the goat, two large armed parties were sent ashore to set fire to houses and boats on the island. Eventually, the goat was returned, and Cook departed Mo'orea.

At Moʼorea, where Taʼaroa was chief, Cook first landed in ʼ Ōpūnohu Bay; Cook's Bay was later named in his honor. Spanish sailor Domingo de Bonechea visited it in 1774 and named it Santo Domingo.

It is likely that Teraura, a Polynesian woman who accompanied the Bounty mutineers to Pitcairn Island, was from Moʼorea.

The island was among those visited by the United States Exploring Expedition on its tour of the South Pacific in 1839.

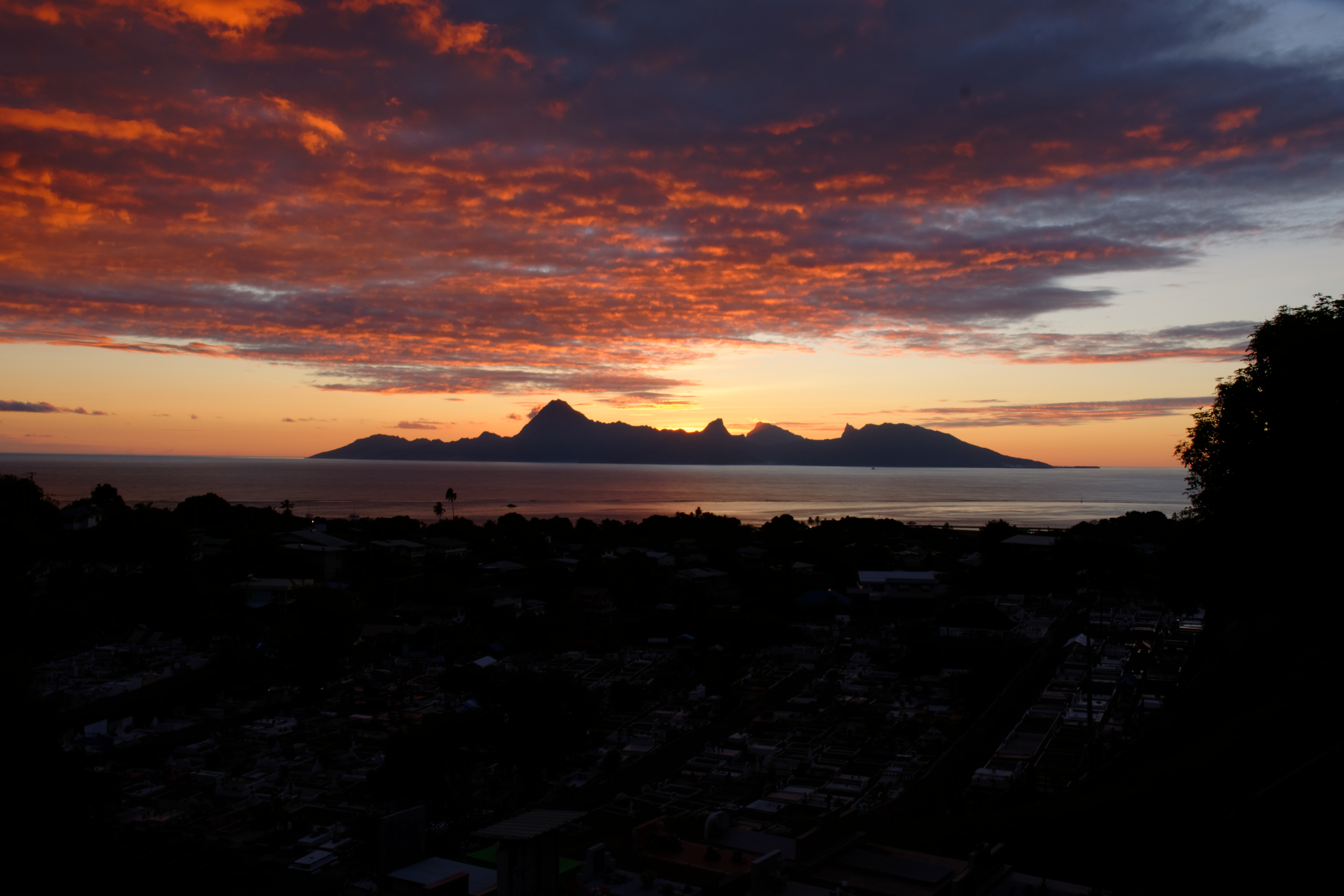
Sunset in Moʼorea as seen from Faa'a on Tahiti island to the east

Charles Darwin found inspiration for his theory regarding the formation of coral atolls when looking down upon Moʼorea while standing on a peak on Tahiti. He described it as a "picture in a frame", referring to the barrier reef encircling the island.

Don the Beachcomber lived here briefly in the late 1920s. His houseboat was destroyed by tropical cyclones after he moved it from Waikiki after 1947.

On 7 October 1967, construction was completed on the Moʼorea Airport, which opened the following month.

== Geography ==
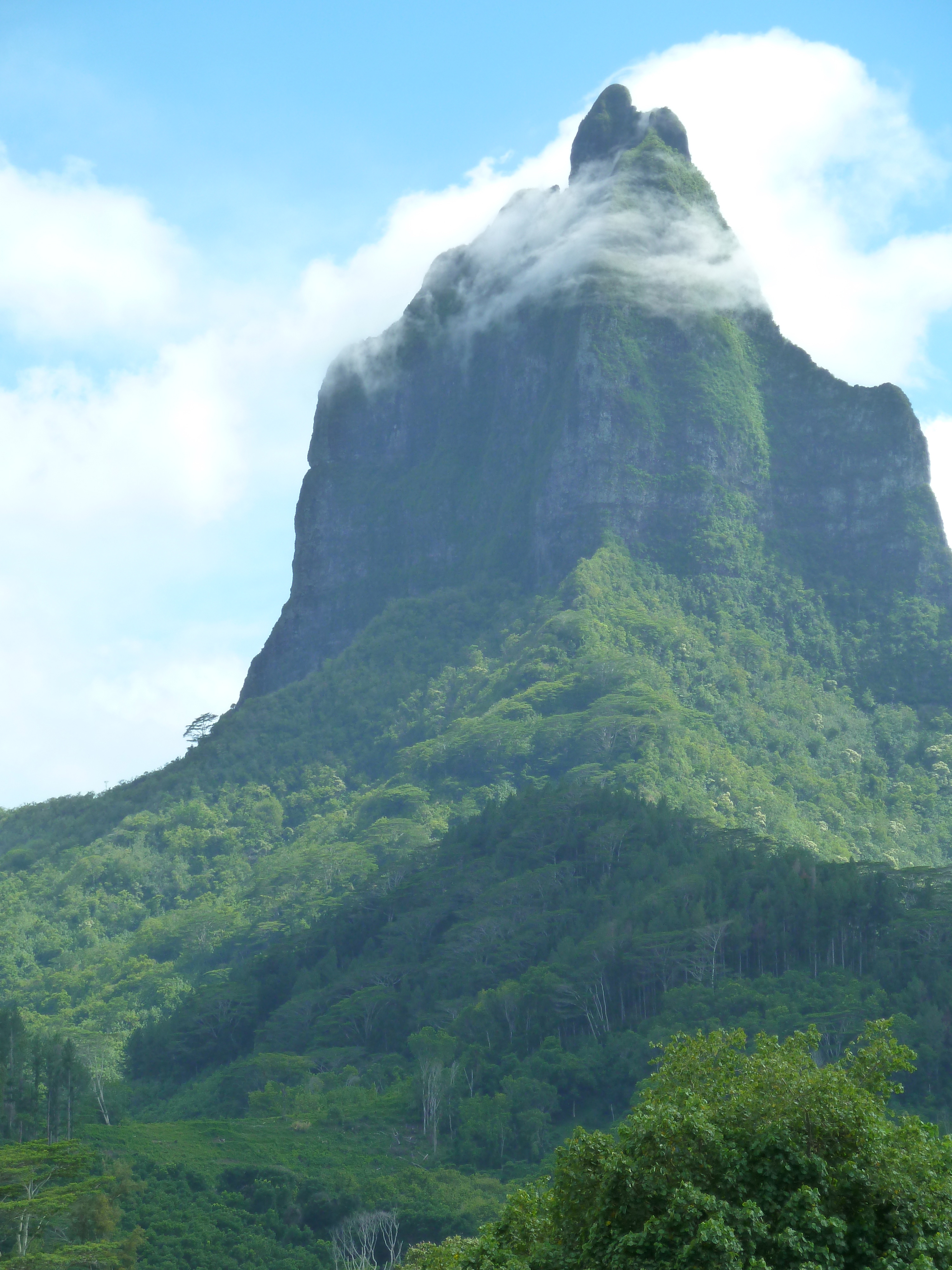
Mouʼaroa (Shark's Tooth), Moʼorea

Moʼorea is about 16 km (10 miles) across. There are two small, nearly symmetrical bays on the north shore. The one to the west is called ʼ Ōpūnohu Bay. The main surrounding communes of the bay are Pihaʼena in the east and Papetōʼai to the west. The one to the east is Cook's Bay, also called Pao Pao Bay since the largest commune of Moʼorea is at the head of the bay. The other communes are Pihaʼena to the west and busy Maharepa to the east. The highest point is Mount Tohivea, near the center of Moʼorea. It dominates the vista from the two bays and can be seen from Tahiti. Vaiʼare Bay is another small inlet, smaller than the two main bays, on the east shore where there is a ferry terminal with services to and from Tahiti.

=== Geology ===
Moʼorea formed as a shield volcano 1.5 to 2.5 million years ago, the action of the hotspot in the Earth's mantle which is responsible for all the Society Islands. Today, Moʼorea is an atoll where a coral reef surrounds the entire island forming a lagoon along the shoreline. The reef is relatively close, making the lagoon narrow with several navigable passages from the Pacific Ocean.

It is theorized that Moorea's bays were formerly river basins that filled during the Holocene sea-level rise.

=== Climate ===
Moʼorea is located in the Earth's tropical belt. The climate is tropical-warm and very humid, which favors the lush vegetation of the island. The average temperature ranges between 28 and 30 °C, with little difference between months. The rainiest months are from December to February; the (winter) months from July to September are drier. There is a constant wind that moderates temperatures. However, an occasional cyclone cannot be ruled out. In the 1982–83 season, a series of cyclones in the Society Islands also caused considerable property damage in Moʼorea.

=== Demographics ===
The island had a population of 14,226 inhabitants in the 2002 census, which increased to 17,718 in 2017, distributed in the associated communes of Afareaitu, Haʼapiti, Paopao, Papetōʼai, and Teavaro. Together with Maiʼao it forms the commune of Moʼorea-Maiʼao, which had 14,550 inhabitants by 2002.

The evolution of the number of inhabitants is known through population censuses conducted in the municipality since 1977. Since 2006, the INSEE has published the legal populations of the municipalities. Still, the law on local democracy of 27 February 2002, in its articles dedicated to the population census, introduced population censuses every five years in New Caledonia, French Polynesia, Mayotte, and the Wallis and Futuna islands, which was not the case before. For the municipality, the first comprehensive census under the new system was conducted in 2002; previous censuses took place in 1996, 1988, 1983, 1977, and 1971.

=== Bays ===
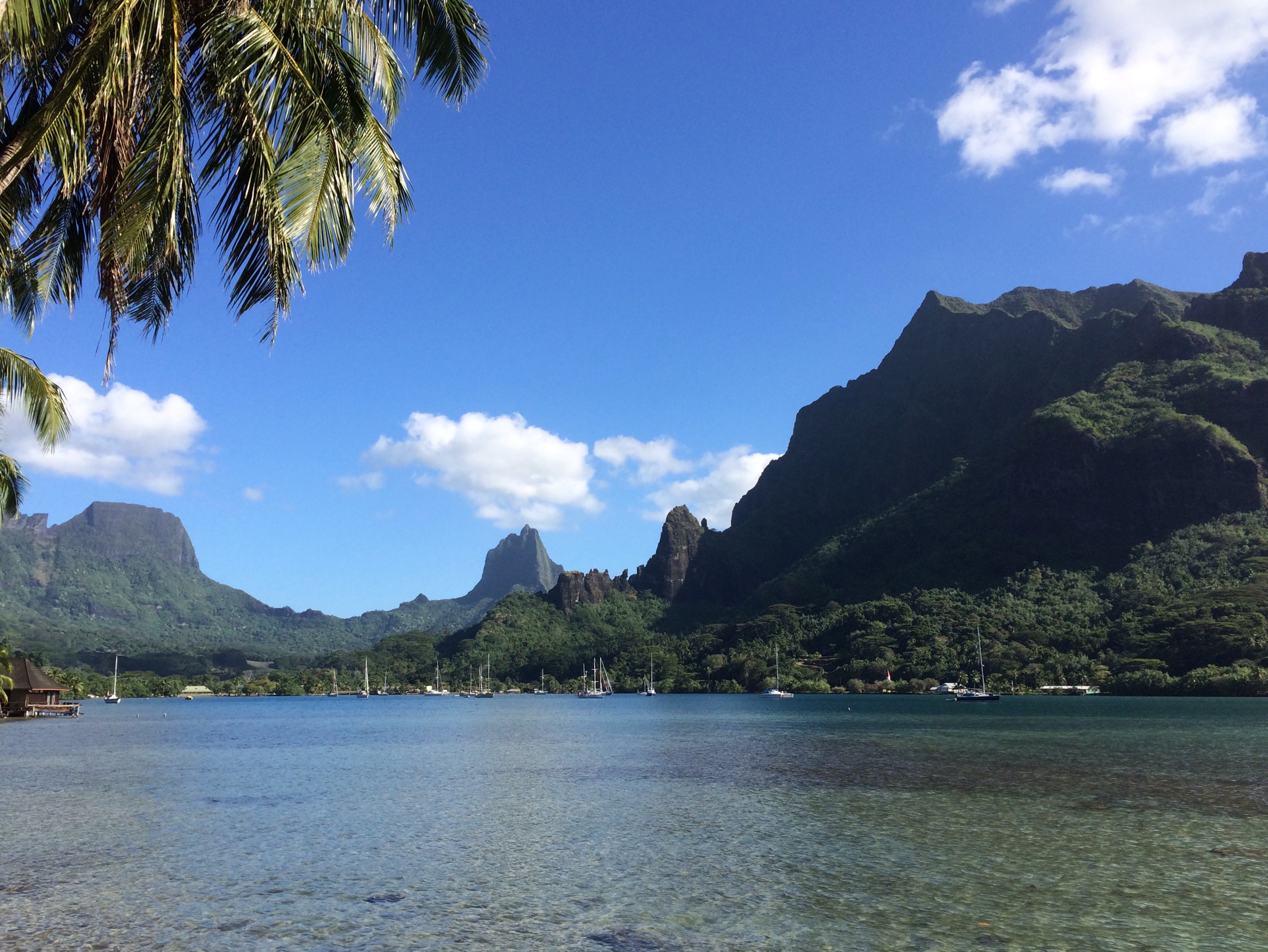
The famous Baie de Cook (Cooks Bay, Moorea)

The most famous sight of Moʼorea is Cook's Bay, where cruise ships regularly anchor. It is a deep blue bay that often has white sailing yachts, and in the background, the 830 metre (2723 feet) high Mount Mouaputa, this being probably the most photographed South Seas image. Next door is Ōpūnohu Bay, where many exterior shots of the 1984 movie The Bounty were filmed.

A steep, winding scenic road connects the two bays. In the once densely populated Ōpūnohu Valley, the indigenous Polynesians built numerous worship platforms (marae). The remains of these religious sites can be found everywhere off the road; some of them are signposted. Marae Titiroa is surrounded by banyan trees and was reconstructed in the late 1960s. A few hundred meters (yards) away is the multi-level Marae Ahu-o-Mahine, also well preserved. The trail continues to the Belvédère lookout overlooking Mount Rotui, Cook Bay, and Ōpūnohu Bay.

=== Flora and fauna ===
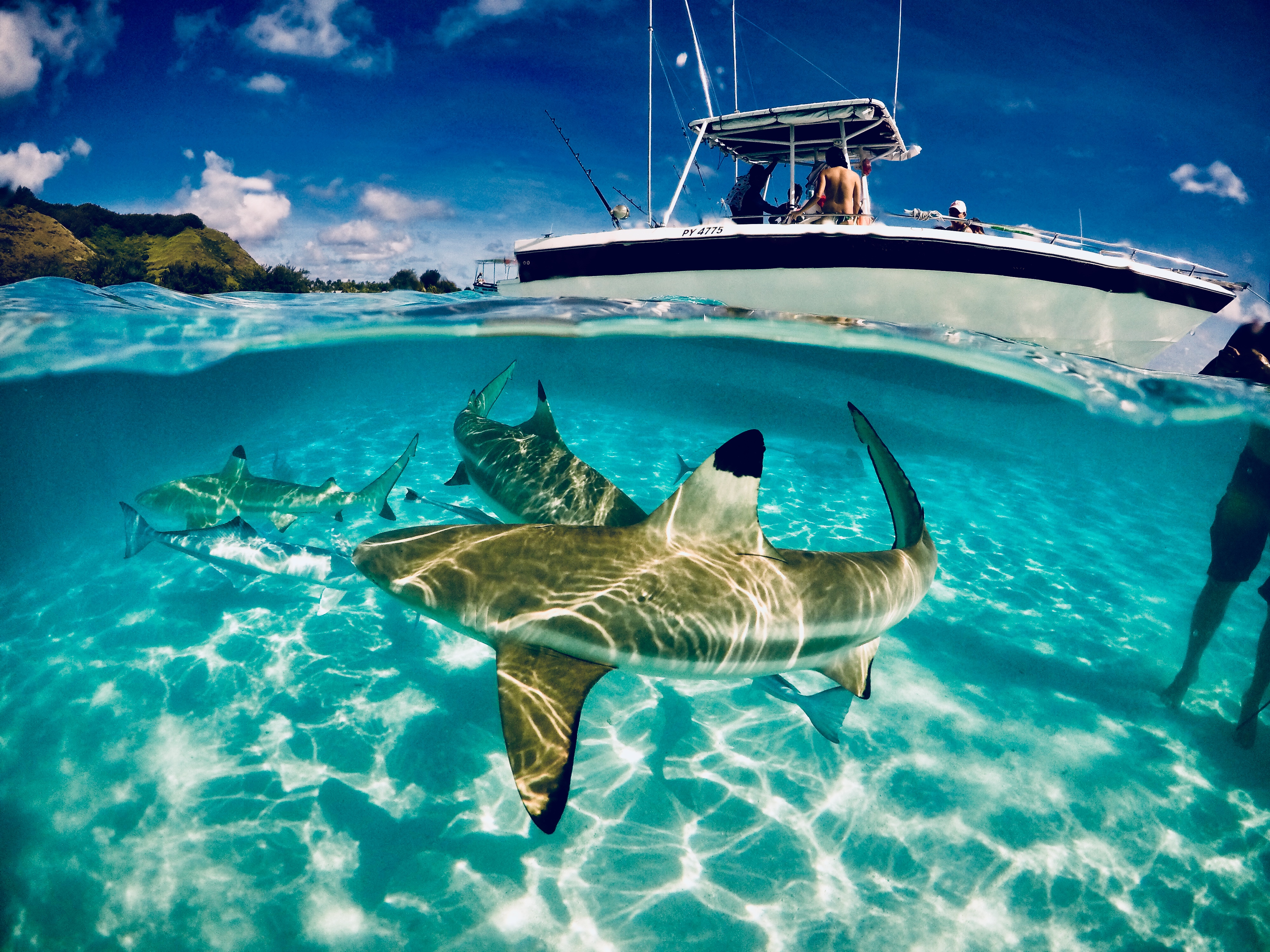
A shark (Carcharhinus melanopterus) in Moʼorea

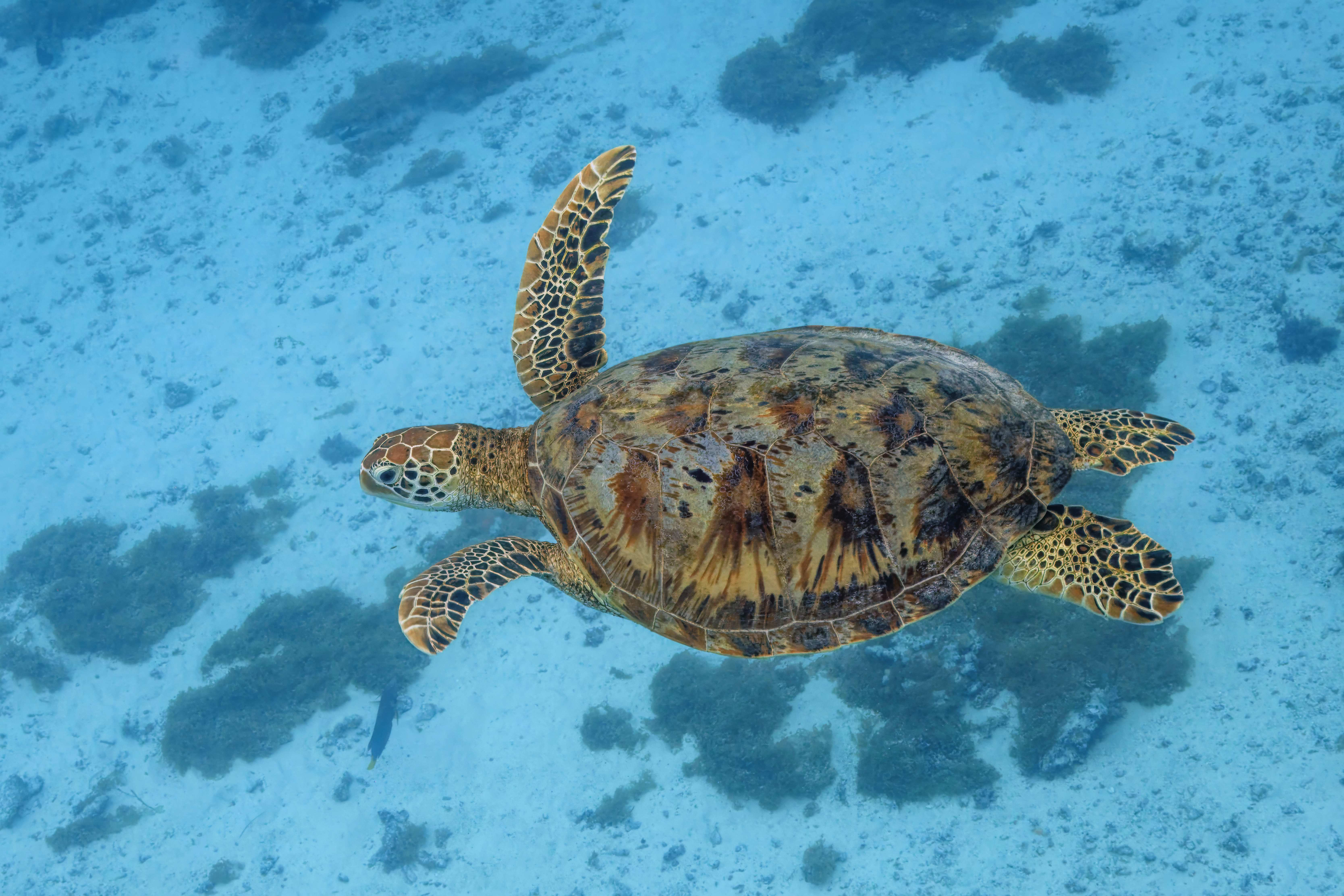
Green sea turtle (Chelonia mydas) swims in waters of Moorea

Due to the short distance to Tahiti and similarities in climate and soil structure, the flora of Moʼorea is comparable to that of Tahiti. The narrow coastal strip is dominated by anthropic plants, due to dense settlement and centuries of human use. However, significant remnants of the original plant communities have survived in the uninhabited and partially inaccessible interior of the island. The University of California at Berkeley maintains a permanent research institute on Moʼorea, Richard B. Gump Station, to study tropical biodiversity and interactions between cultural processes and the ecosystem. From 2008 to 2010, Moʼorea was the site of the Moʼorea Biocode project, the first comprehensive inventory of all macroscopic (>2mm) life in an ecosystem. They collected specimens, photographs, and genetic barcodes for over 5,700 species of plants, animals, and fungi.

Terrestrial mammals did not originally exist on the Society Islands; they were introduced exclusively by humans. Early Polynesian settlers brought dogs, pigs, chickens and the Polynesian rat as food animals, while Europeans introduced goats, cows, sheep and horses. The indigenous land animals are only insects, land crabs, snails, and lizards.

Many Moʼorean endemic species have gone extinct or been extirpated. The Polynesian tree snails of the genus Partula were largely wiped out after the rosy wolf snail was introduced in 1977, although captive and small refuge populations on Tahiti still exist. Until the 1980s, the Moʼorea reed warbler, an endemic species, was recorded on the island. This songbird was closely related to the Tahiti reed warbler and may have been displaced by the common myna. Another bird species extinct on Moʼorea is the Moʼorea sandpiper, of which only two specimens are known from 1777. The tree Glochidion nadeaudii is endemic to the island, growing in montane rain forests above 400 meters (1000 feet) elevation.

There are no animals on Moʼorea that are dangerous to humans. Sand fleas on the beach and mosquitoes, which are everywhere in the interior of the island, can be unpleasant. The marine fauna of the lagoon and coral reef is very rich in species. In addition to more than 500 species of coral fish, divers and snorkelers can observe numerous molluscs, echinoderms, and crustaceans of the tropical sea. Behind the fringing reef are sharks, rays, swordfish, and sea turtles. From July to October, humpback whales pass by the island. Whale and dolphin watching is offered to tourists. Titouan Bernicot established an organization to regrow the coral reefs of Mo'orea.

== Politics ==
The island is administratively part of the commune (municipality) of Moʼorea-Maiʼao, itself in the administrative subdivision of the Windward Islands. The main village is ʼĀfareaitu. The largest village is Pao Pao at the bottom of Cook's Bay. The second largest is Maharepa.

== Economy ==
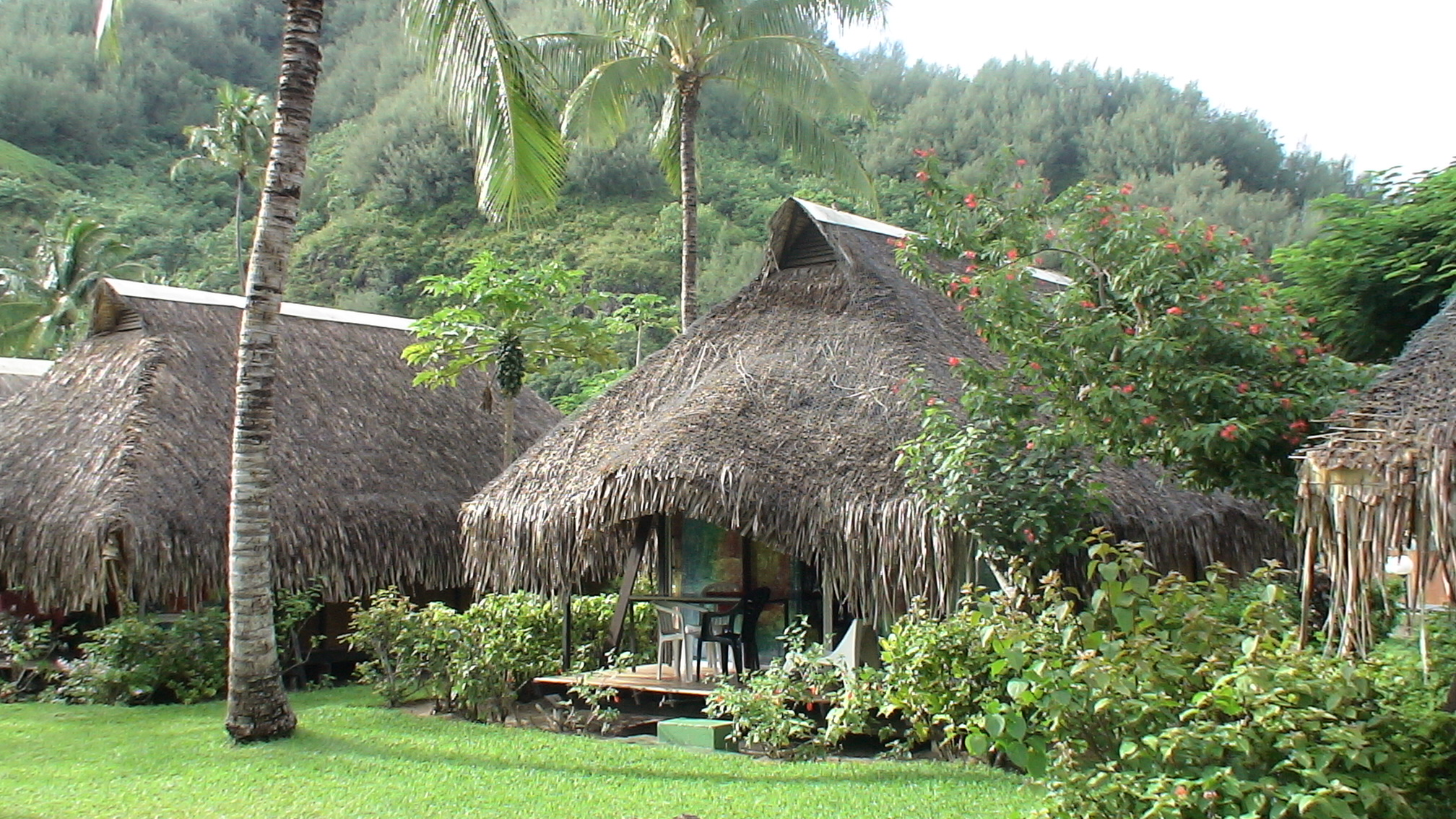
Bungalows of Hotel Hibiscus, Haurū Point, Moʼorea

This island is one of the main tourist destinations in French Polynesia, where there are several luxury resorts.

Transportation to this island is usually done from Tahiti by air transport in flights of about 5 minutes or through numerous ferries that move from the port of Papeʼete to Moʼorea. It is also possible to hire a private boat for transport.

=== Tourism ===
Moʼorea is visited by many Western tourists who travel to French Polynesia. Especially popular as a honeymoon destination, Moʼorea can often be seen in advertisements in American wedding magazines. Arthur Frommer declared in Frommer's travel guide that he considered it "the most beautiful island in the world".

The main source of income has been tourism since the 1960s. An American company constructed in 1961 the Bali Shark Hotel, the first luxury hotel of Moʼorea, on the north coast, near the town of Maharepa. Since then, tourism has continuously increased, so that at present, according to some guides of trips, Moʼorea has even more tourist hotels than Tahiti. The hotel complex is located mainly on the north and northwest coast. Most of the beaches on the northwest coast belong to hotels and are not open to the public. On the northeast coast, in Temaʼe, near the airfield, there is a public beach.

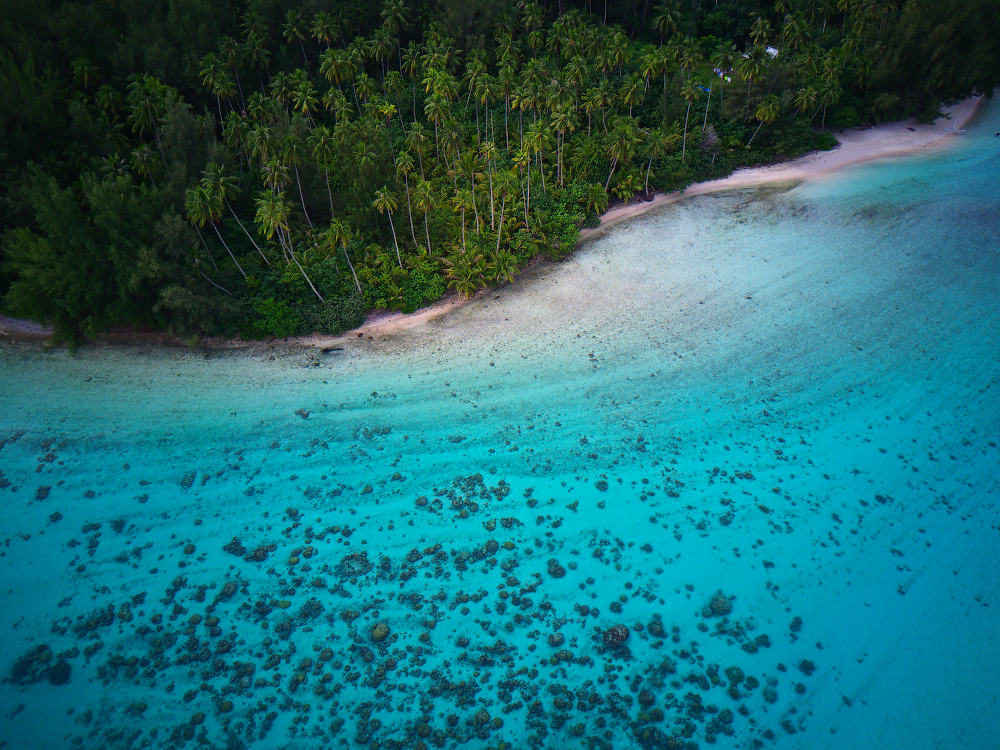
Moʼorea, view from the sky (Motu Fareona)

Moʼorea is sometimes visited by cruise ships.

On the west coast, a traditional Polynesian village, the Tiki Village, has been rebuilt for tourists. There are dance performances, demonstrations of Polynesian handicrafts, and souvenir stores.

The race called the Moʼorea Marathon, held annually in February, is promoted by the tourism industry as the most beautiful in the world. Another international sporting event is the Aitoman Triathlon, held in October each year.

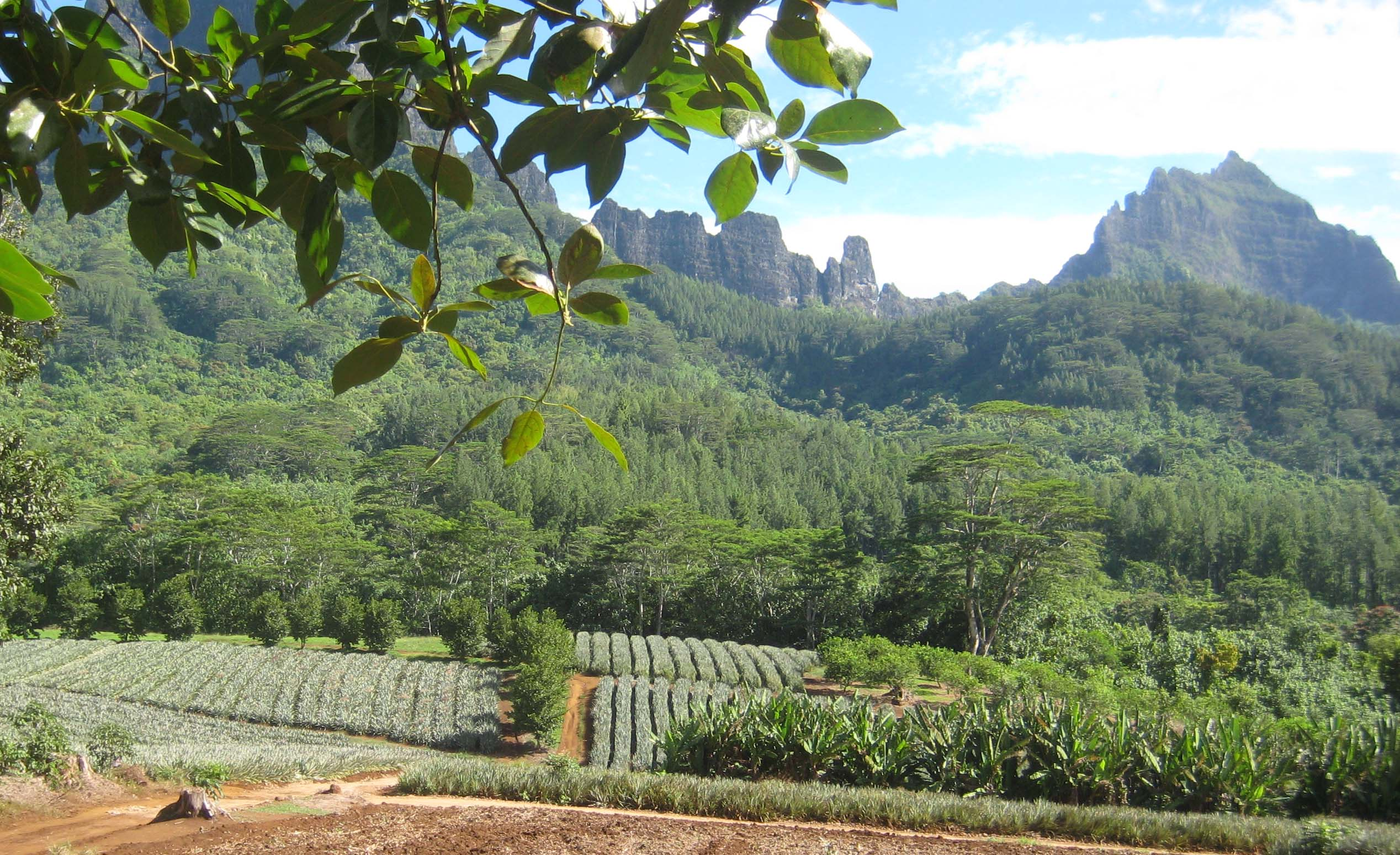
Pineapple farming in Moʼorea

=== Agriculture ===
Until the end of the 20th century, coffee was still grown on Moʼorea. Due to falling coffee prices, this is no longer profitable, and the cultivation of agricultural export crops has shifted to pineapple and Tahitian vanilla. Some small family farms continue to produce copra traditionally. Breadfruit, yams, taro, sweet potatoes, bananas, coconuts, and other tropical and subtropical fruits are grown for home consumption and hotel kitchens. Fishing continues to play an important, though declining, role in the island's economy.

== Research ==
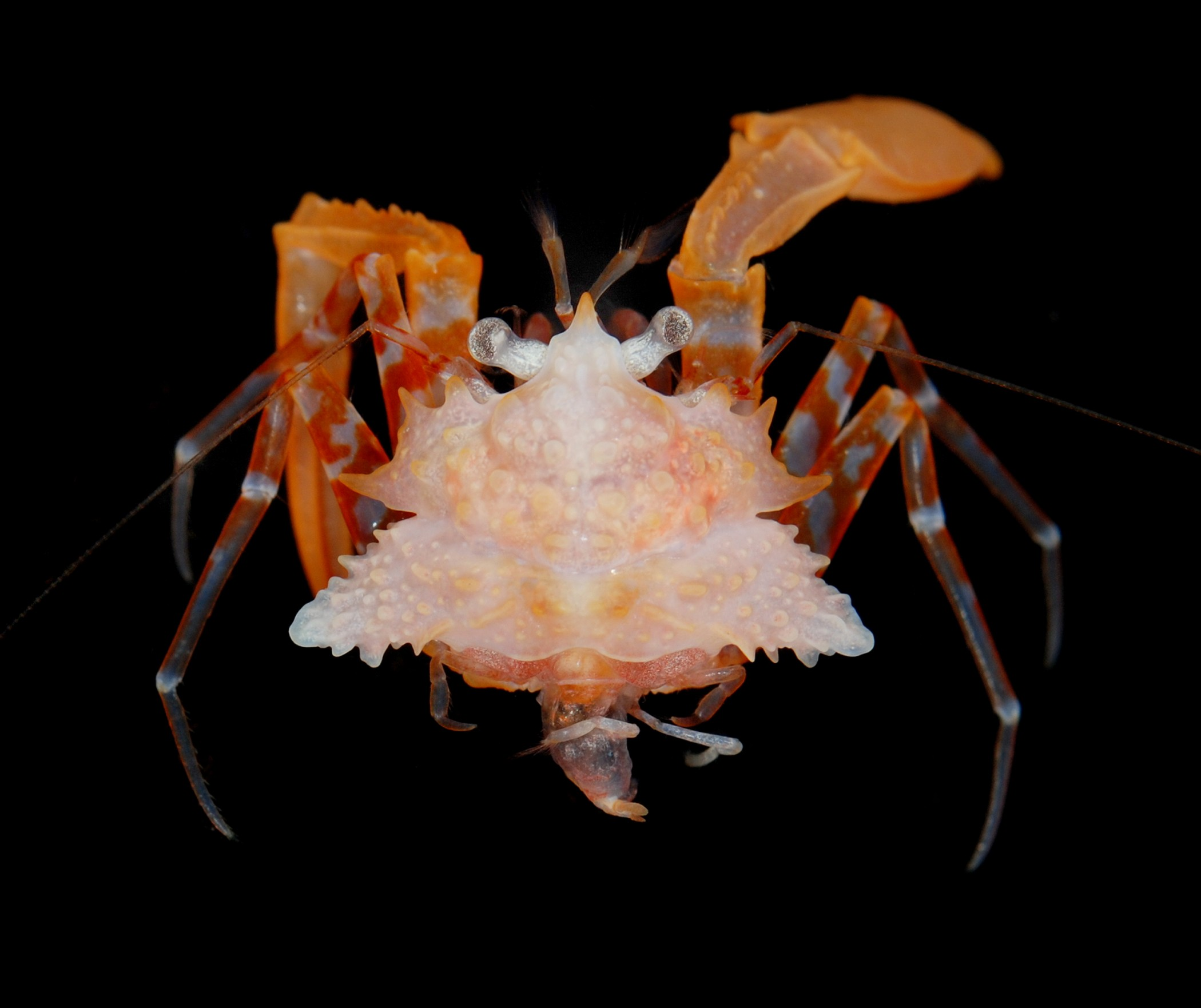
Patagurus rex, discovered as part of the Moorea Biocode Project

The University of California, Berkeley maintains the Richard B. Gump South Pacific Research Station on the west coast of Cook's Bay. The Gump station is also home to the Moʼorea Coral Reef Long Term Ecological Research Site (MCR LTER), part of a network established by the National Science Foundation in 1980 to support research on long-term ecological phenomena. The Moʼorea Coral Reef LTER became the 26th site in the network in September 2004.

Since 1981, the French École pratique des hautes études (EPHE) and the Centre national de la recherche scientifique (National Centre for Scientific Research; CNRS) have been maintaining a research station at the end of ʼ Ōpūnohu Bay. This Centre de Recherches Insulaires et Observatoire de l'Environnement (CRIOBE, Centre for island research and environment observatory) is a research site for several international projects, including the monitoring of coral reefs throughout French Polynesia as well as the monitoring of the fish population on the Tīahurā transect of Moʼorea's reef.

Research from the MCR LTER and CRIOBE led to the establishment of Mo'orea's Plan de Gestion de l'Espace Maritime (PGEM), to manage the marine resources of the island. The PGEM has been controversial among the fishing community.

The Moorea Biocode Project was an initiative to document and record the genetic sequences of every species native to the island. The project discovered endemic species such as Patagurus rex, a shell-less hermit crab dredged from the waters around Moʼorea.

== Religion ==
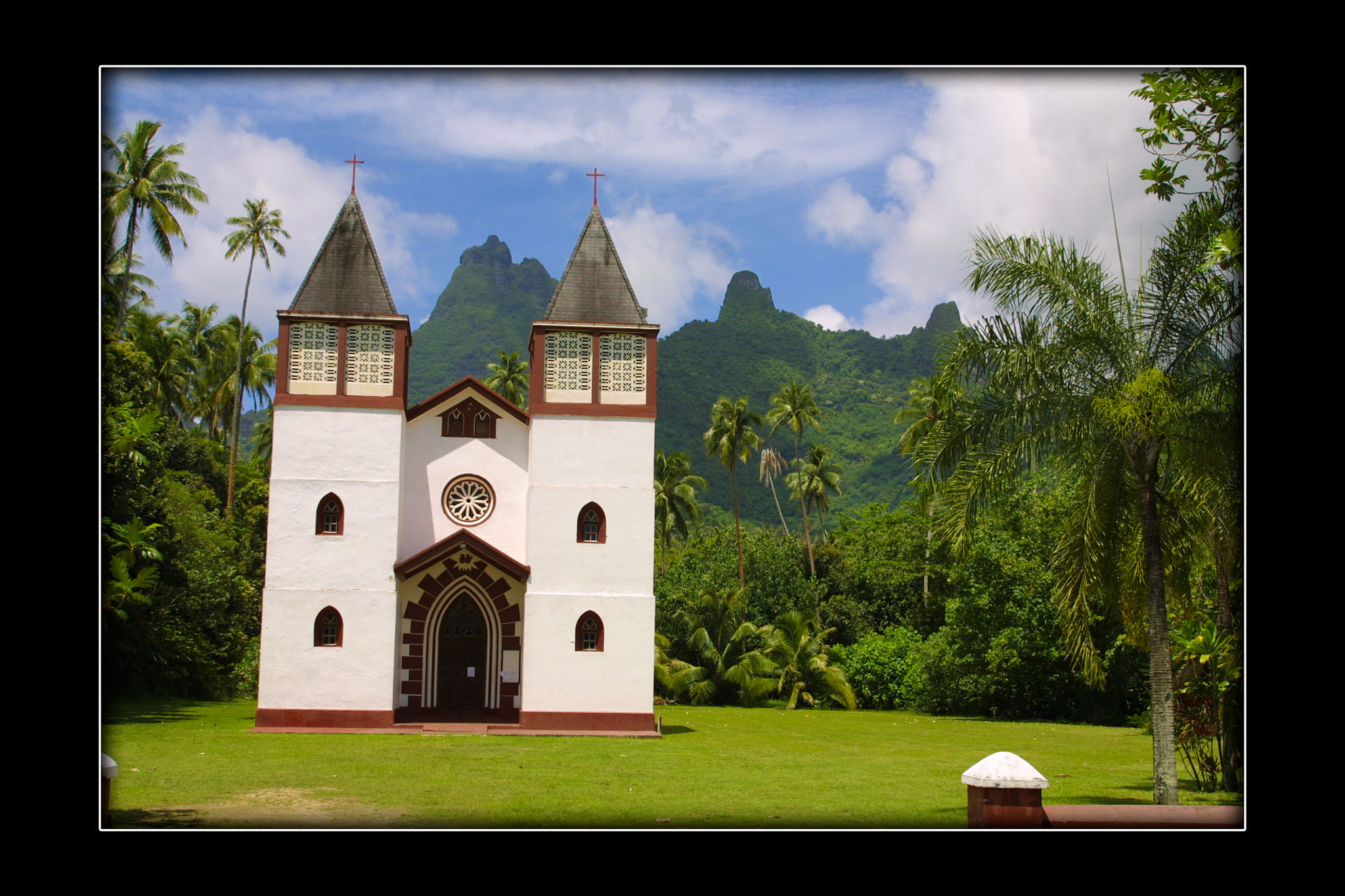
Church of the Holy Family in Haʼapiti (Église de la Sainte-Famille)

The majority of the local population are Christians, a consequence of European colonization and the activity of missionary groups from both the Roman Catholic Church and various Protestant groups. The Catholic Church controls four church buildings and a religious center on the island, all under the jurisdiction of the Metropolitan Archdiocese of Papeʼete with headquarters on the island of Tahiti:

St. Joseph Church in Paopao (Église Saint Joseph), Holy Family Church in Haʼapiti (Église de la Sainte-Famille), St. Michael Church in Papetōʼai (Église de Saint-Michel) St. Patrick Church in Afareaitu (Église de Saint-Patrice) and St. Francis Xavier Religious Center in Varari (Centre religieux Saint-François-Xavier).

Near Afareaitu is Moʼorea's oldest worship platform, the Marae Umarea, built around 900 CE, with its enclosure of large coral slabs directly over the lagoon.

== Transportation ==
Several ferries go to the Vaiʼare wharf in Moʼorea daily from Papeʼete, the Tahitian capital. Moʼorea's Temaʼe Airport has connections to the international airport in Papeʼete and onward to other Society Islands such as Tahiti. There is one road that goes around the island.

== See also ==
- List of volcanoes in French Polynesia
- Society Islands
- Windward Islands (Society Islands)
