= List of members of the Assembly of French Polynesia (2023–2028) =

Members of the Assembly of French Polynesia were elected on 16 and 30 April 2023. According to second-round results, the 57 representatives consisted of 38 representatives of Tāvini Huiraʻatira, 16 for the Tāpura-ʻĀmuitahiraʻa joint list, and 3 for A here ia Porinetia.

== Members ==
Name	Section	Party
Tematai Le Gayic	Windward Isles 1	Tāvini Huiraʻatira
Minarii Galenon	Windward Isles 1	Tāvini Huiraʻatira
Mitema Tapati	Windward Isles 1	Tāvini Huiraʻatira
Teremuura Kohumoetini-Rurua	Windward Isles 1	Tāvini Huiraʻatira
Tevaipaea Hoiore	Windward Isles 1	Tāvini Huiraʻatira
Thilda Garbutt-Harehoe	Windward Isles 1	Tāvini Huiraʻatira
Heinui Le Caill	Windward Isles 1	Tāvini Huiraʻatira
Vahinetua Tuahu	Windward Isles 1	Tāvini Huiraʻatira
Teura Iriti	Windward Isles 1	Tāpura Huiraʻatira
Edouard Fritch	Windward Isles 1	Tāpura Huiraʻatira
Pascale Haiti	Windward Isles 1	Tāpura Huiraʻatira
Michel Buillard	Windward Isles 1	Tāpura Huiraʻatira
Teave Chaumette	Windward Isles 1	A here ia Porinetia
Antony Géros	Windward Isles 2	Tāvini Huiraʻatira
Béatrice Le Gayic	Windward Isles 2	Tāvini Huiraʻatira
Steve Chailloux	Windward Isles 2	Tāvini Huiraʻatira
Hinamoeura Morgant-Cross	Windward Isles 2	Tāvini Huiraʻatira
Ueva Hamblin	Windward Isles 2	Tāvini Huiraʻatira
Frangelica Bourgeois-Tarahu	Windward Isles 2	Tāvini Huiraʻatira
Vincent Maono	Windward Isles 2	Tāvini Huiraʻatira
Patricia Pahio Jennings	Windward Isles 2	Tāvini Huiraʻatira
Allen Salmon	Windward Isles 2	Tāvini Huiraʻatira
Tepuaraurii Teriitahi	Windward Isles 2	Tāpura Huiraʻatira
Henri Flohr	Windward Isles 2	Tāpura Huiraʻatira
Sonia Taae	Windward Isles 2	Tāpura Huiraʻatira
Nicole Sanquer	Windward Isles 2	A here ia Porinetia
Oscar Temaru	Windward Isles 3	Tāvini Huiraʻatira
Maurea Maamaatuaiahutapu	Windward Isles 3	Tāvini Huiraʻatira
Vetea I te Rai Araipu	Windward Isles 3	Tāvini Huiraʻatira
Elise Vanaa	Windward Isles 3	Tāvini Huiraʻatira
Edwin Shiro-Abe	Windward Isles 3	Tāvini Huiraʻatira
Jeanne Vaianui	Windward Isles 3	Tāvini Huiraʻatira
Mike Cowan	Windward Isles 3	Tāvini Huiraʻatira
Pauline Niva	Windward Isles 3	Tāvini Huiraʻatira
Simplicio Lissant	Windward Isles 3	Tāpura Huiraʻatira
Cathy Puchon	Windward Isles 3	Tāpura Huiraʻatira
Nuihau Laurey	Windward Isles 3	A here ia Porinetia
Moetai Brotherson	Leeward Isles	Tāvini Huiraʻatira
Sylvana Tiatoa	Leeward Isles	Tāvini Huiraʻatira
Tevahiarii Teraiarue	Leeward Isles	Tāvini Huiraʻatira
Rachelle Florès	Leeward Isles	Tāvini Huiraʻatira
Pierre Terou	Leeward Isles	Tāvini Huiraʻatira
Teumere Atger-Hoi	Leeward Isles	Tāvini Huiraʻatira
Gaston Tong Sang	Leeward Isles	Tāpura Huiraʻatira
Lana Tetuanui	Leeward Isles	Tāpura Huiraʻatira
Odette Homai	West Tuamotu	Tāvini Huiraʻatira
Félix Tetua	West Tuamotu	Tāvini Huiraʻatira
Tahuhu Maraeura	West Tuamotu	Tāpura Huiraʻatira
Tahia Brown	East Tuamotu and Gambiers	Tāvini Huiraʻatira
Ernest Teagai	East Tuamotu and Gambiers	Tāvini Huiraʻatira
Yseult Butcher	East Tuamotu and Gambiers	Tāpura Huiraʻatira
Bruno Florès	Austral Islands	Tāvini Huiraʻatira
Maite Hauata	Austral Islands	Tāvini Huiraʻatira
Frédéric Riveta	Austral Islands	Tāpura Huiraʻatira
Marielle Kohumoetini	Marquesas Islands	Tāvini Huiraʻatira
Benoît Kautai	Marquesas Islands	Tāpura Huiraʻatira
Joëlle Frébault	Marquesas Islands	Tāpura Huiraʻatira

== Changes ==
- Vetea I te Rai Araipu resigned from the Assembly on 1 June 2023. He was replaced by Ruben Teremate.
