= Hinamoeura Morgant-Cross =

French Polynesian politician

Member of the French Polynesian Assembly for Windward Isles 2
- Incumbent
- Assumed office 11 May 2023

Personal details
- Born: 1988
- Party: Tāvini Huiraʻatira

Hinamoeura Morgant-Cross (born 1988) is a French Polynesian anti-nuclear activist and politician. She is the daughter of politician Valentina Cross and a member of Tāvini Huiraʻatira. As an MP she proposed a resolution that the Assembly of French Polynesia support the Treaty on the Prohibition of Nuclear Weapons. In November 2023 she was awarded the Nuclear-Free Future Award.

== Early life and education ==
She is the daughter of politician Valentina Cross and a member of Tāvini Huiraʻatira. Morgant-Cross is from Teva I Uta. She was seven years old in 1996 when the last bomb in a series of thirty years of nuclear detonations on French Polynesia was made. Morgant-Cross has suffered from leukemia from the age of 25, and several of her family members also have cancer, which she believes is a result of France's nuclear detonations in the Pacific.

== Political career ==
Morgant-Cross is a member of Association 193 and Mururoa e Tatou, and has represented French Polynesia at meetings of the International Campaign to Abolish Nuclear Weapons. In 2019 she spoke at the United Nations about how French President Charles de Gaulle presented the nuclear detonations programme to people in Tahiti as "a major development" of which they should be proud. She was first elected to the Assembly of French Polynesia in the 2023 French Polynesian legislative election. As an MP she proposed a resolution that the Assembly support the Treaty on the Prohibition of Nuclear Weapons, and supported term-limits for Assembly members.

In November 2023 she was awarded the Nuclear-Free Future Award.
