= Mount Duff =

Mountain in French Polynesia

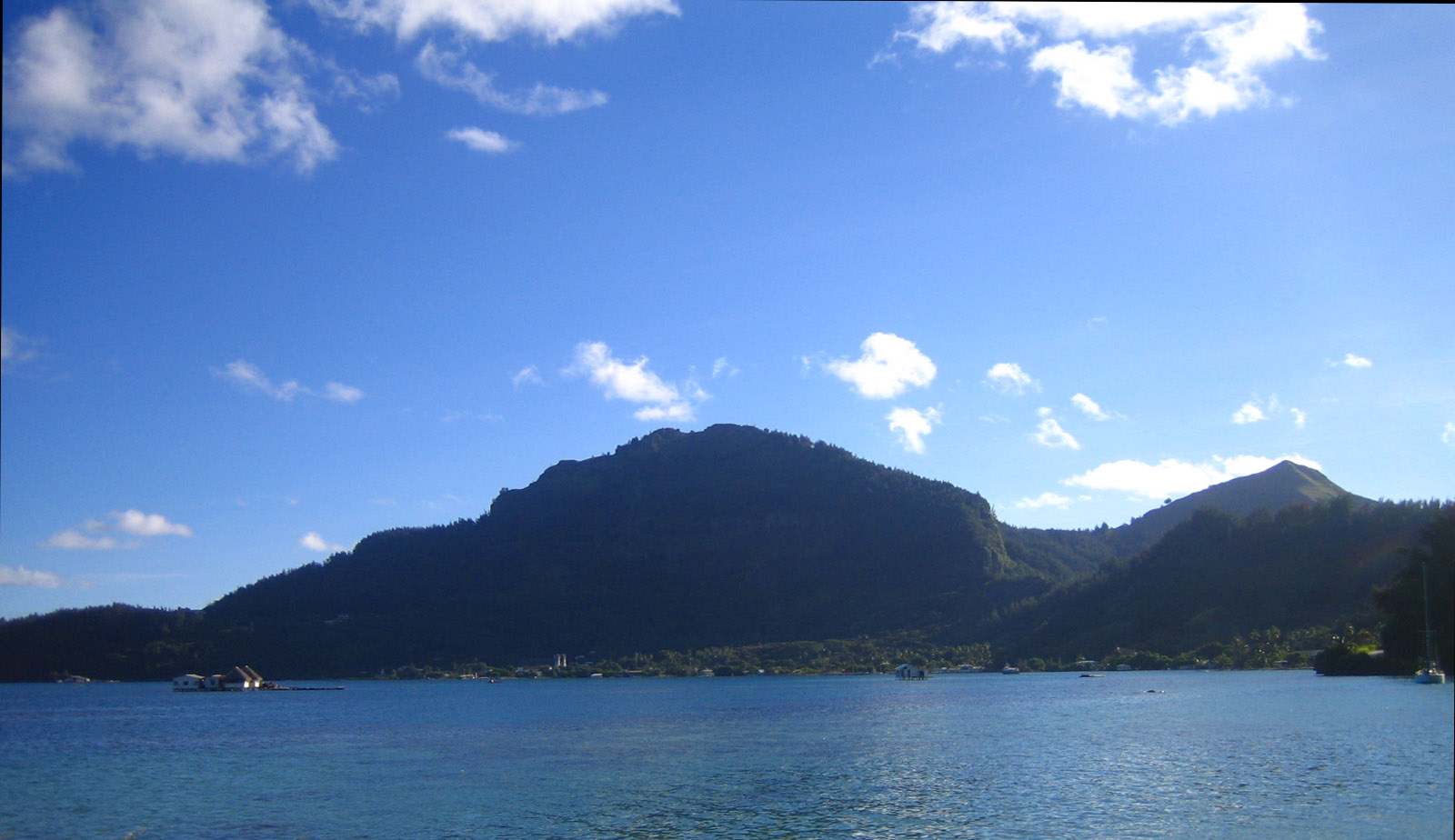
- View of Mount Duff, with part of the village Rikitea at its foot, and Mount Mokoto in the background on the right.

Highest point
- Elevation: 441 m (1,447 ft)
- Prominence: 441 m (1,447 ft)
- Coordinates: 23°07′43″S 134°58′25″W

Geography
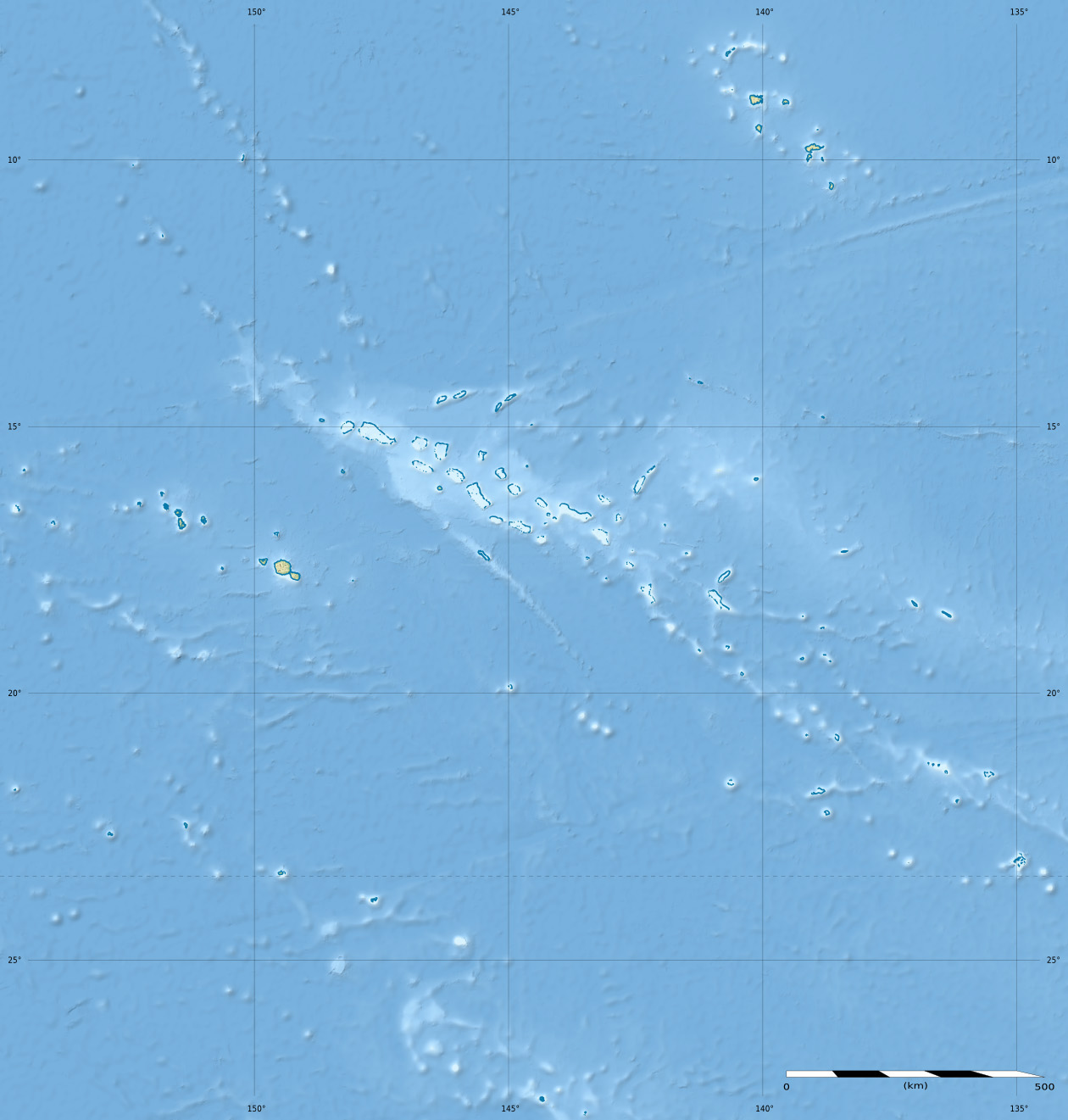
- Location within French Polynesia
- Location: Mangareva, Gambier Islands, French Polynesia

Mount Duff, also called Auorotini in the Mangarevan language, is the highest peak on the island of Mangareva in the Gambier Islands, French Polynesia. It has an elevation of 441 m. The peak was named by James Wilson after the ship Duff, which carried missionaries of the London Missionary Society to Tahiti.

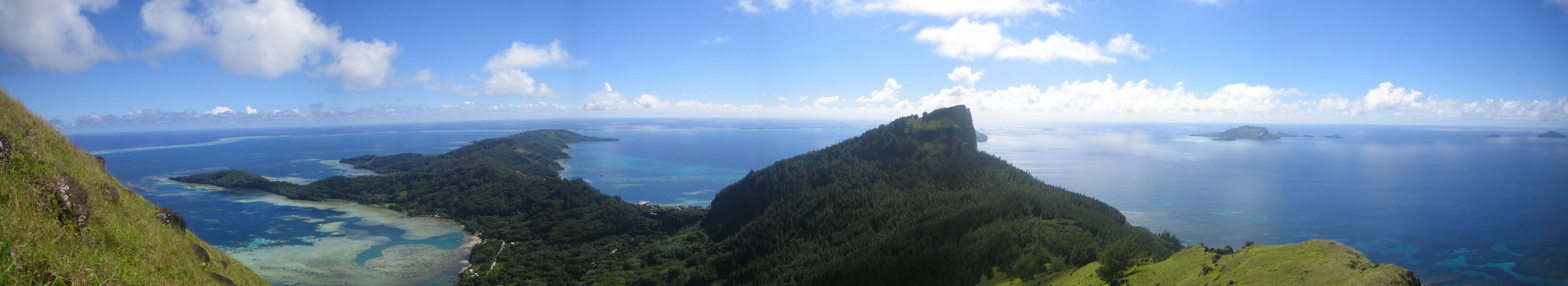
View of Mount Duff from Mont Mokoto.
