= 1999–2000 Southern Hemisphere tropical cyclone season =

The 1999–2000 Southern Hemisphere tropical cyclone season was made up of three different basins and respective seasons; the

- 1999–2000 South-West Indian Ocean cyclone season west of 90°E,
- 1999–2000 Australian region cyclone season between 90°E and 160°E, and
- 1999–2000 South Pacific cyclone season east of 160°E.
