= Association 193 =

French Polynesian non-governmental organisation

Association 193 is an anti-nuclear non-governmental organisation in French Polynesia. The association is named for the 193 nuclear weapons tests conducted by France at Moruroa and Fangataufa between 1966 and 1996. It was established in 2014 to preserve the historical memory of nuclear testing and campaign for the French government to tell the truth about its impacts and compensate victims.

The association initially called for 2 July—the date of the first French nuclear test in Polynesia—to be made a formal date of commemoration. In January 2016 it launched its first major campaign, a petition for a referendum on the nuclear issue and on compensation. By February 2016 the petition had more than 30,000 signatures. It also worked with Mururoa e Tatou to organise a series of demonstrations around the visit of French President François Hollande. In July 2016 it organised an exhibition and public demonstration to mark the 50th anniversary of the first nuclear test. In October 2016 it successfully opposed plans for potentially contaminated gravel from Hao atoll to be used in road construction on Rikitea. In January 2017 it created a unit to assist test victims to claim compensation from the French government.

In August 2017 the association celebrated its third anniversary and announced its support for a campaign by the Maohi Protestant Church to pursue France for crimes against humanity in the International Criminal Court.

In March 2020 the association denounced changes to France's nuclear compensation law which would make it more difficult for victims to obtain compensation. It also denounced an attempt to further limit compensation via a clause slipped in to COVID-19 legislation.
