= 1999–2000 South Pacific cyclone season =

Tropical cyclone season

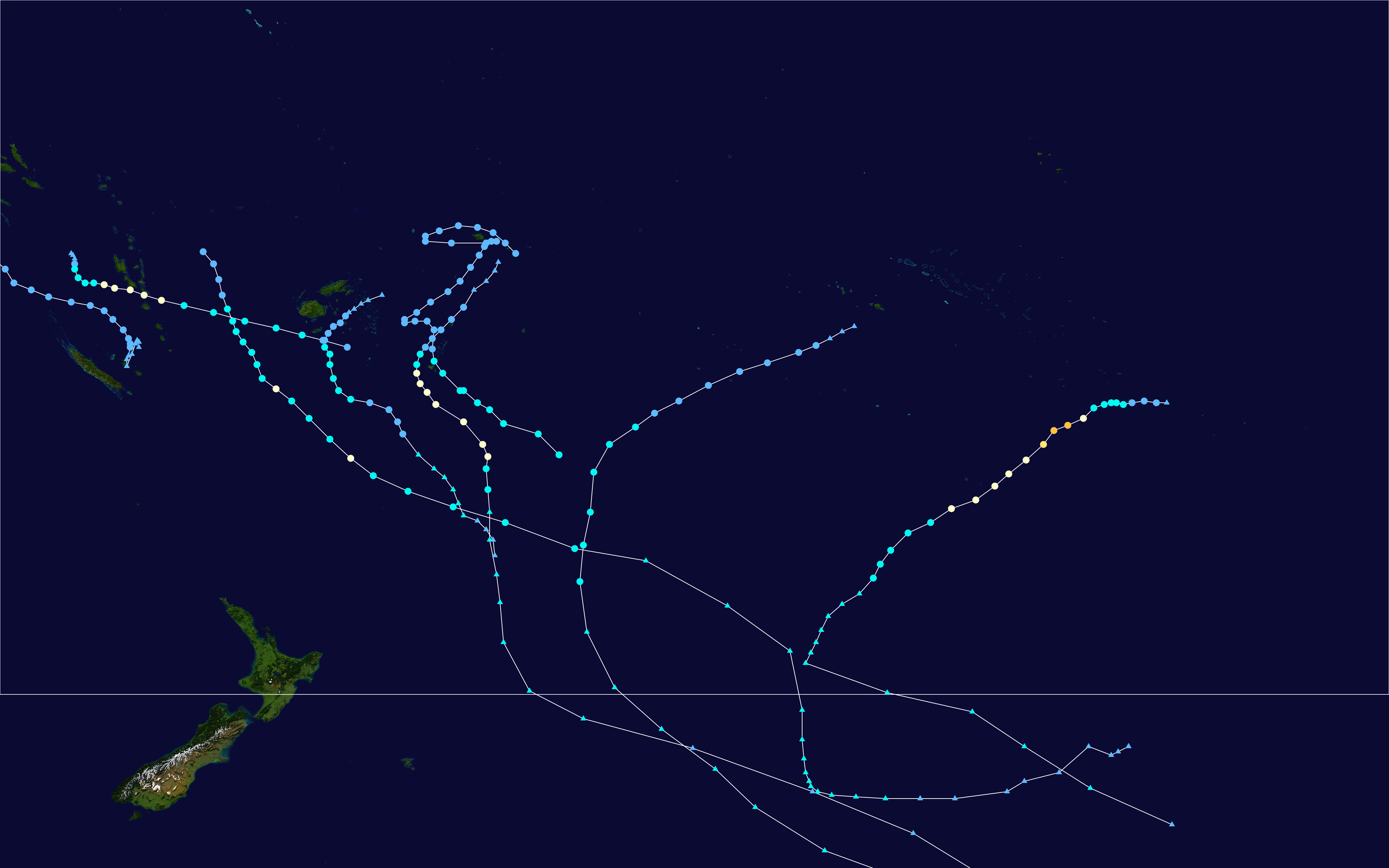
- Season summary map

Seasonal boundaries
- First system formed: September 5, 1999
- Last system dissipated: May 21, 2000

Strongest storm
- Name: Kim
  - Maximum winds: 165 km/h (105 mph) (10-minute sustained)
  - Lowest pressure: 935 hPa (mbar)

Seasonal statistics
- Total disturbances: 25
- Total depressions: 20
- Tropical cyclones: 6
- Severe tropical cyclones: 4
- Total fatalities: At least 1 indirect
- Total damage: Unknown

Related articles
- 1999–2000 Australian region cyclone season; 1999–2000 South-West Indian Ocean cyclone season

The 1999–2000 South Pacific tropical cyclone season was an event in the annual cycle of tropical cyclone formation and ran from November 1, 1999, to April 30, 2000, in the South Pacific.

The regional tropical cyclone operational plan defines a "tropical cyclone year" separately from a "tropical cyclone season", with the "tropical cyclone year" for this season lasting from July 1, 1999, to June 30, 2000.

All of the six named storms affected land in some way, but no major damage was reported from any of the storms.

== Systems ==
=== Tropical Depression 06F ===
- Tropical depression (Australian scale)
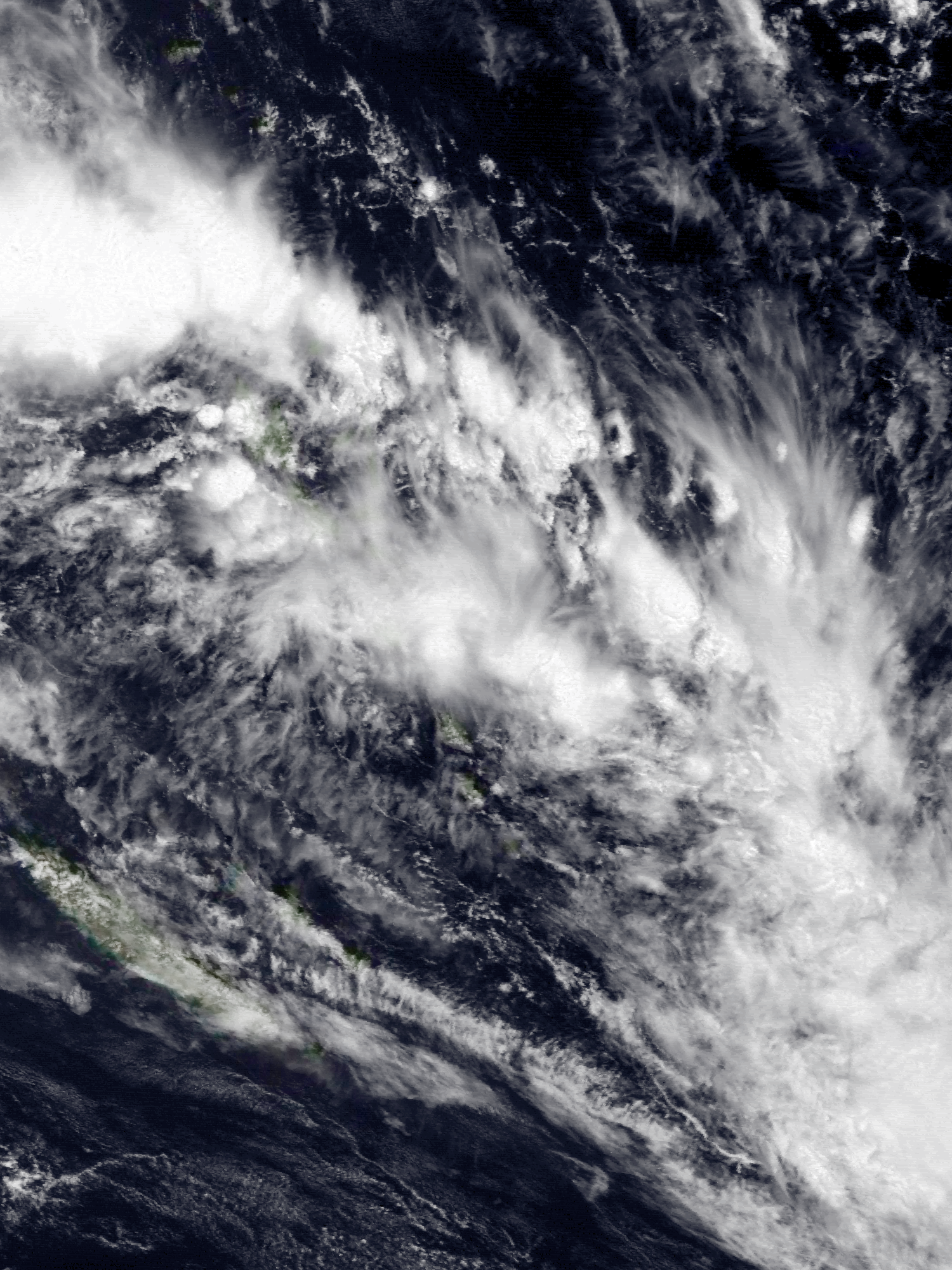
- Duration: January 3 – January 6
- Peak intensity: 45 km/h (30 mph) (10-min); 1004 hPa (mbar)

=== Severe Tropical Cyclone Iris ===
- Category 3 severe tropical cyclone (Australian scale)
- Category 1 tropical cyclone (SSHWS)
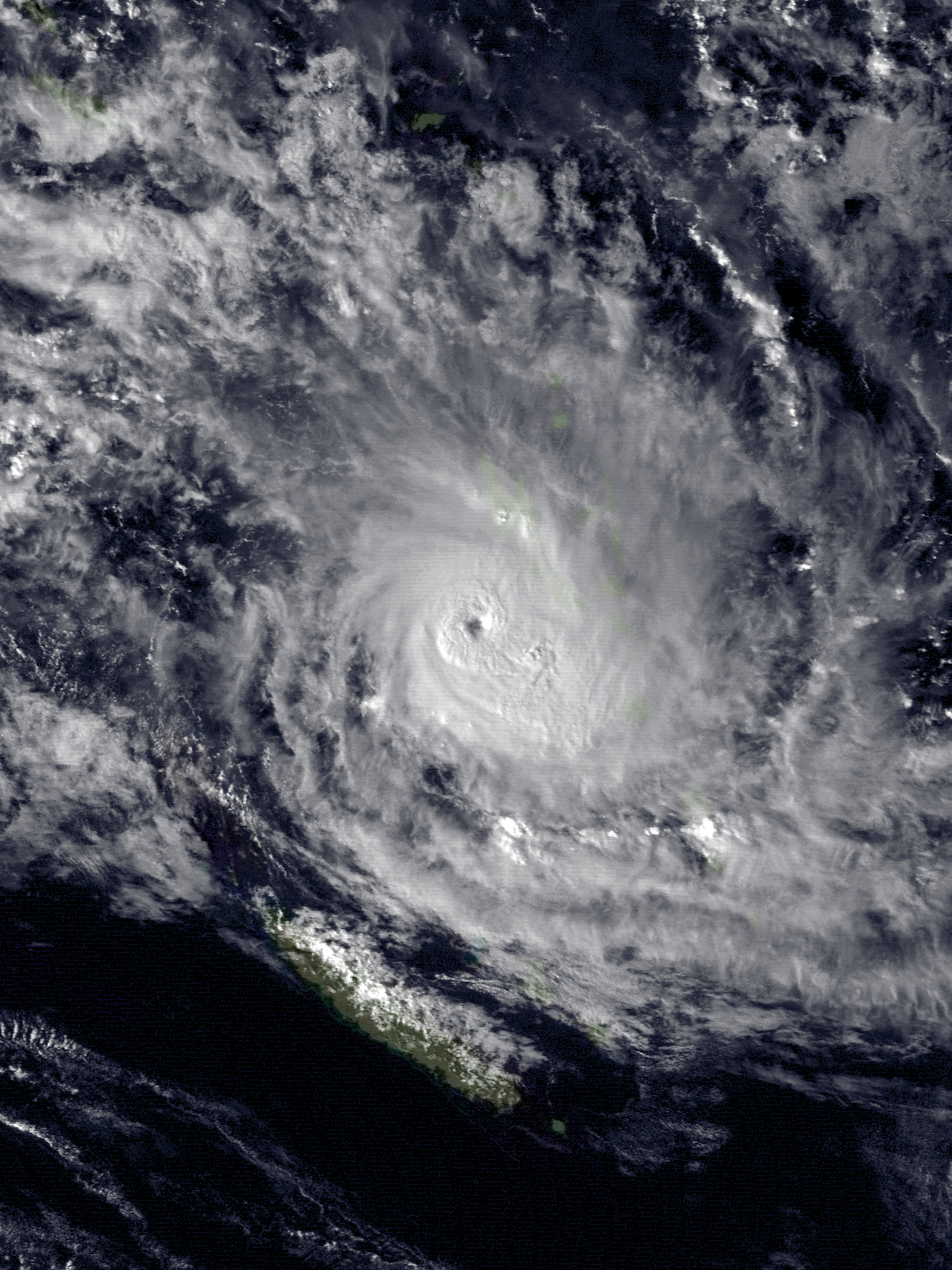
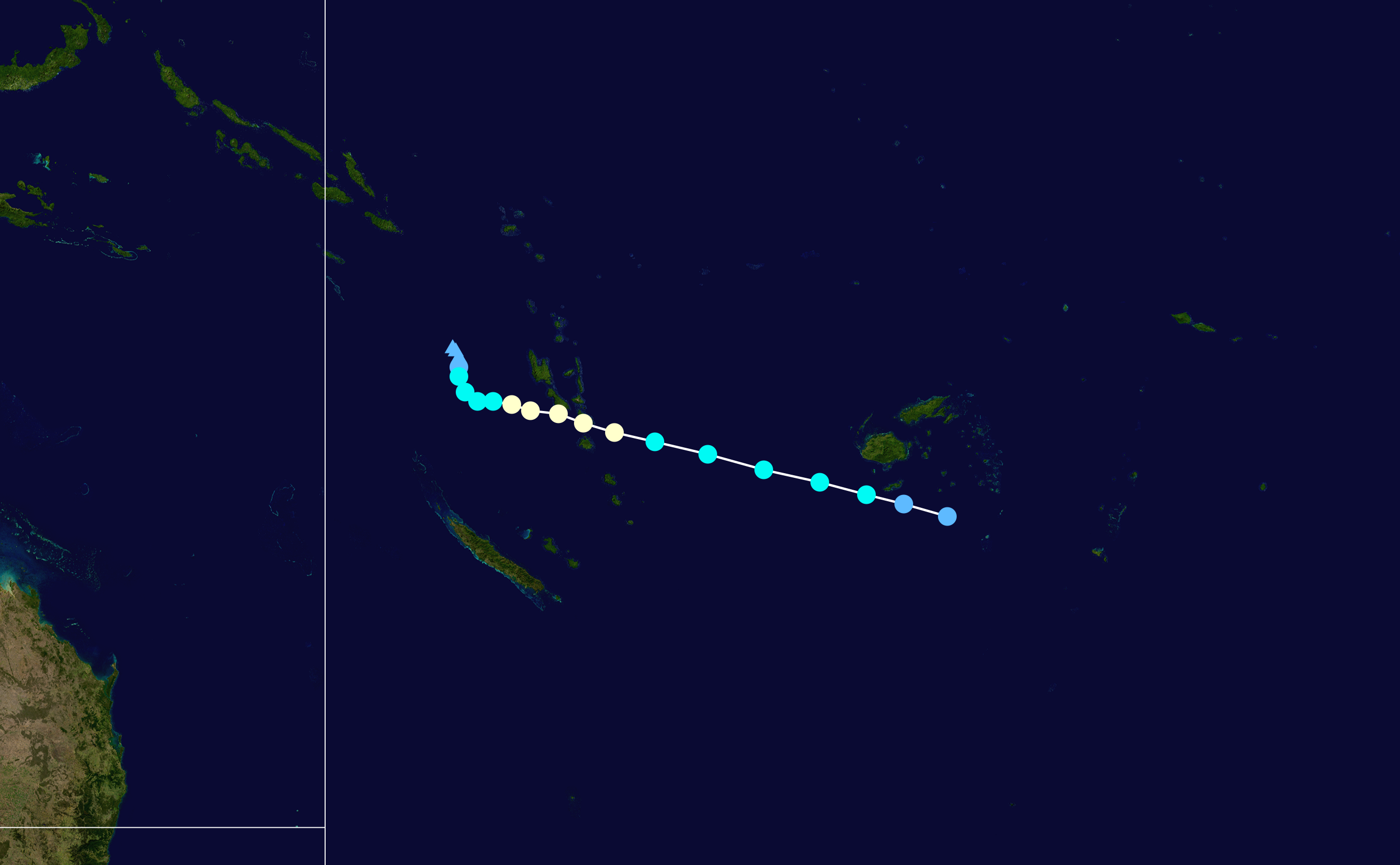
- Duration: January 6 – January 10
- Peak intensity: 150 km/h (90 mph) (10-min); 964 hPa (mbar)

A disturbance was identified on January 3 at 06:00 (UTC) near Espiritu Santo in Vanuatu. The storm was difficult to locate the general centre for the next couple of days, but on January 6, it became more organised, while displaying midget characteristics. On January 7 at 21:00 (UTC), it was named Tropical Cyclone Iris, located 330 km (210 mi) northwest of Port Vila, moving southeast. In Vila, 110 km (68 mi) away from Iris's centre, recorded winds of only up to 20 knots (37 km/h), explaining the very small size of the cyclone. Iris intensified with 10-min winds increasing to 60 knots (110 km/h) on January 8 at 12:00 (UTC). JTWC's estimated 1-min winds was 65 knots (120 km/h). There were some indications that Iris could be far more intense than what the warning centres estimated, mainly due to its small size. Iris accelerated eastward, leaving Vanuatu. On January 9, Iris began its weakening trend, while moving closer to Fiji. Iris was downgraded to a depression on January 10, just 48 hours after it had reached its peak intensity. The final warning placed the centre on the Dateline 150 nmi (280 km) southeast of Fiji.

Fresh to strong winds and very rough seas were experienced over the western and southern parts of Fiji. Overall damage was minimal. Cyclone Iris was most notable for its rapid strengthening in its early stages, followed by its rapid decay.

=== Tropical Disturbance 07F ===
- Tropical disturbance (Australian scale)
- Duration: January 16 – January 16
- Peak intensity: Winds not specified;

=== Tropical Depression 08F ===
- Tropical depression (Australian scale)
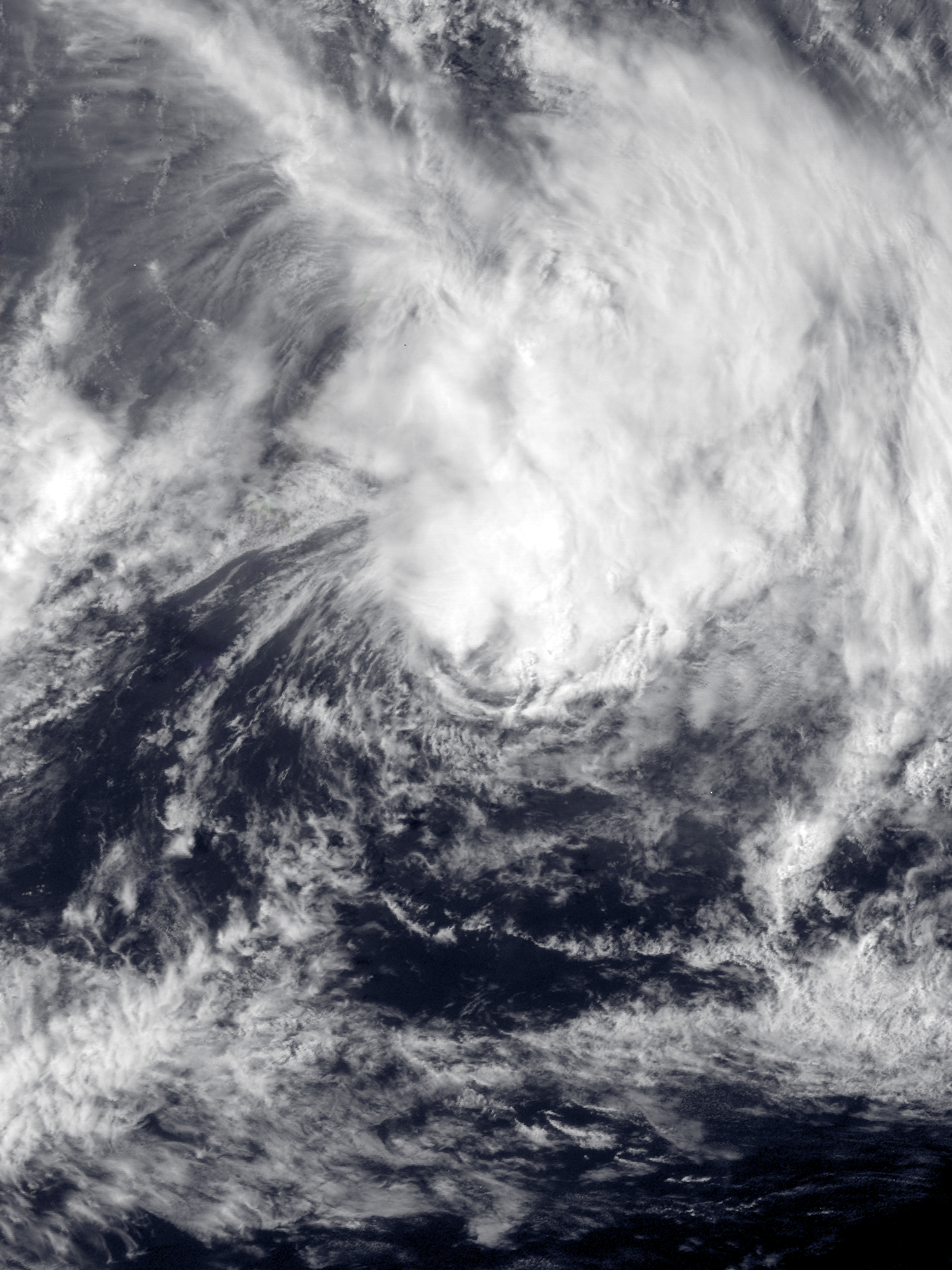
- Duration: January 20 – January 26
- Peak intensity: 75 km/h (45 mph) (10-min); 996 hPa (mbar)

=== Severe Tropical Cyclone Jo ===
- Category 3 severe tropical cyclone (Australian scale)
- Category 1 tropical cyclone (SSHWS)
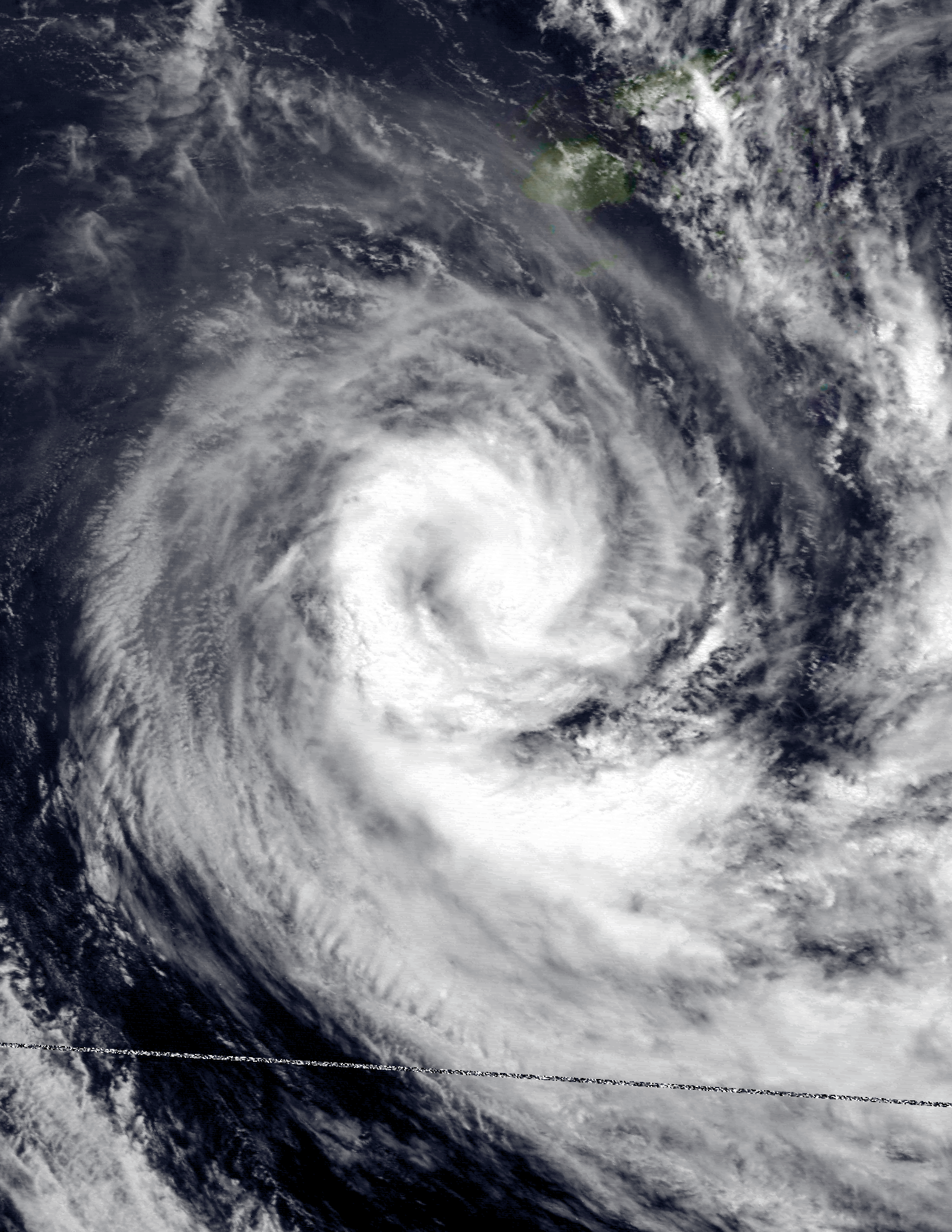
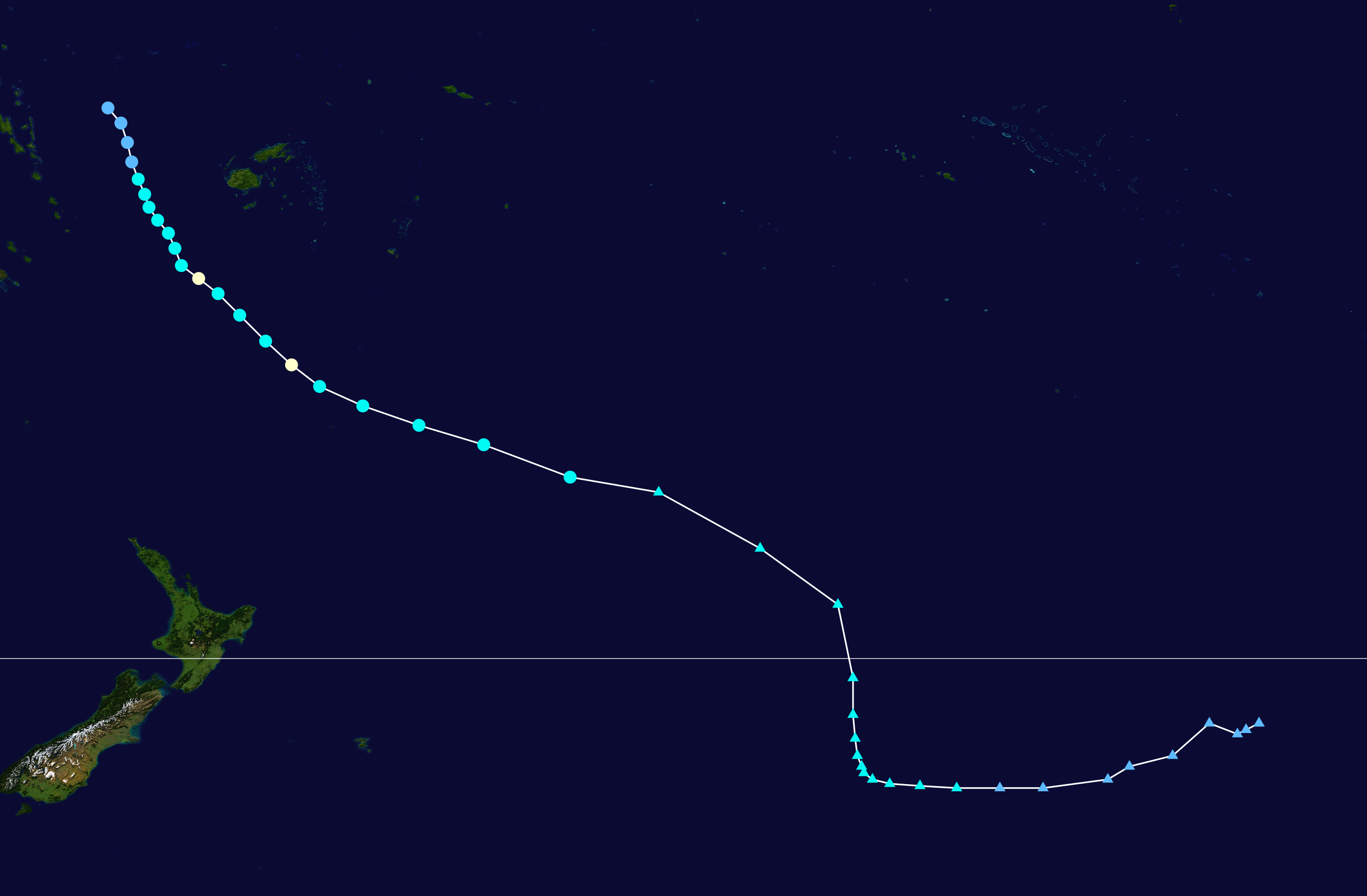
- Duration: January 23 – January 27
- Peak intensity: 120 km/h (75 mph) (10-min); 972 hPa (mbar)

A disturbance was first identified over northern parts of Vanuatu on January 19. It developed slowly, but deepened quickly on January 22, and advisories were issued on the system on January 23. It moved southward and was upgraded to Tropical Cyclone Jo on January 24 at 03:00 (UTC). Jo moved to the south-east and attained storm force winds 15 hours after being named. The cyclone reached its peak intensity on January 26 at 00:00 (UTC) located 650 km (400 mi) south of Nadi, with 10-min average winds of 60 knots (110 km/h). JTWC's peak 1-min average winds were 65 knots (120 km/h). Jo moved further to the south-east, and moved close enough to affect Fiji. Gusts to 50 knots (93 km/h) were recorded on Viti Levu on Fiji, even though Jo was about 445 km (277 mi) away from the Fiji. Flash flooding was reported, but there was no major river flooding. Cyclone Jo was declared extratropical on January 28 at 06:00 (UTC) when located more than 1,000 nmi (1,900 km) east of North Island in New Zealand.

=== Severe Tropical Cyclone Kim ===
- Category 4 severe tropical cyclone (Australian scale)
- Category 3 tropical cyclone (SSHWS)
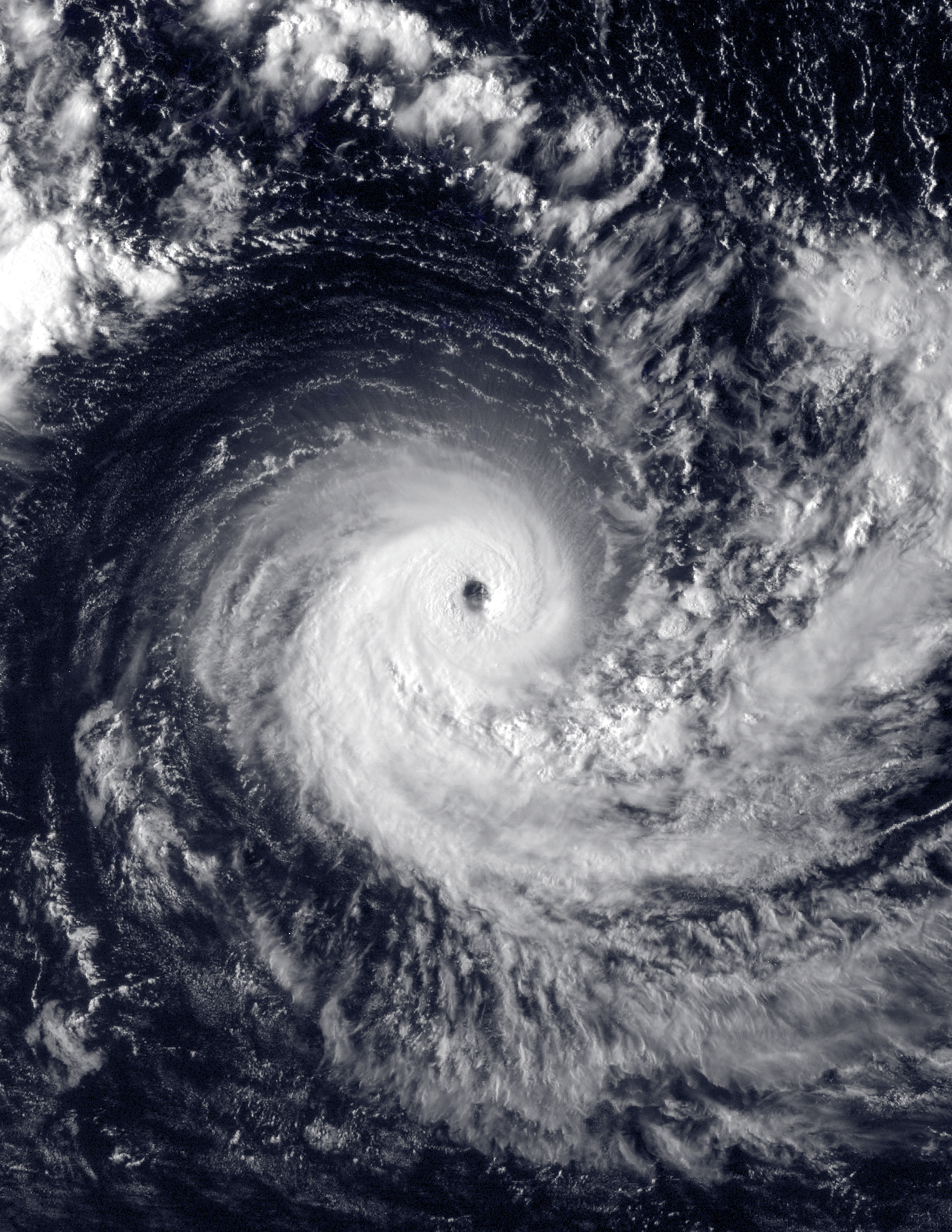
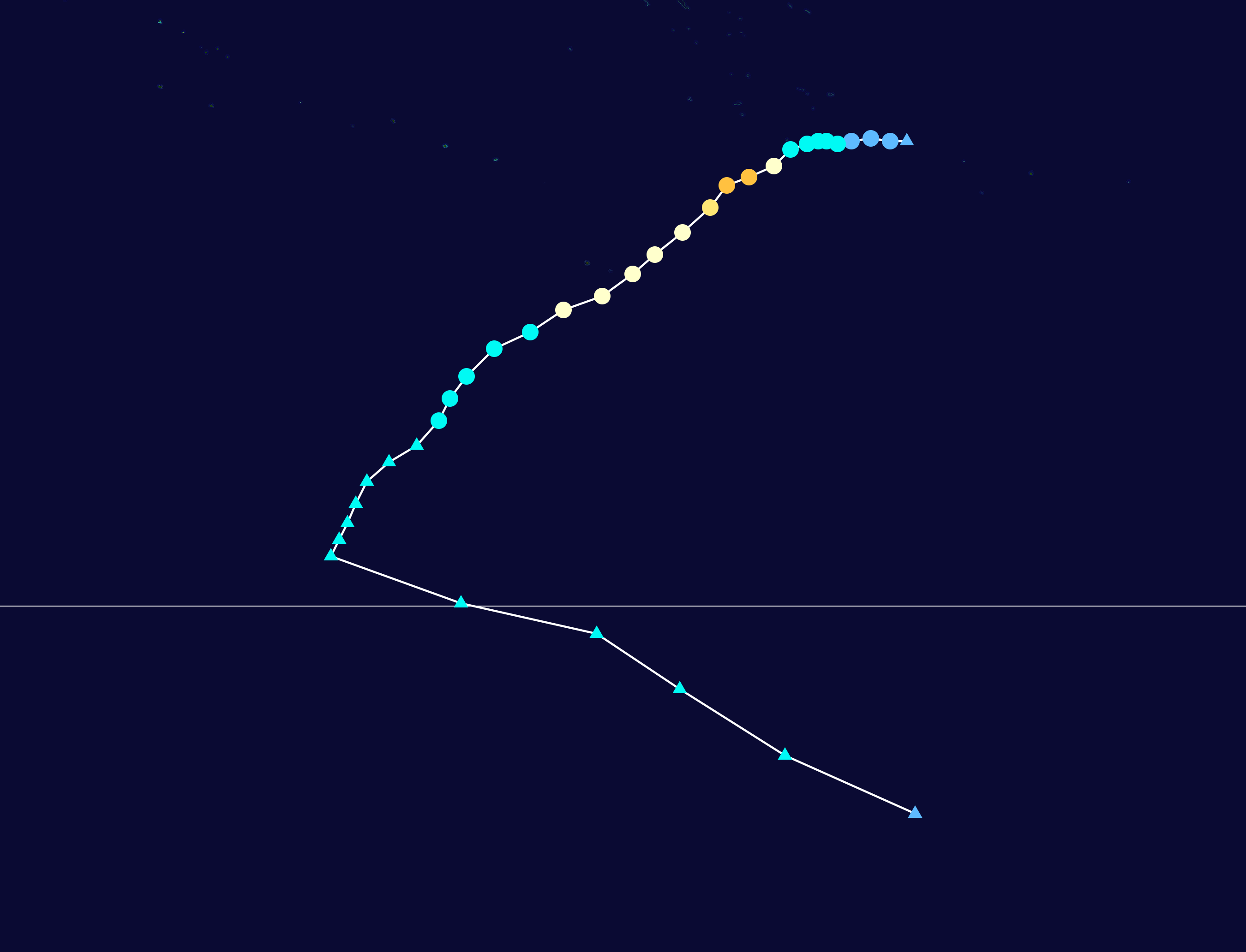
- Duration: February 22 – February 29
- Peak intensity: 165 km/h (105 mph) (10-min); 935 hPa (mbar)

During February 22, a cold core low developed into a tropical depression, about 110 km (70 mi) to the east-southeast of Rikitea in French Polynesia. It initially developed little but late on February 24, the depression developed rapidly, and the storm reached tropical storm strength at 18:00 (UTC), named Tropical Cyclone Kim. It was located about 75 km (47 mi) west of Rikitea or about 125 km (78 mi) southeast of Mururoa. Cyclone Kim reached hurricane strength on February 25, only 18 hours after being named, while moving to the south-west. The storm reached its peak intensity of 80 knots (150 km/h) on February 26 at 12:00 (UTC), located more than 1,295 km (805 mi) east of Tahiti. Minimum pressure at this time was 955 mbar. The estimated 1-min average winds from NPMOC was 100 knots (190 km/h). Kim gradually weakened over cooler waters, still moving to the south-west. Cyclone Kim became extratropical south of Tahiti on February 29 at 06:00 (UTC).

Damage from Kim was minimal from Rikitea, since it was only a depression at the time. The island recorded 10-min average winds of 27 knots (50 km/h), with a peak gust of 52 knots (96 km/h) and a minimum pressure of 996 mbar. As a hurricane, the island of Rapa Iti recorded a gust of 74 knots (137 km/h), when Kim was 150 km (93 mi) away from the island. A pressure of 995.8 mbar was recorded. Overall, damage in French Polynesia was minor.

=== Tropical Depression 13F ===
- Tropical depression (Australian scale)
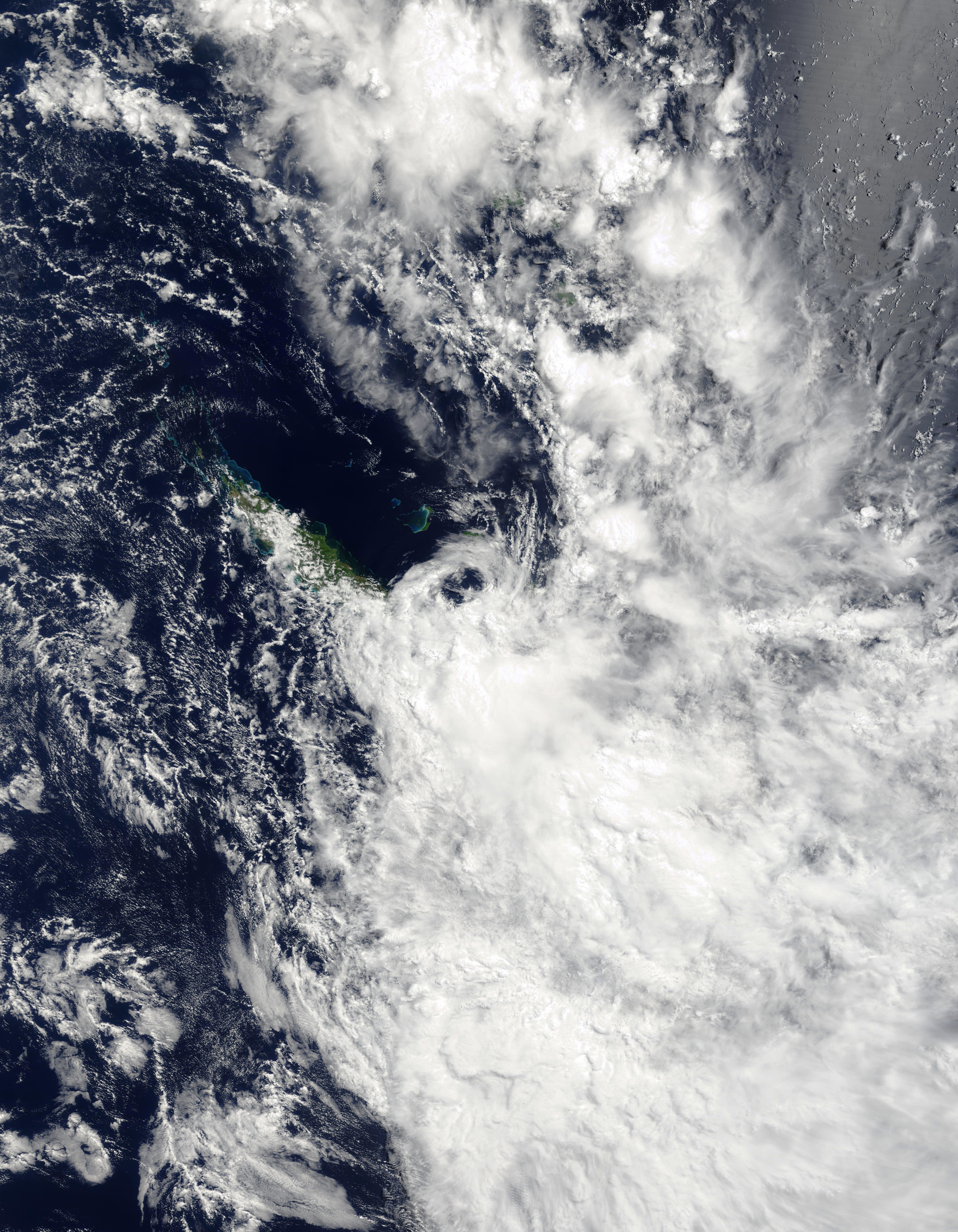
- Duration: February 28 – February 29
- Peak intensity: 65 km/h (40 mph) (10-min); 994 hPa (mbar)

=== Tropical Cyclone Leo ===
- Category 2 tropical cyclone (Australian scale)
- Tropical storm (SSHWS)
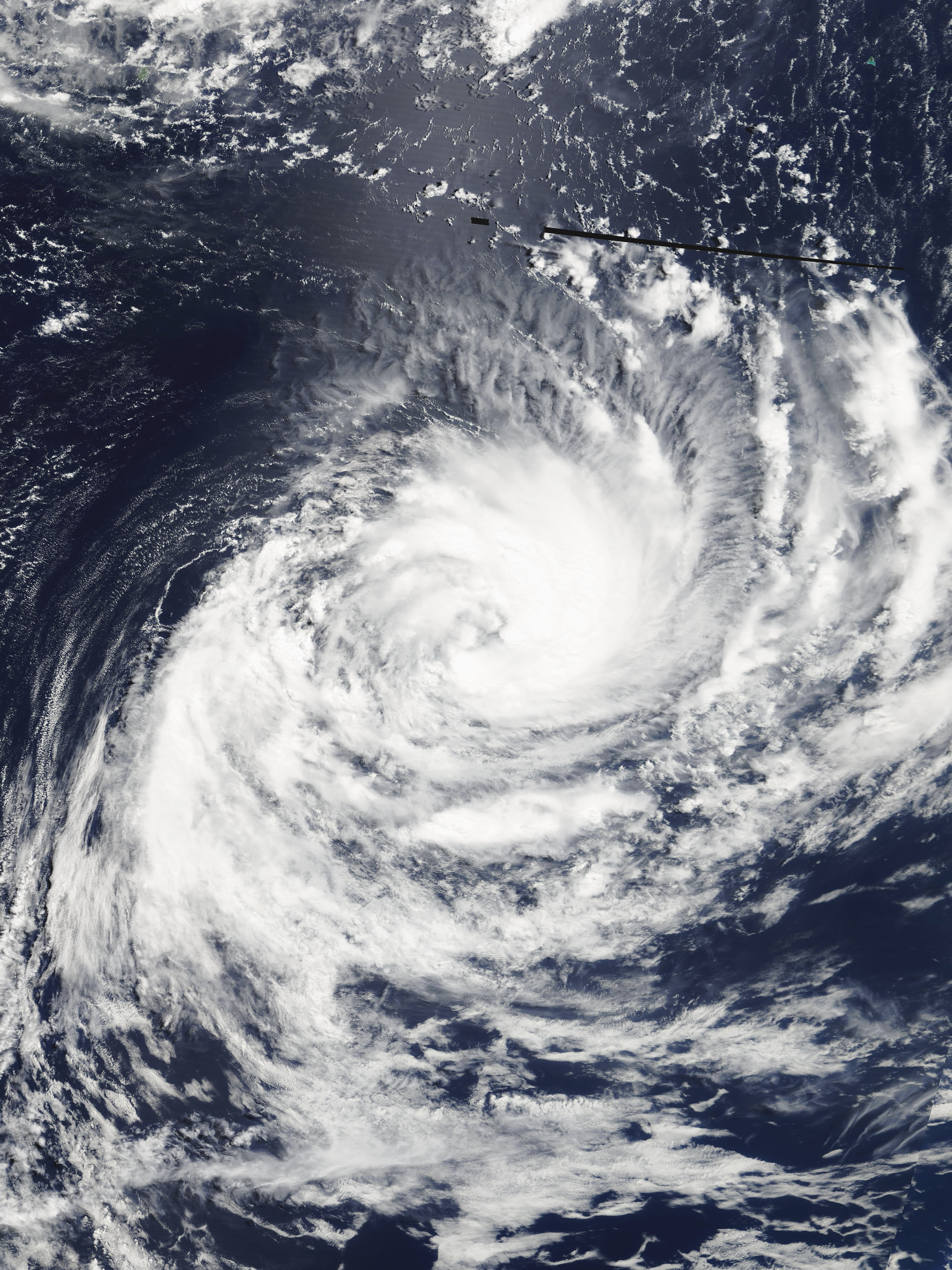
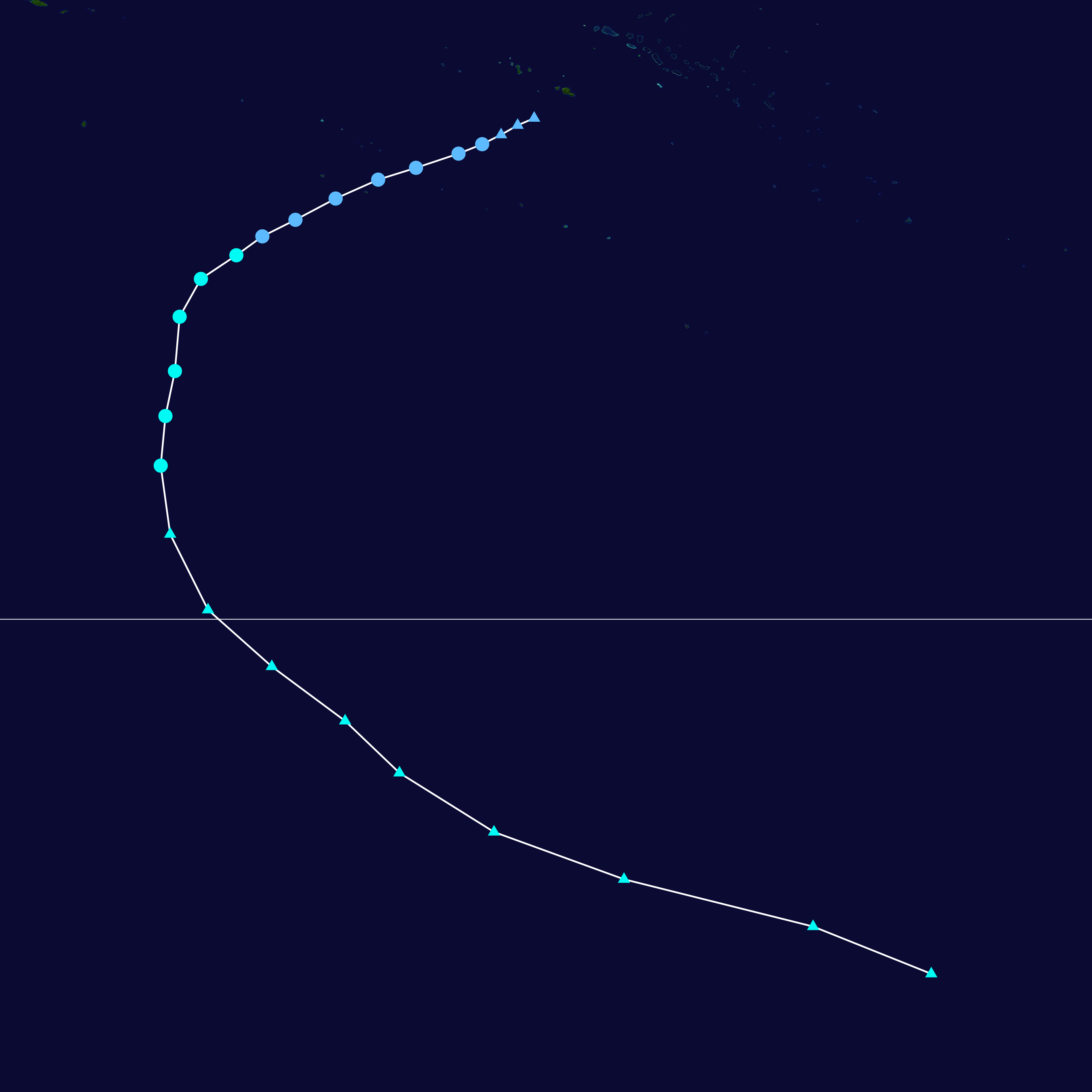
- Duration: March 4 – March 8
- Peak intensity: 95 km/h (60 mph) (10-min); 985 hPa (mbar)

On March 4, RSMC Nadi reported that Tropical Disturbance 14F had developed about 95 km (60 mi) to the west-northwest of French Polynesia under a tropical upper tropospheric trough.

=== Severe Tropical Cyclone Mona ===
- Category 3 severe tropical cyclone (Australian scale)
- Category 1 tropical cyclone (SSHWS)
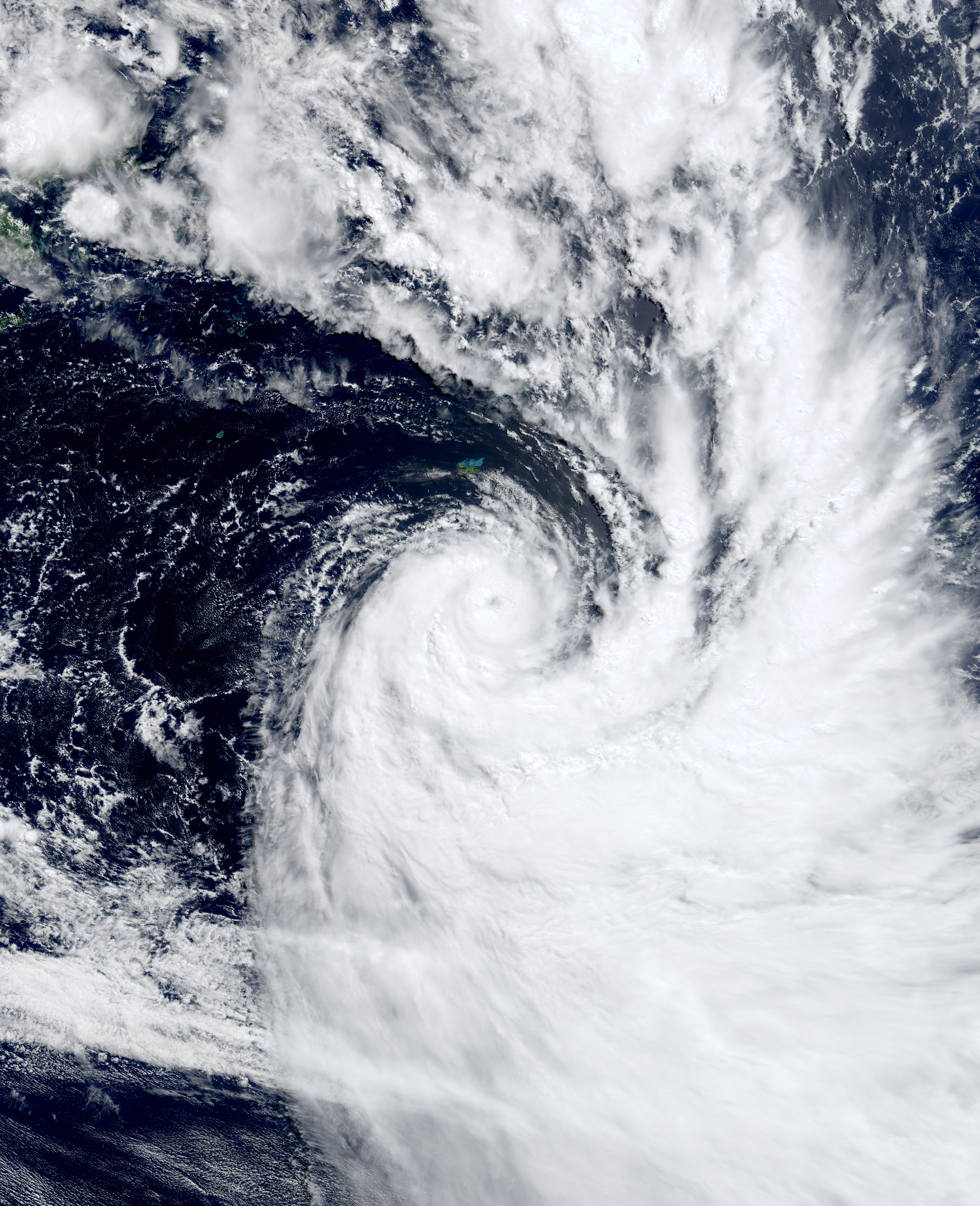
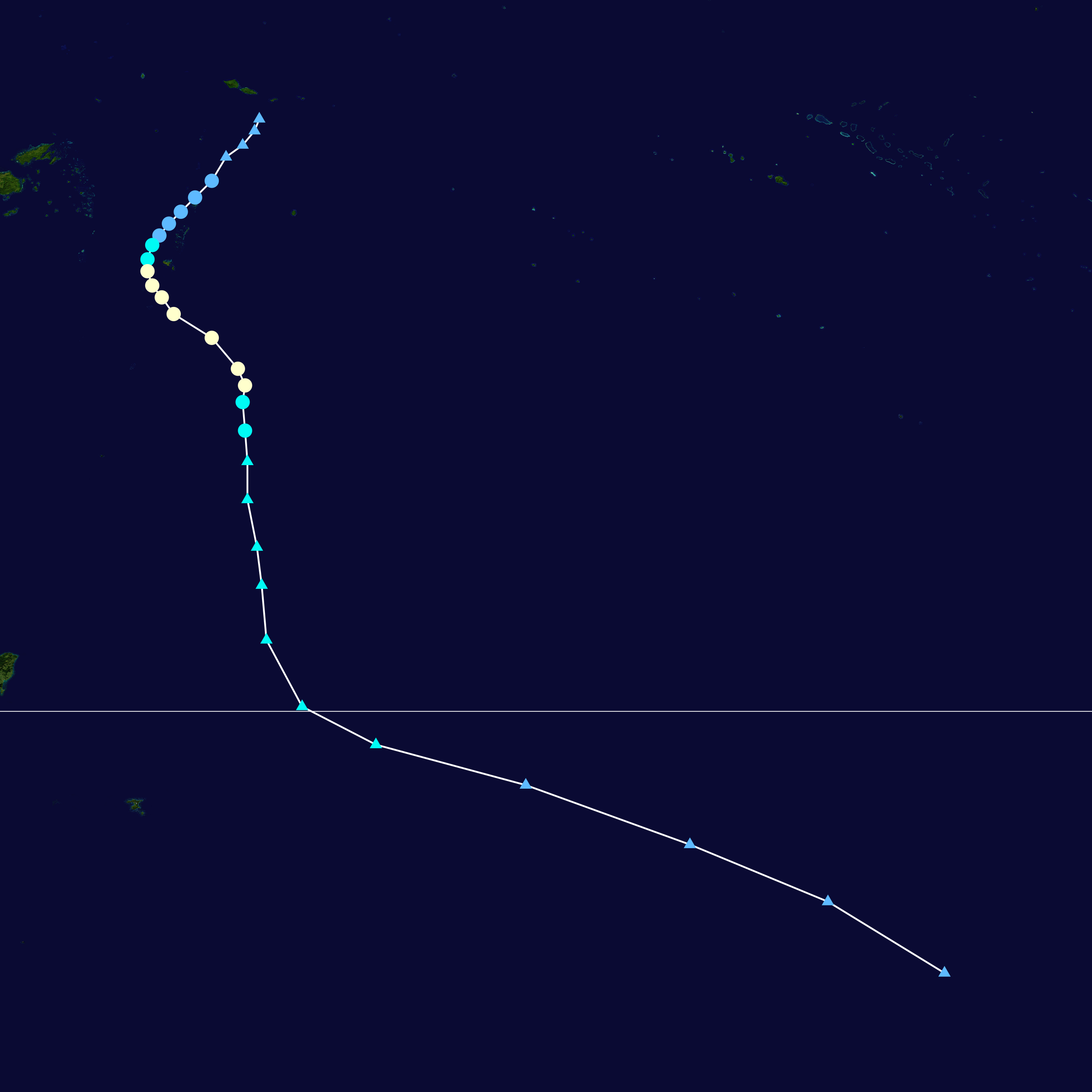
- Duration: March 6 – March 11
- Peak intensity: 140 km/h (85 mph) (10-min); 960 hPa (mbar)

As Leo was developing, a new disturbance formed south of Apia in Western Samoa. The first gale warning was issued on March 7 as it moved closer to northern Tonga. Wind warnings were issued for some islands in Tonga including Vavau, Haapai and Tongatapu. The storm rapidly developed on March 8 at 06:00 UTC, and was named Tropical Cyclone Mona six hours later, while located 75 km (47 mi) west of Haapai and moving slowly southward. A storm warning was put for the whole Tongatapu Group on the 8th. An eye developed on March 9, and Mona was upgraded to hurricane intensity at 0600 UTC, located 55 km (34 mi) west of Tongatapu. Mona moved south-southeastward and accelerated. It reached an intensity of 75 knots (139 km/h) on March 10, 370 km (230 mi) southeast of Tongatapu. NPMOC's 1-min winds were estimated at 80 knots (150 km/h). Minimum pressure of Mona was 965 mbar. It began to weaken rapidly, as it sped off southwards, and became extratropical on March 11 at 12:00 UTC.

In the Vavau and Haapai groups, there was damage to crops, particularly to banana and coconut plantations. There was moderate damage to houses and school buildings in Tongatapu. The unofficial damage assessment, according to the Tongan National Disaster Management Office, totalled Tongan $6 million. A police patrol boat sank off Eua Island in the Tongatapu group.

=== Tropical Disturbance 16F ===
- Tropical disturbance (Australian scale)
- Duration: March 9 – March 12
- Peak intensity: Winds not specified;

=== Tropical Depression 17F (Vaughan) ===
- Tropical depression (Australian scale)
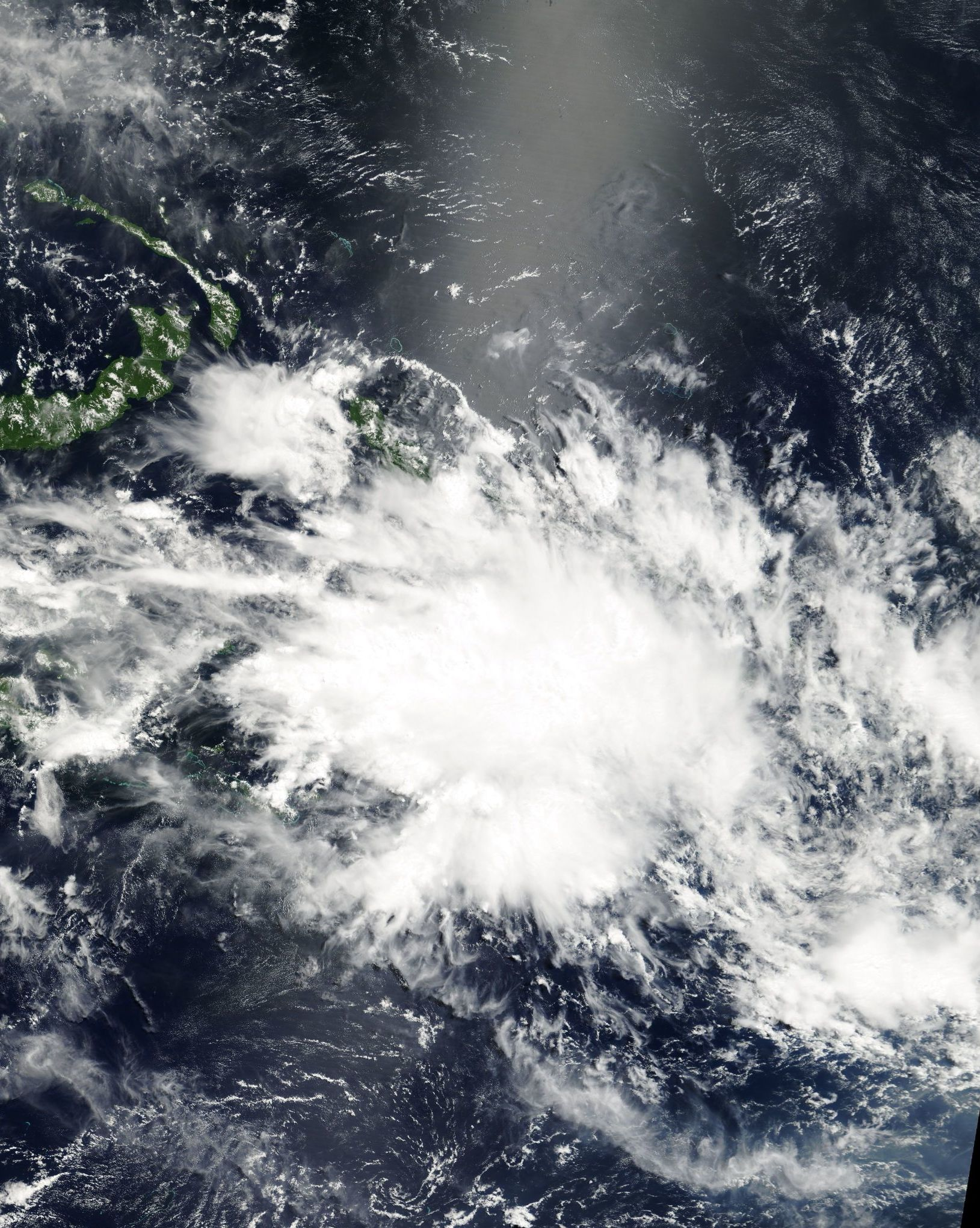
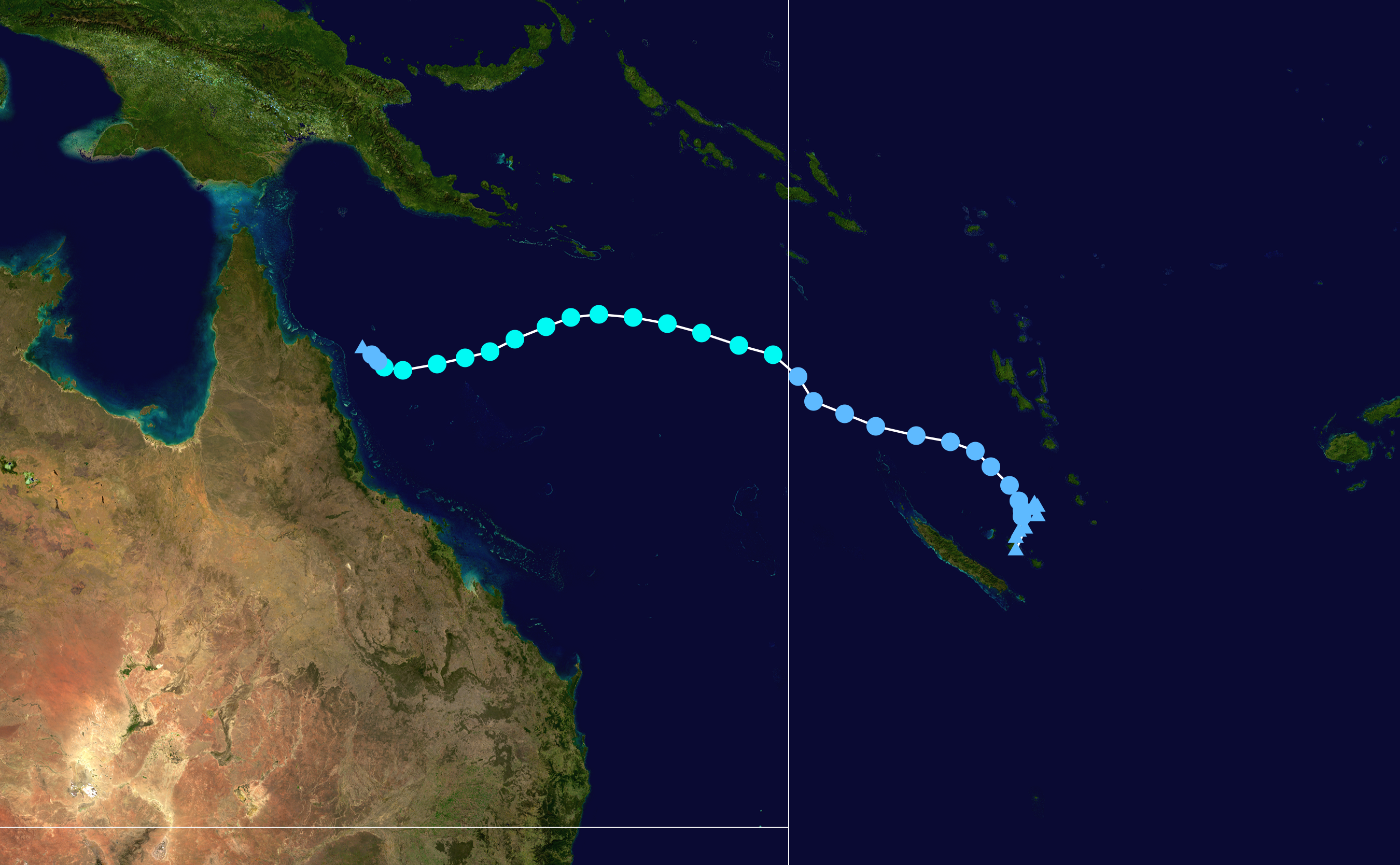
- Duration: March 28 – April 2 (Exited basin)
- Peak intensity: 55 km/h (35 mph) (10-min); 1004 hPa (mbar)

=== Tropical Disturbance 18F ===
- Tropical disturbance (Australian scale)
- Duration: April 10 – April 10
- Peak intensity: Winds not specified;

=== Tropical Cyclone Neil ===
- Category 1 tropical cyclone (Australian scale)
- Tropical storm (SSHWS)
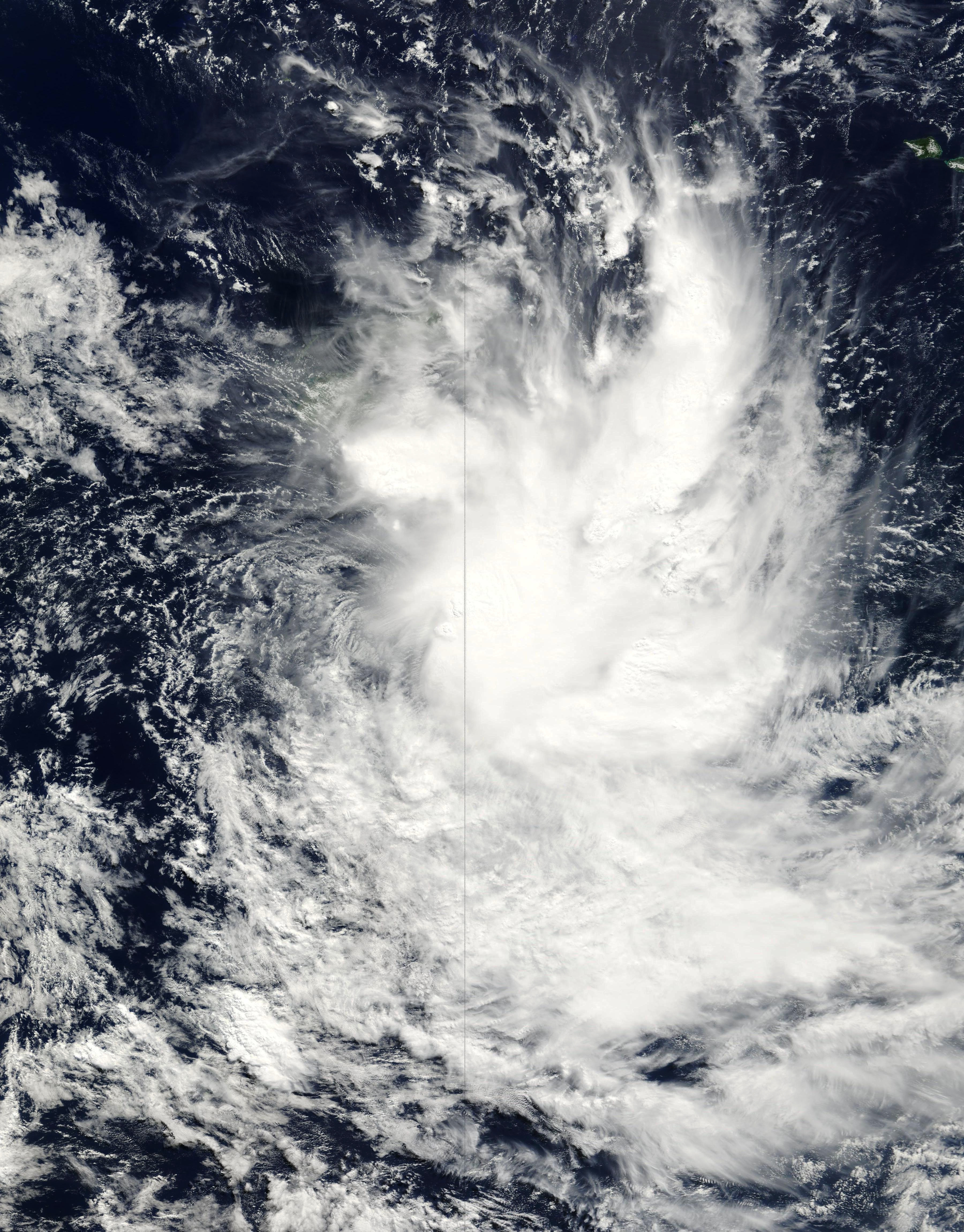
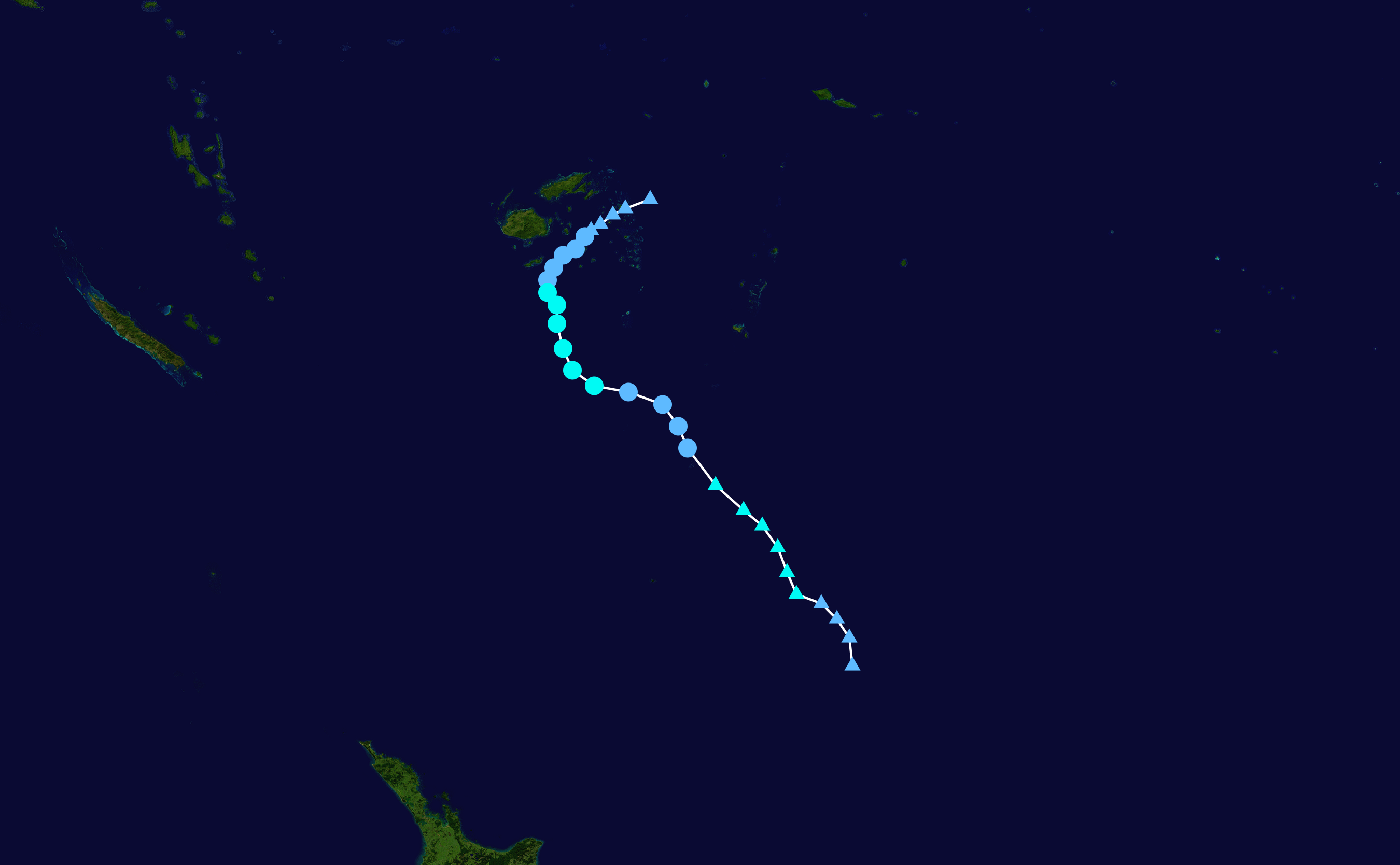
- Duration: April 12 – April 17
- Peak intensity: 75 km/h (45 mph) (10-min); 992 hPa (mbar)

On April 12, RSMC Nadi started monitoring a tropical disturbance, that had developed within a trough of low pressure to the northeast of Fiji. During the next day the system moved southwestwards towards Fiji and developed into a tropical depression, as convention around the center increasing. At 17:00 UTC, it was named Tropical Cyclone Neil, located 150 km (93 mi) southeast of Kadavu. It moved slowly southward, but on April 16 at 12:00 UTC, it was downgraded to a tropical depression.

Damage from Neil was minimal. Kadavu and Ono-i-Lau in Fiji reported gales from Neil, while torrential rain was experienced over some parts of Fiji. There was one fatality due to drowning, but not directly associated with the cyclone.

=== Tropical Depression 20F ===
- Tropical depression (Australian scale)
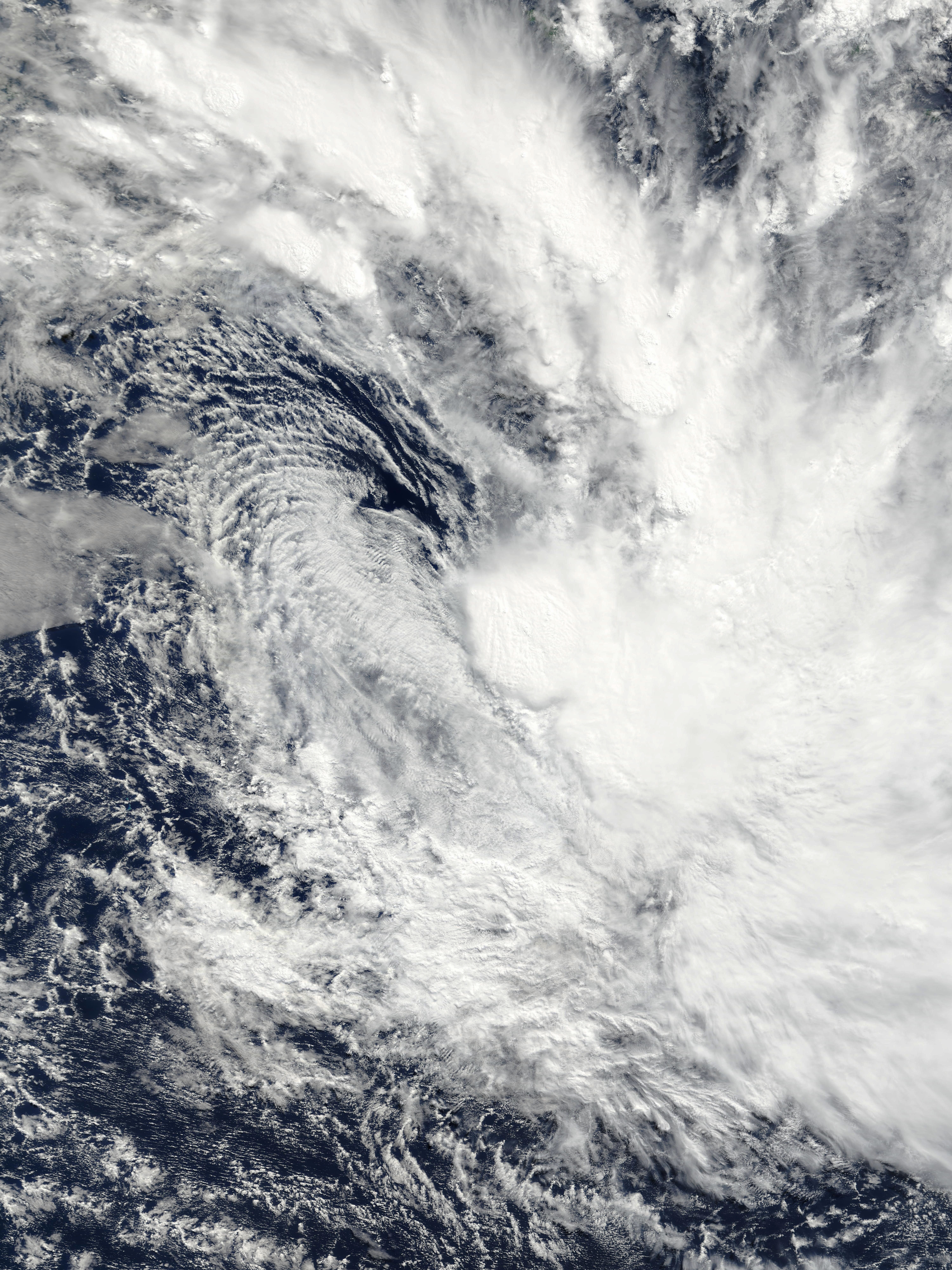
- Duration: April 29 – April 30
- Peak intensity: 75 km/h (45 mph) (10-min); 996 hPa (mbar)

=== Tropical Depression 21F ===
- Tropical depression (Australian scale)
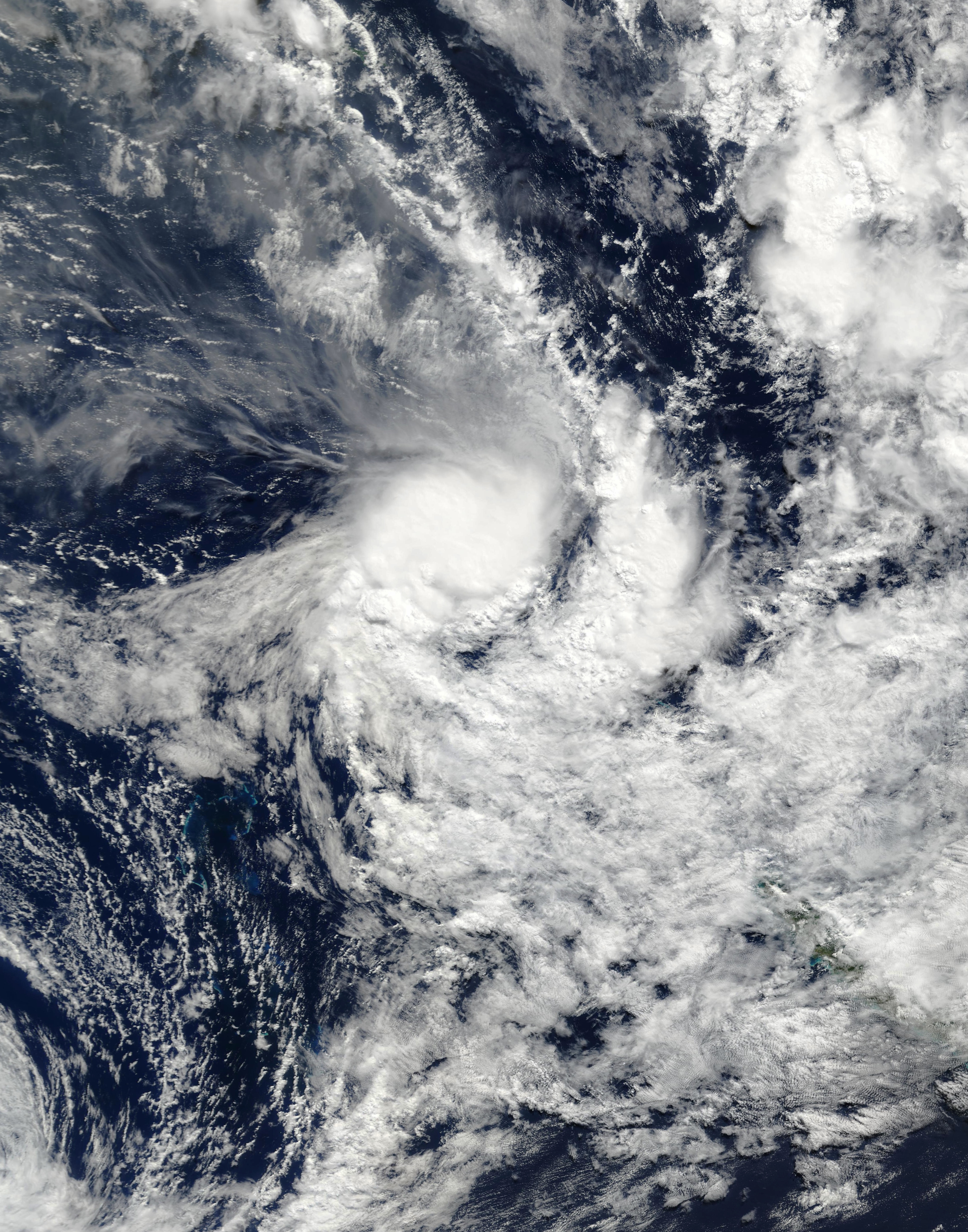
- Duration: April 30 – May 1
- Peak intensity: 75 km/h (45 mph) (10-min); 1000 hPa (mbar)

=== Tropical Depression 22F ===
- Tropical depression (Australian scale)
- Duration: May 3 – May 8
- Peak intensity: 75 km/h (45 mph) (10-min); 1001 hPa (mbar)

=== Other systems ===
On September 5, a tropical depression had developed in conjunction with a weak tropical wave about 600 km (375 mi) to the south-southeast of Port Vila in Vanuatu. During that day the depression moved slowly towards the southeast, while weakening due to the influence of north-westerly windshear, before the final advisory was issued during September 6. Tropical Disturbance 01F and 02F then developed towards the end of November, but remained weak and did not significantly develop. On December 1, Tropical Depression 03F developed near the Vanuatuan islands, over the next few days the depression remained near stationary before it was last noted on December 3. Tropical Depression 04F developed near New Caledonia on December 5, over the next few days it moved quickly towards the east, before weakening during December 7, while located near the Tongan Islands.

On April 10, RSMC Nadi reported that Tropical Disturbance 18F had developed from an upper-level low, the system subsequently moved south-eastwards but was never classified as a tropical depression.

Tropical Disturbance 23F developed between Fiji and Vanuatu during May 6, and was briefly referred to as a tropical depression by RSMC Nadi but it develop further as it was sheared. Tropical Disturbance 24F subsequently developed near the Solomon Island of Rennell during May 20, and moved westwards into the Australian region over the next day.

== Seasonal effects ==
Name	Dates	Peak intensity			Areas affected	Damage (USD)	Deaths	Ref(s).
Name	Dates	Category	Wind speed	Pressure	Areas affected	Damage (USD)	Deaths	Ref(s).
TD	September 5–6	Tropical depression	65 km/h (40 mph)	1,000 hPa (29.53 inHg)	None	None	None	
01F	November 1999	Tropical disturbance	Not specified	Not specified	None	None	None	
02F	November 1999	Tropical disturbance	Not specified	Not specified	None	None	None	
03F	December 1–3	Tropical depression	55 km/h (35 mph)	1,006 hPa (29.71 inHg)	None	None	None	
04F	December 5–7	Tropical depression	65 km/h (40 mph)	1,003 hPa (29.62 inHg)	None	None	None	
06F	January 3–6	Tropical depression	45 km/h (30 mph)	1,004 hPa (29.65 inHg)	None	None	None	
Iris	January 6–10	Category 3 severe tropical cyclone	150 km/h (95 mph)	964 hPa (28.47 inHg)	Vanuatu, Fiji	None	None	
07F	January 16	Tropical disturbance	Not specified	Not specified	None	None	None	
08F	January 20–26	Tropical depression	75 km/h (45 mph)	996 hPa (29.41 inHg)	None	None	None	
Jo	January 23–27	Category 3 severe tropical cyclone	120 km/h (75 mph)	972 hPa (28.70 inHg)	None	None	None	
Kim	February 23–29	Category 4 severe tropical cyclone	165 km/h (105 mph)	935 hPa (27.61 inHg)	French Polynesia	Minimal	None	
13F	February 28–29	Tropical depression	65 km/h (40 mph)	994 hPa (29.35 inHg)	None	None	None	
Leo	March 4–8	Category 2 tropical cyclone	95 km/h (60 mph)	985 hPa (29.09 inHg)	French Polynesia	Minimal	None	
Mona	March 6–11	Category 3 severe tropical cyclone	140 km/h (85 mph)	960 hPa (28.35 inHg)	French Polynesia	Minimal	None	
16F	March 9–12	Tropical disturbance	Not specified	Not specified	None	None	None	
Vaughan	March 28 – April 2	Tropical depression	55 km/h (35 mph)	1,004 hPa (29.65 inHg)	Queensland	None	None	
TD	April 5–6	Tropical depression	Not specified	Not specified	None	None	None	
18F	April 10	Tropical disturbance	Not specified	Not specified	None	None	None	
Neil	April 13–17	Category 1 tropical cyclone	75 km/h (45 mph)	992 hPa (29.29 inHg)	Fiji	None	None	
20F	April 29–30	Tropical depression	75 km/h (45 mph)	996 hPa (29.41 inHg)	Queensland	Minimal	None	
21F	April 30 – May 1	Tropical depression	75 km/h (45 mph)	1,000 hPa (29.53 inHg)	Queensland	Minimal	None	
22F	May 3–8	Tropical depression	75 km/h (45 mph)	1,001 hPa (29.56 inHg)	None	None	None	
23F	May 6	Tropical depression	Not specified	Not specified	None	None	None	
24F	May 20–21	Tropical disturbance	Not specified	1,008 hPa (29.77 inHg)	None	None	None	
Season aggregates
25 systems	September 5 – May 21		165 km/h (105 mph)	935 hPa (27.61 inHg)				

== See also ==
- List of Southern Hemisphere tropical cyclone seasons
- Atlantic hurricane seasons: 1999, 2000
- Pacific hurricane seasons: 1999, 2000
- Pacific typhoon seasons: 1999, 2000
- North Indian Ocean cyclone seasons: 1999, 2000
