= Mitema Tapati =

French Polynesian politician

Member of the French Polynesian Assembly for Windward Isles 1
- Incumbent
- Assumed office 11 May 2023

Personal details
- Born: 1960
- Party: Tāvini Huiraʻatira

Mitema Tapati (born 1960) is a French Polynesian pastor, anti-nuclear activist, and politician. He is a member of Tāvini Huiraʻatira.

Tapati was educated in Ua Pou and Nuku Hiva in the Marquesas Islands. He worked as a contractor at the French nuclear test site on Moruroa before becoming a pastor in the Maohi Protestant Church. He served as vice-president of anti-nuclear group Mururoa e Tatou. During the COVID-19 pandemic he protested against compulsory vaccination.

He was first elected to the Assembly of French Polynesia in the 2023 French Polynesian legislative election.

In November 2023 during the assembly budget session he complained that "France is becoming black, here we are becoming white... We all know it, they arrive by plane, by boat, in the offices". He was subsequently accused by Heiura-Les Verts of promoting the Great Replacement theory, and Tāpura Huiraʻatira requested that he be sanctioned.
