= Roland Oldham =

French Polynesian teacher (1950–2019)

Roland Oldham (1950 — 16 March 2019) was a French Polynesian teacher, unionist, and anti-nuclear campaigner. He was president of Mururoa e Tatou from its foundation until his death. He was a grandson of French Polynesian writer Te Arapo.

Oldham was born in Papeete. After working as a teacher in Mo'orea, he moved to New Zealand and then Australia. After returning to French Polynesia in the 1980s he became involved in the trade union movement. In 1995 he joined Greenpeace to protest against French nuclear testing in the Pacific. In 2001, alongside John Doom, he founded Mururoa e Tatou to campaign for compensation for French nuclear test workers and victims. In 2009 he was threatened with prosecution after calling a court decision against compensating test victims an example of colonial justice.
