= Sonia Taae =

French Polynesian politician

Mayor of Papara
- Incumbent
- Assumed office 2020

Member of the French Polynesian Assembly for Windward Isles 2
- Incumbent
- Assumed office 11 May 2023

Personal details
- Born: 1959
- Party: Tāpura Huiraʻatira

Sonia Taae (born 1959) is a French Polynesian politician and member of the Assembly of French Polynesia. She is a member of Tāpura Huiraʻatira. She is the wife of politician Putai Taae.

In 2020, she was elected Mayor of Papara, an office formerly occupied by her husband. She lost her majority as mayor in December 2021, but regained it in March 2022 after forming a coalition with Clément Le Gayic.

She was elected to the Assembly of French Polynesia in the 2023 French Polynesian legislative election.
