= Cathy Puchon =

French Polynesian politician

Member of the French Polynesian Assembly for Windward Isles 3
- Incumbent
- Assumed office 30 April 2023

Personal details
- Born: 1957 (age 68–69) Vanuatu
- Party: Tāpura Huiraʻatira

Catherine Puchon (born 1957) is a French Polynesian dancer, politician and Member of the Assembly of French Polynesia. She is a member of Tāpura Huiraʻatira.

Puchon was born in Vanuatu and is of Wallisean descent. She started dancing at the age of 17 with the Temaeva troupe under Coco Hotahota. She worked as a secretary, and in 2014 she was elected as a municipal councillor in Punaauia. In 2020 she took over as leader of Temaeva after Coco Hotahota's death.

She was first elected to the Assembly of French Polynesia as a Tāpura candidate in the 2023 French Polynesian legislative election.
