= Rachelle Florès =

French Polynesian politician

Member of the French Polynesian Assembly for Leeward Isles
- Incumbent
- Assumed office 30 April 2023

Personal details
- Born: 1979 (age 46–47)
- Party: Tāvini Huiraʻatira

Rachelle Florès (born 1979) is a French Polynesian politician and Member of the Assembly of French Polynesia. She is a member of Tāvini Huiraʻatira.

Florès is from Bora Bora and has a degree in law. In 2000 she founded the Rauti Tama association and worked as an educator.

She was first elected to the Assembly of French Polynesia during the 2023 French Polynesian legislative election.
