= Tevahiarii Teraiarue =

French Polynesian politician

Member of the French Polynesian Assembly for Leeward Isles
- Incumbent
- Assumed office 30 April 2023

Personal details
- Born: 1990
- Party: Tāvini Huiraʻatira

Tevahiarii Teraiarue (born 1990) is a French Polynesian politician and member of the Assembly of French Polynesia. He is a member of Tāvini Huiraʻatira.

Teraiarue is a farmer. In 2020 he was elected delegate-mayor of Tiva, but his predecessor Maima Bennet refused to step down, resulting in a court case.

He was elected to the Assembly of French Polynesia at the 2023 French Polynesian legislative election.
