= Teave Chaumette =

French Polynesian politician

Member of the French Polynesian Assembly for Windward Isles 1
- Incumbent
- Assumed office 11 May 2023

Personal details
- Born: 1969
- Party: Fetia Api; A here ia Porinetia

Teave Chaumette (born 1969) is a French Polynesian civil servant and politician. She is a member of A here ia Porinetia.

Chaumette studied in the United States, before working as a civil servant in the Ministry of Women's Affairs and the Ministry of Youth and Sports. She was president of Polynésie Alzheimer before organising the "solidarity for all" collective. At the 2012 French legislative election she campaigned alongside Philip Schyle as his substitute, but he was not elected. In 2015 she was a member of the support committee for the government of Édouard Fritch.

She ran as an A here ia Porinetia candidate in the 2023 French Polynesian legislative election and was elected to the Assembly of French Polynesia.
