= Mont Mokoto =

Mountain in French Polynesia

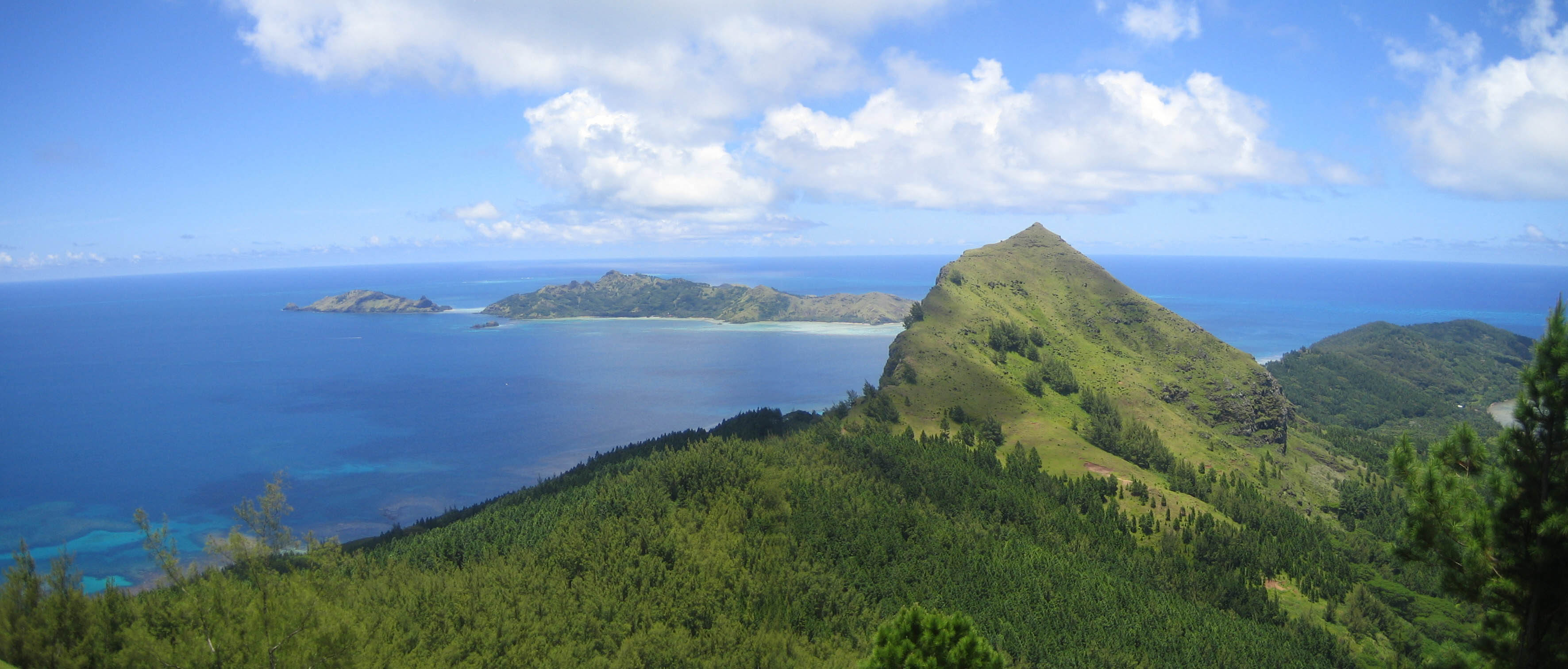

Highest point
- Elevation: 426 m (1,398 ft)
- Prominence: 170 m (560 ft)
- Coordinates: 23°7′39″S 134°59′9″W

Geography
- Location within Oceania
- Location: Mangareva, French Polynesia

Mont Mokoto is a mountain located in the South Pacific, on the island of Mangareva. It has an elevation of 426 metres (1,398 ft) above sea level and is north of the town of Rikitea.
