= Rikitea =

Town on Mangareva, part of the Gambier Islands in French Polynesia

- Town
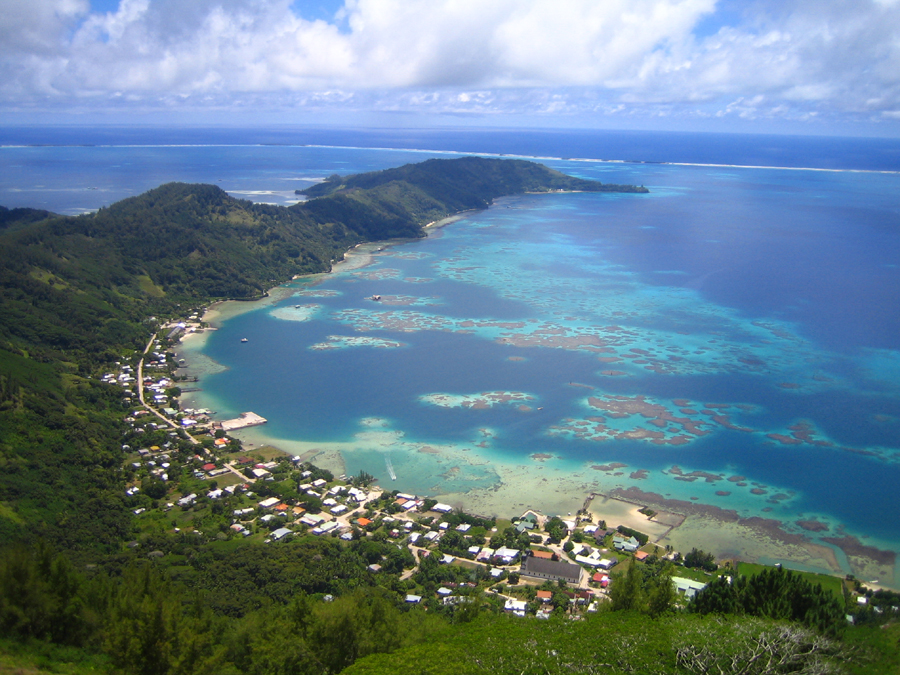
- View of Rikitea

- Location in French Polynesia
- Coordinates: 23°7′13″S 134°58′9″W
- Country: France
- Overseas collectivity: French Polynesia
- Territory: Gambier Islands
- Island: Mangareva

Rikitea is a small town on Mangareva, an island in the Gambier Islands in French Polynesia. A majority of the islanders live in Rikitea. The island was a protectorate of France in 1871 and was annexed in 1881.

== History ==
The town's history dates to the era when the island was first settled with people from the Marquesas Islands in 1100 AD. Captain James Wilson of the London Missionary Society arrived in 1797 on Duff, naming the islands after the English Admiral James Gambier who had facilitated his expedition.

Before the Catholic missionaries' arrival, cannibalism was practiced under the rule of the local kings. French Picpus priests Father François Caret and Father Honoré Laval, of the Congregation for the Sacred Hearts, landed here in 1834. They arrived from Chile. Father Hippolyte Roussel, who had arrived at Rikitea with more than 100 Rapa Nui people on 4 July 1871, assumed charge of Laval's Rikitea mission, and served there till he died in 1898. The figure of 9,000, mentioned by some, when Laval arrived is regarded as being hugely exaggerated. In 1825, the population was estimated at 1500. When the missionaries arrived in 1834 they counted 2,124 souls. Increasing contact with the outside world brought contagious diseases to Mangareva savagely decimating the population. There had already been several major epidemics before 1863, including one which is said have killed half the population. The story about Laval driving the population to their deaths was spread by a French judge, Louis Jacolliot, who dabbled in the occult and had a grudge against Laval and wanted to discredit him. For 9,000 people to have lived on the islands, many would have to live on the hillsides due to the small amount of flat ground, but there is no evidence of houses ever being built there. Also, if 8,500 people died because of Laval, there would be that number of graves, or at least mass graves, but there is not.

== Geography ==
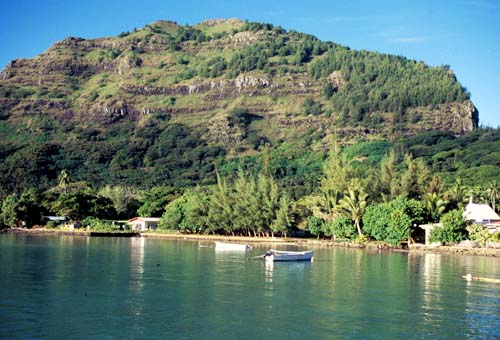
Rikitea in the foreground and Mont Duff in the background

Rikitea is a port town and tourist center situated on Mangareva Lagoon, which contains a number of motu. It is about 1,650 kilometres (1,030 mi) southeast of Tahiti, to the North of the Tropic of Capricorn. The average elevation of the town is 8 metres (26 ft).

The total population of the island was 1100 and most of them lived in Rikitea.

Two mountains, Mt. Duff (482 metres (1,581 ft)) and Mt. Mokoto (426 metres (1,398 ft)), which are approachable by trails, are north of the town. The climb to Duff's peak takes about 90 minutes. The stones found on the hill were used by the ethnic Mangarevans to predict weather and to look for boats headed for the island. The mountain is covered with tall aeho grass.

== Economy ==
Black pearls are cultured on numerous platforms on both sides of the Mangareva lagoon. The lagoon is full of corals and black-lipped oysters are harvested by the people. The inhabitants are also involved in agriculture and fishing to the minimum level. The church is involved in technical school (CED, "Center for Educational Development) to train people in skill trades such as carpentry, mechanics, electricity, and mother-of-pearl shell engraving.

== Landmarks ==
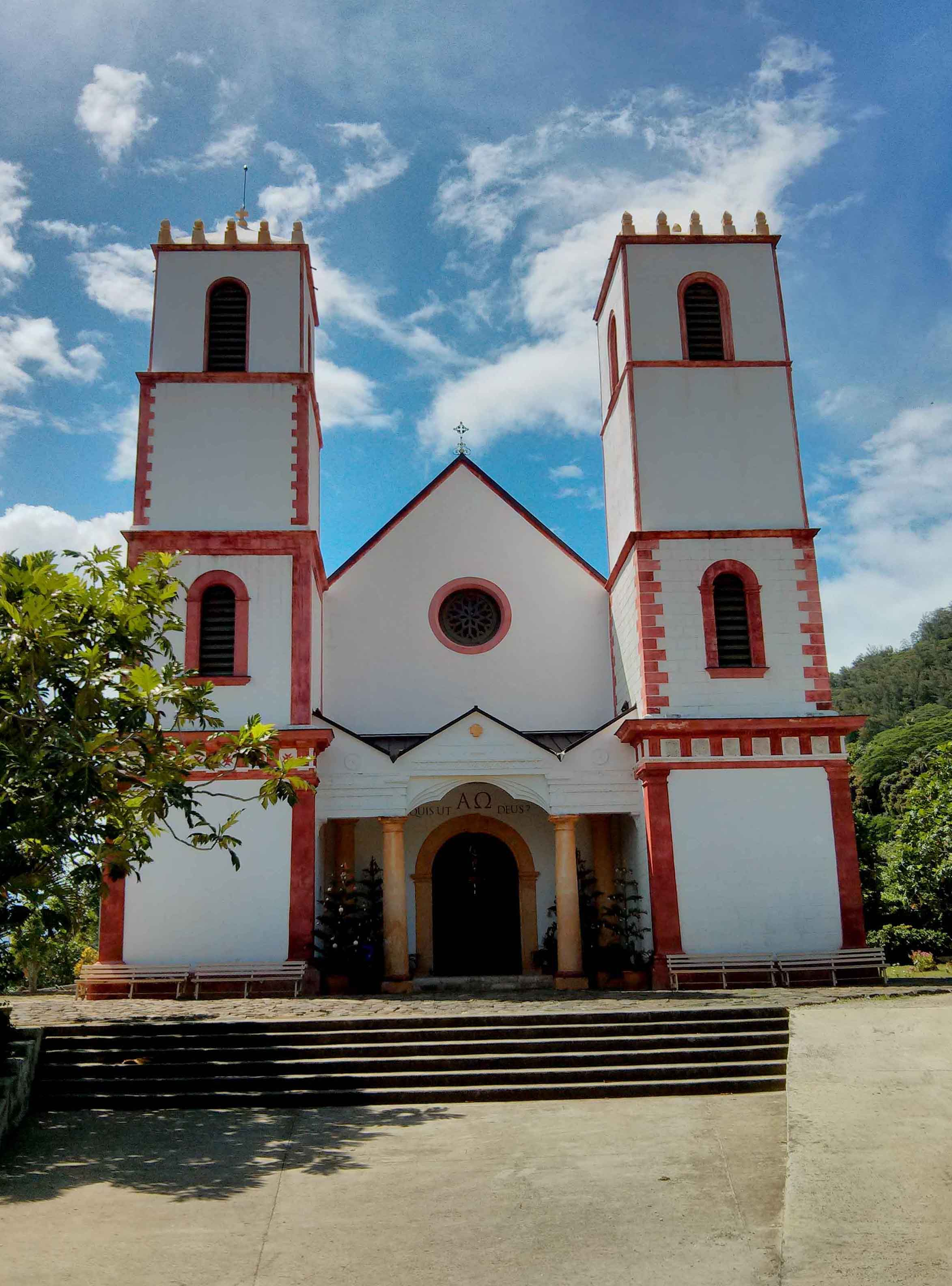
St. Michael's Cathedral

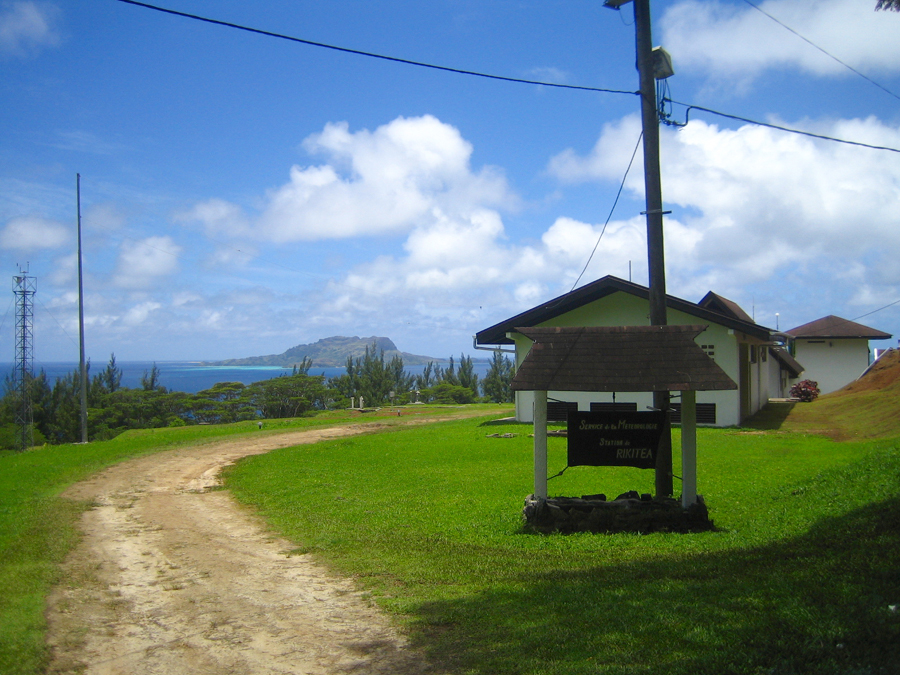
Meteorological station

Father Honoré Laval built 116 stone buildings and arches, and roads were laid. Buildings included a fortified palace with follies as well as St. Michael's Cathedral which has also been characterized as a folly. The structures were built with shaped coral stone blocks. Several of the structures dating to Laval's time still remain, such as the watch towers on the coast and a turret, the remains of the palace built for Maputeoa, the last king of the island. King Maputeoa's crypt is in the St. Pierre's Chapel behind the neo-Gothic St. Michael's Cathedral.

The Couvent Rouru (Rouru Convent), near the southern end of the cemetery, is now in ruins, but housed 60 nuns at one time. There is a carving school near the cathedral at Camika CED which features mother of pearl carvings. Here training is provided in the art of shell engraving. Pendants and barrettes created here can be purchased at the centre's sales outlet. Riktea has a large nuclear fall-out shelter which was built at the time of the French atmospheric testing at Moruroa.

The town also has post office, a few shops, a military establishment, a medical room, and schools. Accommodation of note includes Chez Pierre et Mariette near the wharf, with three rooms, and Pension Bianca et Benoit, in the southern part of the town.

== Transportation ==
The town is accessed by air and by ship. The airport is located on Mou Totegegie, 9 kilometres (5.6 mi) to the northeast. From the airport, boats provide the only access to Rikitea. Flights operate from Pape'ete and take four and half hours. Travel by ship originates only from Pape'ete, a journey of 21 days, with stops at four other islands before arriving at the Rikitea. A 28-kilometre (17 mi) road circles the entire island.

== Bibliography ==
- Brash, Celeste; Carillet, Jean-Bernard (2009). Tahiti and French Polynesia. Lonely Planet. ISBN 978-1-74104-316-7.
- Fischer, Steven R. (1997). Rongorongo: The Easter Island Script : History, Traditions, Texts. Clarendon Press. ISBN 978-0-19-823710-5.
- Kelly, Alexis C. (21 October 2008). Fodor's Tahiti & French Polynesia. Fodor's Travel Publications. ISBN 978-1-4000-0683-0.
- Stanley, David (1999). South Pacific Handbook. David Stanley. p. 266. ISBN 978-1-56691-172-6.
- Stanley, David (2004). Moon Handbooks South Pacific. David Stanley. p. 268. ISBN 978-1-56691-411-6.
