= Mururoa e Tatou =

French Polynesian non-governmental organisation

Mururoa e Tatou ("Mururoa and Us") is an anti-nuclear non-governmental organisation in French Polynesia. The association represents former workers at the French nuclear test sites of Mururoa and Fangataufa, and advocates for their compensation. Founded in July 2001 by John Doom and Roland Oldham, it is currently led by Hirohiti Tefaarere.

Mururoa e Tatou has advocated for compensation for test site veterans and demanded that the French government recognise their health problems. It has supported court cases seeking compensation, and opposed France's nuclear compensation law as too restrictive.

It has also advocated for greater transparency around the effects of nuclear testing. In 2005 Mururoa e Tatou revealed leaked documents showing that the French government had knowingly exposed the people of Mangareva to nuclear fallout. In 2005 it asked the Assembly of French Polynesia to conduct an inquiry. The inquiry reported back in 2006.

In October 2010 it obtained a court order ordering the French Defence Ministry to declassify and disclose all information relating to nuclear testing. When the documents were finally released in 2013 they revealed that fallout had been far worse than previously disclosed.

== See also ==
- Association 193
