= Milou Ebb =

French Polynesian politician

President of the Assembly of French Polynesia
- In office 6 April 1995 – 23 May 1996
- Preceded by: Jean Juventin
- Succeeded by: Justin Arapari

Mayor of Teva I Uta
- In office March 1977 – 2001
- Preceded by: None (position created)
- Succeeded by: Victor Doom

Minister of Health and Social Affairs
- In office March 1978 – July 1979

Member of the French Polynesian Assembly for Windward Islands
- In office 29 May 1977 – 5 May 2001

Personal details
- Born: 27 October 1934 Papeete, French Polynesia
- Died: 13 March 2009
- Party: Here Ai'a; Te Aratia o te Nunaa; Tahoera'a Huiraatira

Tinomana Milou Ebb (27 October 1934 – 13 March 2009) was a French Polynesian politician and Cabinet Minister who served as president of the Assembly of French Polynesia from 1995 to 1996 and Mayor of Teva I Uta from 1977 to 2001. He was a member of Here Ai'a. He was the father of politician Valentina Cross.

Ebb was born in Papeetee and grew up in the Leeward Islands before moving to Mataiea to become a farmer. He became involved in business, and was chair of the Marama Nui electricity company. As chair, he commissioned the first hydroelectric power station in Papeari in 1981.

He unsuccessfully contested the 1972 French Polynesian legislative election as a candidate for Here Ai'a. He was elected as mayor of Teva I Uta in March 1977, and later that year was elected to the Assembly of French Polynesia in the 1977 election as a United Front candidate. Following the resignation of Jean Juventin in March 1978 he was appointed to the governing council as Minister of Health and Social Affairs. He resigned from the council in July 1979. He was re-elected at the 1982 election.

Following the death of Here Ai'a leader John Teariki in 1983 Ebb seemed likely to succeed him, but lost the position to Juventin. He subsequently split from the party and founded Te Aratia o te Nunaa. Despite the split, at the 1986 election he ran alongside Juventin as part of the Amuitahira'a No Polynesia coalition, and at the 1991 election as part of the Polynesian Union. A coalition deal with president Gaston Flosse saw Juventin elected president of the Assembly, with Ebb as first vice-president. He rejoined Here Ai'a, but was thrown out of the party in June 1994 when the coalition collapsed. Ebb formed a new party, Te Avei’a Mau, which supported Flosse's government. As a result, he was elected president of the Assembly in April 1995. He was re-elected at the 1996 election, but was the only member from his party. He lost the position of Assembly president, and subsequently joined Tahoera'a Huiraatira.

After suffering a heart attack in December 2000, he was evacuated to New Zealand for medical treatment. He retired from politics in 2001.

== Honours ==
He was made a knight of the Ordre des Palmes académiques and the Ordre national du Mérite.

In 2016 a school in Mataiea was named after him.
