= Jacques Tauraa =

French Polynesian politician (1920–1980)

President of the Assembly of French Polynesia
- In office 6 November 1962 – 17 May 1968
- Preceded by: Frantz Vanizette
- Succeeded by: Jean Millaud
- In office 20 May 1959 – 2 March 1961
- Preceded by: Georges Leboucher
- Succeeded by: Frantz Vanizette

Minister of Economic Affairs
- In office 11 December 1957 – 28 October 1958
- President: Pouvanaa a Oopa

Member of the French Polynesian Assembly for Windward Islands
- In office 3 November 1957 – 16 May 1968

Personal details
- Born: 4 February 1920 Papeete, French Polynesia
- Died: 12 February 1980 Nouméa, New Caledonia
- Party: Democratic Rally of the Tahitian People; Here Ai'a

Jacques Tauraa (4 February 1920 – 12 February 1980) was a French Polynesian politician and Cabinet Minister who was the longest-serving president of the Assembly of French Polynesia. He was a member of the Democratic Rally of the Tahitian People (RDPT).

Tauraa was born in Papeete and was a farmer. He was president of the Chamber of Agriculture until 1957, when his membership of the pro-independence Democratic Rally of the Tahitian People caused him to lose the position.

He was elected to the Assembly of French Polynesia in the 1957 French Polynesian legislative election and appointed Minister of Economic Affairs in the government of Pouvanaa a Oopa. He was a proponent of "yes" (remain part of France, rather than become independent) in the 1958 French Polynesian constitutional referendum. He lost his position as a Minister when the French colonial government dissolved Oopa's government following the referendum, but was subsequently elected by the Assembly to the resulting interim government. In May 1959 he was elected president of the Assembly.

Following Oopa's prosecution, conviction and exile for arson he became the leader of the RDPT. He was re-elected in the 1962 election and elected president of the Assembly, a position he held for the next six years. As president of the Assembly, Tauraa opposed the use of French Polynesia as a nuclear test site. He also supported an income tax to provide financial independence from France.

Following the dissolution of the RDPT by the colonial authorities, Tauraa joined Teariki's Here Ai'a. A dispute with Teariki over who the party should back in the 1965 French presidential election saw Tauraa and many of the RDPT's MP's expelled from the party in 1966. In 1967 he founded a new party, the Regrouping of the Tahitian People, to contest the 1967 election, but failed to secure re-election.

== Personal life ==
Tauraa's brother-in-law was Jacques Drollet.
