= 1977 French Polynesian legislative election =

- 29 May 1977
- All 30 seats in the Territorial Assembly; 15 seats needed for a majority
Party	Leader	Vote %	Seats	+/–
United Front	Francis Sanford	36.43	13	
Tāhōʻēraʻa Huiraʻatira	Gaston Flosse	23.42	10	+2
E'a Api		4.20	3	
Pupu Taina			1	New
Taatira Polynesia			1	New
Te Au Tahoeraa			1	−1
UTP			1	0
This lists parties that won seats. See the complete results below.

Legislative elections were held in French Polynesia on 29 May 1977 for the Territorial Assembly. Autonomist parties won a majority, with the United Front of Francis Sanford winning 13 seats and Sanford allies a further five.

== Contesting parties ==
Prior to the elections, Sanford formed the United Front for Internal Autonomy alliance, consisting of Here Ai'a, E'a Api and other minor parties, although E'a Api ran separately in the Leeward Islands, Marquesas and the Tuamotu–Gambier Islands constituency.

The Tahoera'a Huiraatira party was formed as a successor to the Tahoeraa Maohi alliance of the Tahitian Union and Union for the New Republic.

== Results ==
Party	Votes	%	Seats	+/–
United Front	17,083	36.43	13	–
Tahoera'a Huiraatira	10,982	23.42	10	+2
E'a Api	1,972	4.20	3	–
Pupu Taina	16,862	35.95	1	New
Taatira Polynesia	16,862	35.95	1	New
Te Au Tahoeraa	16,862	35.95	1	–1
Union of Workers and Fishermen	16,862	35.95	1	0
Other parties	16,862	35.95	0	–
Total	46,899	100.00	30	0
Source: Assembly, Henningham

=== Elected members ===
Constituency	Member	Party	Notes
Austral Islands	Pierre Hunter	United Front	Re-elected
Austral Islands	Jacques Teheiura	Tahoera'a Huiraatira	
Leeward Islands	Roger Amiot	E'a Api	Re-elected
Leeward Islands	Philippe Brotherson	United Front	Re-elected
Leeward Islands	Marc Davio	United Front	
Leeward Islands	Marcel Hart	Tahoera'a Huiraatira	Re-elected (previously Safeguard the Leeward Islands)
Leeward Islands	Pupure Maiarii	Tahoera'a Huiraatira	
Leeward Islands	Toro Teriirere	United Front	Re-elected
Marquesas Islands	Léon Lichtlé	E'a Api	
Marquesas Islands	Guy Rauzy	E'a Api	Re-elected
Tuamotu–Gambier Islands	Émilie Jouette	Tahoera'a Huiraatira	
Tuamotu–Gambier Islands	Riquet Marere	Tahoera'a Huiraatira	Re-elected
Tuamotu–Gambier Islands	André Porlier	Union of Workers and Fishermen	Re-elected
Windward Islands	Franklin Brotherson	Tahoera'a Huiraatira	
Windward Islands	Joël Buillard	United Front	
Windward Islands	Arthur Chung	Taatira Polynesia	
Windward Islands	Milou Ebb	United Front	
Windward Islands	Gaston Flosse	Tahoera'a Huiraatira	Re-elected
Windward Islands	Jean Juventin	United Front	
Windward Islands	Michel Law	Pupu Taina	Re-elected (previously Te Au Tahoeraa–Tomite Taufa)
Windward Islands	Tuianu Le Gayic	Tahoera'a Huiraatira	Re-elected
Windward Islands	Alexandre Léontieff	Tahoera'a Huiraatira	
Windward Islands	André Lorfevre	United Front	Re-elected
Windward Islands	Daniel Millaud	United Front	Re-elected
Windward Islands	Francis Sanford	United Front	Re-elected
Windward Islands	Teriivetua Tama	United Front	
Windward Islands	Charles Taufa	Te Au Tahoeraa	Re-elected
Windward Islands	John Teariki	United Front	Re-elected
Windward Islands	Jacques Teuira	Tahoera'a Huiraatira	Re-elected
Windward Islands	Frantz Vanizette	United Front	Re-elected (previously Te Au Tahoeraa–Tomite Taufa)
Source: Assembly of French Polynesia

== Aftermath ==
Following the elections, Frantz Vanizette was chosen as the President of the Assembly. Sanford and Jean Juventin were appointed to the Government Council and were replaced in the Assembly by Paul Pietri and André Toomaru.
