= Rudy Bambridge =

French Polynesian politician

Member of the French Polynesian Assembly for Windward Islands
- In office 3 November 1957 – March 1969

Personal details
- Born: 28 February 1926 Papeete, Tahiti
- Died: 1982
- Party: Democratic and Socialist Union of the Resistance; Tahitian Union; Tahitian Democratic Union
- Profession: Politician

Rudolf Tenahe Bambridge (28 February 1926 - 1982) was a French Polynesian lawyer and politician, who led the anti-independence Tahitian Union during the 1950s and 1960s. He was the son of politician Tony Bambridge.

Bambridge was born in Papeete and educated in Noumea, New Caledonia. After studying law in France he worked as a defence lawyer in Papeete. At the behest of his father he became involved in politics to oppose the pro-independence Democratic Rally of the Tahitian People (RDPT). He ran for the French National Assembly as a candidate for the Democratic and Socialist Union of the Resistance in the 1956 French legislative election, losing to Pouvanaa a Oopa. He then founded the Tahitian Union to contest the 1957 French Polynesian legislative election, and was elected to the Assembly of French Polynesia. In the Assembly, he led opposition to the RDPT government, and was a major figure in the riots which overturned its income tax policy and toppled the government. He campaigned against independence in the 1958 French Polynesian constitutional referendum, and served as prosecutor in Oopa's subsequent arson trial. Following Oopa's conviction, he was stripped of his seat in the National Assembly, and Bambridge ran in the resulting by-election, but lost to Marcel Oopa.

He was re-elected to the Assembly at the 1962 election as leader of the UT, and again at the 1967 election. He resigned his seat in the Assembly in March 1969 to take up a position on the French Economic and Social Council. In July 1971 he resigned as president of the UT-UDR in favour of Gaston Flosse. He subsequently retired from political life.
