= Alfred Poroi =

French Polynesian politician

Senator for French Polynesia
- In office 1962–1971
- Preceded by: Gérald Coppenrath
- Succeeded by: Pouvanaa a Oopa

Mayor of Papeete
- In office 1 September 1942 – 9 October 1966
- Preceded by: Léonce Brault
- Succeeded by: Georges Pambrun

Member of the French Polynesian Assembly for Windward Islands
- In office 3 November 1957 – 9 September 1972

Member of the French Polynesian Assembly for Papeete
- In office 1946 – 3 November 1957

Personal details
- Born: 3 March 1906 Mataiea, French Polynesia
- Died: 27 August 1984 (aged 78) Pirae, French Polynesia
- Party: Democratic and Socialist Union of the Resistance; Tahitian Union

Alfred Ernest Teraireia Poroi (3 March 1906—27 August 1994) was a French Polynesian politician who represented French Polynesia in the French Senate from 1962 to 1971.

Poroi was born in Mataiea on Tahiti and educated at l’école Viénot in Papeete. After working in the shipping industry, he was appointed manager of the Union Steam Ship Company of New Zealand's Papeete operations. In 1934 he was one of the founders of the Radio-Club Océanien, which ran the first radio station in Tahiti, and later served as its president. In 1946 he founded a travel agency, Travel Poroi.

In 1935 he was elected as a municipal councilor of Papeete. In 1941 when the council was dissolved and replaced by a commission he was appointed 1st deputy. In September 1942 he was appointed mayor following the resignation of Léonce Brault. He won the subsequent mayoral elections in August 1945 and was constantly re-elected until 1966.

He was first elected to the Assembly of French Polynesia in the 1945–46 French Oceanian legislative election. He was re-elected in the 1953 French Oceanian legislative election, with members of his Union for the Defence of the Interests of French Oceania coalition winning all five seats in Papeete. Following a dispute in the Assembly on 10 April 1953, a fight broke out between Poroi and Noël Ilari. Ilari then challenged Poroi to a duel, which Poroi agreed should take place at the end of the day. The duel ultimately did not occur, after Governor René Petitbon broadcast a radio message forbidding it and stationed police at the homes of the participants. He was re-elected in the 1957 election as a member of Rudy Bambridge's Tahitian Union. Following riots over income tax which overthrew the elected government of Pouvanaa a Oopa, he was appointed head of a new government by Governor Camille Victor Bailly.

In 1962 a split in the Tahitian Union saw Bambridge and Coppenrath depart. Poroi then contested Coppenrath's senate seat, winning election in the second round. In the subsequent 1962 Assembly elections he formed a coalition with the Democratic Rally of the Tahitian People.

In 1966 he lost the Papeete mayoralty to an anti-nuclear candidate, Georges Pambrun.

He was re-elected to the Assembly in the 1967 election.

He did not run for re-election to the Senate in 1971, and was succeeded by Pouvanaa a Oopa. He retired from politics in 1972.

== Honours ==
In 1952 he was awarded the Legion of Honour. He was also a Commander of the Ordre national du Mérite and Officer of the Ordre des Palmes académiques.
