= 1972 French Polynesian legislative election =

- 10 September 1972
- All 30 seats in the Territorial Assembly; 15 seats needed for a majority
Party	Leader	Vote %	Seats	+/–
UNR–UT	Gaston Flosse	22.75	8	+2
E'a Api	Francis Sanford	21.24	7	−2
Here Ai'a	Pouvanaa a Oopa	18.28	7	0
TAT–TT	Charles Taufa	11.74	3	New
UCT			1	New
UM–UNR			1	0
SISLV			1	New
THNRM			1	New
UTP			1	0
This lists parties that won seats. See the complete results below.

Legislative elections were held in French Polynesia on 10 September 1972 for the Territorial Assembly. Anti-autonomist parties won a majority.

== Results ==
Party	Votes	%	Seats	+/–
Tahoeraa Maohi UT–UNR	6,484	22.75	8	+2
E'a Api	6,055	21.24	7	–2
Here Ai'a	5,211	18.28	7	0
Te Au Tahoeraa–Tomite Taufa	3,341	11.72	3	New
Communal and Territorial Union	7,413	26.01	1	New
Marquesan Union–UNR	7,413	26.01	1	0
Safeguard the Leeward Islands	7,413	26.01	1	New
Tapura Huiraatira No Raro Matai	7,413	26.01	1	New
Union of Workers and Fishermen	7,413	26.01	1	0
Independence Party	7,413	26.01	0	New
Other parties	7,413	26.01	0	–
Total	28,504	100.00	30	0
Registered voters/turnout		63		
Source: Assembly, Henningham

=== Elected members ===
Constituency	Member	Party	Notes
Austral Islands	Pierre Hunter	Here Ai'a	Re-elected
Austral Islands	Tara Lenoir	Here Ai'a	
Leeward Islands	Roger Amiot	E'a Api	Re-elected
Leeward Islands	Adolphe Bohl	Here Ai'a	Re-elected
Leeward Islands	Philippe Brotherson	Here Ai'a	
Leeward Islands	Tetuanui Ehu	Tahoeraa Maohi UT–UNR	Re-elected
Leeward Islands	Marcel Hart	Safeguard the Leeward Islands	Re-elected
Leeward Islands	Toro Teriirere	Tapura Huiraatira No Raro Matai	Re-elected (previously UTD)
Marquesas Islands	Guy Rauzy	E'a Api	Re-elected
Marquesas Islands	André Teikitutoua	Marquesan Union–UNR	Re-elected
Tuamotu–Gambier Islands	Calixte Jouette	Tahoeraa Maohi UT–UNR	Re-elected
Tuamotu–Gambier Islands	Riquet Marere	Tahoeraa Maohi UT–UNR	Re-elected
Tuamotu–Gambier Islands	Louis Palmer	E'a Api	
Tuamotu–Gambier Islands	André Porlier	Union of Workers and Fishermen	Re-elected
Windward Islands	Henri Bouvier	Here Ai'a	Re-elected
Windward Islands	Anthelme Buillard	E'a Api	
Windward Islands	Gaston Flosse	Tahoeraa Maohi UT–UNR	Re-elected
Windward Islands	Michel Law	Te Au Tahoeraa–Tomite Taufa	
Windward Islands	Tuianu Le Gayic	Tahoeraa Maohi UT–UNR	
Windward Islands	Coco Lehartel	Tahoeraa Maohi UT–UNR	
Windward Islands	André Lorfevre	E'a Api	
Windward Islands	Daniel Millaud	E'a Api	Re-elected
Windward Islands	Pouvanaa a Oopa	Here Ai'a	
Windward Islands	Nedo Salmon	Tahoeraa Maohi UT–UNR	Re-elected
Windward Islands	Tutaha Salmon	Communal and Territorial Union	
Windward Islands	Francis Sanford	E'a Api	Re-elected
Windward Islands	Charles Taufa	Te Au Tahoeraa–Tomite Taufa	Re-elected (previously Tahoeraa Ui No Polynesia)
Windward Islands	John Teariki	Here Ai'a	Re-elected
Windward Islands	Jacques Teuira	Tahoeraa Maohi UT–UNR	Re-elected
Windward Islands	Frantz Vanizette	Te Au Tahoeraa–Tomite Taufa	Re-elected (previously Independents of Economic and Social Action)
Source: Assembly of French Polynesia

== Aftermath ==
Louis Palmer died in February 1973 and was replaced by Lucien Ratinassamy. Pouvanaa a Oopa resigned during the term of the Territorial Assembly and was replaced by Yannick Amaru. André Teikitutoua died shortly before the 1977 elections and was not replaced.
