= Frantz Vanizette =

French Polynesian politician

President of the Assembly of French Polynesia
- In office 29 May 1981 – 1 June 1982
- Preceded by: John Teariki
- Succeeded by: Émile Vernaudon
- In office 29 May 1979 – 30 May 1980
- Preceded by: John Teariki
- Succeeded by: John Teariki
- In office 7 June 1977 – 28 April 1978
- Preceded by: Gaston Flosse
- Succeeded by: John Teariki
- In office 5 June 1974 – 10 June 1976
- Preceded by: Gaston Flosse
- Succeeded by: Gaston Flosse
- In office 2 March 1961 – 6 November 1962
- Preceded by: Jacques Tauraa
- Succeeded by: Jacques Tauraa

Member of the French Polynesian Assembly for Windward Isles
- In office 3 November 1957 – 31 May 1982

Personal details
- Born: 25 February 1927 Montendre, Charente-Maritime, France
- Died: 5 November 2001 (aged 74) Pirae, French Polynesia
- Party: Independent; Tahitian Democratic Union; Te Au Tahoeraa–Tomite Taufa

Frantz Vanizette (25 February 1927 — 5 November 2001) was a French Polynesian politician who served five times as president of the Assembly of French Polynesia.

Vanizette was born in Montendre in the Charente-Maritime department of France. After serving in the French Navy he moved to Tahiti where he worked as a secretary at the Chamber of Agriculture and married a sister of politician Jean-Baptiste Céran-Jérusalémy. In 1952 he became general secretary of the Polynesian Federation of Trade unions (CFTC) and became head of the social insurance fund (CPF).

He was first elected to the Assembly of French Polynesia as an independent in the 1957 French Polynesian legislative election. He opposed the government of Pouvanaa a Oopa, and advocated for its removal following the French riots against it. He subsequently joined the Tahitian Democratic Union, and was re-elected on its ticket in the 1962 elections. He was re-elected as an independent at the 1967 election. In the leadup to the 1972 election he was a founder of the Te Au Tahoeraa–Tomite Taufa, which promoted limited autonomy within France. He was re-elected.

In June 1975 he was re-elected as President of the Assembly after forming a new majority with the backing of pro-autonomy parties. In November 1975 the majority shifted again to favour the anti-autonomy Gaullist faction headed by Gaston Flosse. When Flosse was in Paris, he called a meeting of the Assembly in the middle of the night to reject the government's proposal for increased integration with France and to call for new elections. When the French government refused, pro-autonomy MPs and their supporters occupied the Assembly building, while Flosse's supporters formed their own Assembly and elected him president.

At the 1977 election Vanizette ran as part of the pro-autonomy United Front, which won a majority. He was elected president of the Assembly and re-elected twice more in the next five years, alternating with John Teariki. In 1981 he formed the Social Democratic Party with Maco Tevane, with which he contested the 1982 election. After failing to be re-elected he retired from political life.

He died at Jean-Prince Hospital in Pirae in November 2001.
