= 1982 French Polynesian legislative election =

- 23 May 1982
- All 30 seats in the Territorial Assembly; 15 seats needed for a majority
Party	Leader	Vote %	Seats	+/–
Tahoera'a Huiraatira	Gaston Flosse	29.56	13	+3
Here Ai'a	Francis Sanford	15.70	6	
Aia Api		11.35	3	New
Ia Mana te Nunaa		10.84	3	New
E'a Api		6.27	1	
Taatira Polynesia		4.81	1	+1
Marquesan Union			1	New
Paruru ia Raro Matai			1	New
Porinesia no Ananahi			1	New
This lists parties that won seats. See the complete results below.

Legislative elections were held in French Polynesia on 23 May 1982 for the Territorial Assembly. Following the elections, a government was formed by Tahoera'a Huiraatira and Aia Api, who had won 16 of the 30 seats in the Assembly.

== Campaign ==
A total of 398 candidates contested the elections representing around 30 parties and lists, of which fewer than 20 were women.

== Results ==
Party	Votes	%	Seats	+/–
Tahoera'a Huiraatira	17,787	29.56	13	+3
Here Ai'a	9,451	15.70	6	–
Aia Api	6,829	11.35	3	New
Ia Mana te Nunaa	6,522	10.84	3	New
E'a Api	3,773	6.27	1	–
Taatira Polynesia	2,894	4.81	1	0
Marquesan Union	12,926	21.48	1	New
Paruru ia Raro Matai	12,926	21.48	1	New
Porinesia no Ananahi	12,926	21.48	1	New
Social Democrats	12,926	21.48	0	New
Other parties	12,926	21.48	0	–
Total	60,182	100.00	30	0
Registered voters/turnout	84,710	–		
Source: Assembly, Henningham

=== Elected members ===
Constituency	Member	Party	Notes
Austral Islands	Pierre Hunter	Here Ai'a	Re-elected
Austral Islands	Jacques Teheiura	Tahoera'a Huiraatira	Re-elected
Leeward Islands	Peni Atger	Ia Mana	
Leeward Islands	Philippe Brotherson	Here Ai'a	Re-elected
Leeward Islands	Marcel Hart	Paruru ia Raro Matai	Re-elected (previously TH)
Leeward Islands	Pierre Lehartel	Tahoera'a Huiraatira	
Leeward Islands	Pupure Maiarii	Tahoera'a Huiraatira	Re-elected
Leeward Islands	André Roihau	Tahoera'a Huiraatira	
Leeward Islands	Ioane Temauri	Tahoera'a Huiraatira	
Leeward Islands	Toro Teriirere	Here Ai'a	Re-elected
Marquesas Islands	René Kohumoetini	Tahoera'a Huiraatira	
Marquesas Islands	Guy Rauzy	Marquesan Union	Re-elected (previously E'a Api)
Tuamotu–Gambier Islands	Riquet Marere	Tahoera'a Huiraatira	Re-elected
Tuamotu–Gambier Islands	Napoléon Spitz	Aia Api	
Windward Islands	Arthur Chung	Taatira Polynesia	Re-elected
Windward Islands	Jacqui Drollet	Ia Mana	
Windward Islands	Milou Ebb	Here Ai'a	Re-elected
Windward Islands	Gaston Flosse	Tahoera'a Huiraatira	Re-elected
Windward Islands	Jacquie Graffe	Porinesia no Ananahi	
Windward Islands	Jean Juventin	Here Ai'a	Re-elected
Windward Islands	Tuianu Le Gayic	Tahoera'a Huiraatira	Re-elected
Windward Islands	Alexandre Léontieff	Tahoera'a Huiraatira	Re-elected
Windward Islands	Sylvain Millaud	Aia Api	
Windward Islands	Tutaha Salmon	Tahoera'a Huiraatira	
Windward Islands	Francis Sanford	E'a Api	Re-elected
Windward Islands	John Teariki	Here Ai'a	Re-elected
Windward Islands	Charles Tetaria	Tahoera'a Huiraatira	
Windward Islands	Jacques Teuira	Tahoera'a Huiraatira	Re-elected
Windward Islands	Jacky Van Bastolaer	Ia Mana	
Windward Islands	Emile Vernaudon	Aia Api	
Source: Assembly of French Polynesia

== Aftermath ==
Following the elections, the Assembly elected members of the Government Council.

Position	Member
Vice-President	Gaston Flosse
Minister of Agriculture and Livestock	Sylvain Millaud
Minister of Economy, Finance, Tourism and Sea	Alexandre Léontieff
Minister of Education and Culture	Jacques Teheiura
Minister of Health and Social Affairs	Charles Tetaria
Minister of Youth, Sport, Public Education	Terii Sanford
Minister of Planning and Energy	Boris Léontieff

As members of the Government Council could not serve in the Assembly, several new members entered the Assembly as replacements: Ernest Teinauri of Tahoera'a Huiraatira replaced Jacques Teheiura; Franklin Brotherson, Roger Doom and Albert Taruoura of Tahoera'a Huiraatira replaced Gaston Flosse, Alexandre Léontieff and Charles Tetaria, while Terii Sanford of Aia Api replaced Sylvain Millaud. Sanford was also later elected the council and replaced by Yves Thunot.

John Teariki died in 1983, he was replaced by Jean-Baptiste Trouillet.
