= Jacques Drollet =

French Polynesian politician and educator (1923–2015)

Jacques Drollet

Jacques Denis Drollet (6 December 1923 – 5 December 2015) was a French Polynesian politician and educator. He served two five-year terms in the Assembly of French Polynesia, as a member of the Rassemblement démocratique des populations tahitiennes (RDPT).

== Early life and political career ==
Drollet has been variously described as having joined the Free French Navy when he was 17, serving in an informal French/American "liaison" unit during the Solomon Islands campaign, and on the Triomphant, where he assisted in the evacuation of Nauru, and as having joined the American army at 18 because he could not join the French forces. After the end of the Second World War, Drollet attended normal school in Toulouse, and then returned to French Polynesia where he worked as a schoolteacher.

Drollet joined the teachers' union, where he soon became a leader. In 1956, he joined the Rassemblement démocratique des populations tahitiennes (RDPT), and was elected to the Assembly of French Polynesia in November 1957. There, he served as chief of staff for Minister of Education Walter Grand. During the unrest in the aftermath of the 1958 independence referendum, Drollet tried, but failed, to convince pro-independence leader Pouvanaa a Oopa to leave Papeete. After Pouvanaa was arrested, Drollet introduced a resolution in the Assembly stating that Polynesia would always be part of France; (Note: "que la Polynésie restât à jamais partie intégrante de la République française") however, he also spoke out in support of Pouvanaa, (Note: "Lorsqu'après la condamnation de Pouvana'a a O'opa sur une accusation fausse (le cocktail Molotov censé incendier la ville avait été envoyé par-dessus un mur par un employé de la mairie et aussitôt récupéré de l'autre côté du mur par un autre employé de la même mairie), j'ai été le seul universitaire français, en collaboration avec Jacques Drollet, à multiplier les démarches pour le faire libérer en arguant des faux témoignages évidents") and in 1962 introduced a resolution asking that the Assembly intervene on Pouvanaa's behalf. After Charles de Gaulle banned the RDPT in 1964, Drollet did not join its successor party Here Ai'a, and did not run for office in the 1967 election.

=== Nuclear testing ===
In June 1962, Drollet told the Territorial Assembly that media sources were speculating about the possibility of nuclear testing within French Polynesian territory. Jacques Foccart denied that this would happen; regardless, in January 1963, the Assembly sent a delegation of 6 parliamentarians, including Drollet, to France, where they had an audience with Charles de Gaulle. De Gaulle proposed to them that the Centre d'Expérimentations Nucléaires du Pacifique (CEP), a weapons research facility, be constructed in French Polynesia, arguing that it would be economically beneficial. While the delegation was in Paris, the French military began construction of the CEP on the atolls of Moruroa and Fangataufa, without notifying the Territorial Assembly.

Drollet returned to Paris in late 1964 to discuss French Polynesian finances, and to negotiate the price that France would pay for the use of the atolls. During this visit, he had a private meeting with de Gaulle, after which he proposed that the atolls be given to France in perpetuity, free of charge. He initially claimed that de Gaulle had appealed to his patriotism; however, in 2005, he testified before a public inquiry held by the Territorial Assembly, and said that de Gaulle had threatened to declare all of French Polynesia a "strategic military territory" (Note: "Territoire stratégique militaire") and impose a military government.

On 6 February 1964, Drollet chaired the meeting of the Assembly's permanent commission at which the proposal to give the atolls to France was approved, by a vote of 3–0 with 2 abstentions. He later said that he hoped France would never forget what Polynesia had done. (Note: "en espérant que jamais la France n'oublierait le service que nous le rendions sur ce plan (...) en espérant que la France ne nous oublierait pas.") In September 1966, de Gaulle invited Drollet to be present at the Bételgeuse test.

== Later life and legacy ==
Drollet spent 15 years as the director of the Territorial Education Service ("Service de l'Education Territorial"). In this role, he pioneered the use of Tahitian as a language of instruction, and in 1965, he established French Polynesia's first kindergarten ("école maternelle").

In 1972, in collaboration with Yoshihiko Sinoto, and at the encouragement of Marlon Brando, Drollet "establish[ed] an archaeological field school" for the exploration of sites on Teti'aroa, which Brando had recently purchased. As well, he served as the administrator of the Austral Islands for three years, and as chairman of the board of directors of the Office of Tourism. He was a co-founder of the airline Air Polynésie; in 1985, when Air Polynésie acquired the former Air Tahiti and took the subsidiary's name, he was one of only two Polynesians on the company's board of directors. He also co-founded the Socredo bank.

== Personal life ==
Drollet was the father of Dag Drollet, who was romantically involved with Cheyenne Brando, daughter of Marlon Brando—and who in 1990 was killed by Christian Brando, Marlon Brando's son. In the aftermath of Christian Brando's conviction for manslaughter, Drollet threatened to have Marlon Brando arrested if he ever returned to French Polynesia. He was also the uncle of French Polynesian politician Jacqui Drollet.

Drollet's brother-in-law was Jacques Tauraa.

== Recognition ==
Drollet was an Officer of the Legion of Honour, a Commander of the Ordre des Palmes académiques, and a Commander of the Order of Tahiti Nui.

French Polynesian author Chantal Spitz's 1991 novel L'Île des rêves écrasés, about the beginning of nuclear testing in French Polynesia, includes a corrupt politician named "John Prallet", who voluntarily offers the (fictional) islet of Ruahine to France. Literary scholar Anaïs Maurer has called Prallet a "faintly veiled caricature" of Drollet.
