= Noël Ilari =

French soldier (1897–1985)

President of the Assembly of French Polynesia
- In office 18 October 1953 – 10 June 1955
- Preceded by: Jean-Baptiste Céran-Jérusalémy
- Succeeded by: Walter Grand

Member of the French Polynesian Assembly for Tubuai, Raivavae, Rapa
- In office 18 January 1953 – 3 November 1957

Personal details
- Born: 11 September 1897 Rennes, France
- Died: 2 February 1985 Tubuai, French Polynesia
- Party: Democratic Rally of the Tahitian People

Noël Ilari (11 September 1897—2 February 1985) was a French soldier who fought in both world wars. He served as president of the Assembly of French Polynesia from 1953 to 1955.

== Biography ==
Ilari was born in Rennes in France. He fought in the First World War, which he finished at the rank of second lieutenant. He arrived in French Polynesia in 1934, where he came into conflict with the local authorities because of his challenge to commercial monopolies. When war was declared in 1939, as a reserve captain, he asked and obtained from Governor Frédéric Chastenet de Géry permission to go to France at his own expense to fight and thus took part in the French campaign in June 1940. Accusing General de Gaulle of wanting to divide the French, he joined Vichy and held positions within the Ministry of Sports and Youth. In charge of the mission in Polynesia, he was refused entry to the territory by Émile de Curton, the governor appointed by de Gaulle. He continued his mission in Indochina under the orders of Admiral Jean Decoux until the end of the war.

He returned to France in 1946, and then to Polynesia where in 1947 he was accused of a plot in association with Pouvanaa a Oopa. After being imprisoned for several months, he was acquitted, but banned from staying in Tahiti. He moved to Tubuai in the Austral Islands, and became a farmer and teacher, living on a property of 120 hectares which he called "Ermitage Sainte-Hélène". He was elected to the Assembly of French Polynesia in the 1953 French Oceanian legislative election on the ticket of Oopa's Democratic Rally of the Tahitian People, and was elected vice-president of the Assembly. Following a dispute in the Assembly on 10 April, a fight broke out between Ilari and Alfred Poroi. Ilari then challenged Poroi to a duel, which Poroi agreed should take place at the end of the day. The duel ultimately did not occur, after Governor René Petitbon broadcast a radio message forbidding it and stationed police at the homes of the participants. In October 1953 he left the RDPT and joined the opposition, and was elected president of the Assembly. Walter Grand, a former Free Frenchman, succeeded him in June 1955. He lost his seat in the 1957 election.

In 1964 he published a memoir, Secrets tahitiens. Journal d'un popaa farani.

He died and was buried on his property in 1985.
