= Céline Oopa =

French Polynesian politician

Member of the Territorial Assembly
- In office 1961–1967
- Constituency: Leeward Islands

Céline Oopa was a French Polynesian politician. She was elected to the Territorial Assembly in 1961, becoming its first female member.

== Biography ==
Oopa's husband Tautu was elected to the Territorial Assembly in 1953 and was re-elected in 1957. After his death in 1961, Céline contested the by-election on 8 October and was elected to the Assembly, becoming its first female member. She was re-elected in 1962 as a member of the Democratic Rally of the Tahitian People (RDPT). When the RDPT was dissolved in 1963, she was prevented from joining its successor, Here Ai'a. She remained a member of the Assembly until the 1967 elections.
