= Martial Iorss =

French Polynesian politician

Member of the Territorial Assembly for Papeete
- In office 1953–1957

Personal details
- Born: 12 January 1891; Taiohae, Nuku Hiva, French Polynesia
- Died: 7 May 1966 (aged 75); Papeete, French Polynesia

Martial Iorss (12 January 1891 – 7 May 1966) was a French Polynesian politician. He served as a member of the Territorial Assembly between 1953 and 1957.

== Biography ==
Iorss was born Taiohae in 1891. He studied in Papeete and worked as a teacher in Mataiea for two years, before moving into commerce. After four years of military service during World War I he returned to commerce. In 1929 he was appointed Chief Clerk in the court system, a role he held until 1940. He was president of the Racing Society between 1929 and 1933 and the Yacht Club from 1932 until 1940 and also headed the Society of Tahitian Youth.

Iorss was elected to the Territorial Assembly in the Papeete constituency in the 1953 elections as a representative of the Democratic and Socialist Union of the Resistance. He served until 1957.

In 1961 he published a book on Tahitian grammar. He died in May 1966 at his home in the Paofai area of Papeete.
