= 1962 French Polynesian legislative election =

- 14 November 1962
- All 30 seats in the Territorial Assembly; 15 seats needed for a majority
Party	Leader	Vote %	Seats	+/–
RDPT	Jacques Tauraa	32.90	14	−3
Tahitian Union	Rudy Bambridge	19.00	8	−1
Tahitian Democratic Union	Alfred Poroi	17.66	5	New
Biens des Tuamotu Gambier			1	New
Pupu Tiama Maohi			1	New
Voice of the People			1	New
This lists parties that won seats. See the complete results below.

Legislative elections were held in French Polynesia on 14 October 1962 for the Territorial Assembly. The Democratic Rally of the Tahitian People remained the largest party, but lost its majority in the Assembly, winning 14 of the 30 seats.

== Results ==
Party	Votes	%	Seats	+/–
Democratic Rally of the Tahitian People	7,839	32.90	14	–3
Tahitian Union	4,527	19.00	8	–1
Tahitian Democratic Union	4,207	17.66	5	New
Biens des Tuamotu Gambier	7,252	30.44	1	New
Pupu Tiama Maohi	7,252	30.44	1	New
Voice of the People	7,252	30.44	1	New
Others	7,252	30.44	0	–
Total	23,825	100.00	30	0
Source: PIM, Henningham

=== Elected members ===
Constituency	Member	Party	Notes
Austral Islands	Matani Mooroa	Democratic Rally of the Tahitian People	Re-elected
Austral Islands	Mauri Tahuhuterani	Democratic Rally of the Tahitian People	Re-elected
Leeward Islands	Gaston Deane	Democratic Rally of the Tahitian People	Re-elected
Leeward Islands	Tetuanui Ehu	Tahitian Union	Elected
Leeward Islands	Marcel Hart	Tahitian Democratic Union	Elected
Leeward Islands	Céline Oopa	Democratic Rally of the Tahitian People	Re-elected
Leeward Islands	Pita Oopa	Democratic Rally of the Tahitian People	Elected
Leeward Islands	Félix Tefaatau	Democratic Rally of the Tahitian People	Elected
Marquesas Islands	William Grelet	Tahitian Union	Re-elected (formerly UDSR)
Marquesas Islands	Hopuetaitetuai Raihauti	Democratic Rally of the Tahitian People	Elected
Tuamotu and Gambier Islands	Pierre Colombani	Biens des Tuamotu Gambier	Elected
Tuamotu and Gambier Islands	Paul Deane	Democratic Rally of the Tahitian People	Elected
Tuamotu and Gambier Islands	Calixte Jouette	Tahitian Union	Re-elected
Tuamotu and Gambier Islands	Riquet Marere	Tahitian Union	Elected
Windward Islands	Rudy Bambridge	Tahitian Union	Re-elected
Windward Islands	Jean-Baptiste Céran-Jérusalémy	Pupu Tiama Maohi	Re-elected (previously RDPT)
Windward Islands	Gérald Coppenrath	Tahitian Union	Re-elected
Windward Islands	William Coppenrath	Democratic Rally of the Tahitian People	Elected
Windward Islands	Jacques Drollet	Democratic Rally of the Tahitian People	Re-elected
Windward Islands	Georges Leboucher	Tahitian Union	Re-elected
Windward Islands	Alexandre Le Gayic	Tahitian Democratic Union	Elected
Windward Islands	Charles Lehartel	Democratic Rally of the Tahitian People	Re-elected
Windward Islands	Teivitau Pito	Voice of the People	Elected
Windward Islands	Alfred Poroi	Tahitian Democratic Union	Re-elected (previously UT)
Windward Islands	Rosa Raoulx	Tahitian Democratic Union	Elected
Windward Islands	Nedo Salmon	Tahitian Union	Re-elected
Windward Islands	Jean Salmon	Democratic Rally of the Tahitian People	Elected
Windward Islands	Jacques Tauraa	Democratic Rally of the Tahitian People	Re-elected
Windward Islands	John Teariki	Democratic Rally of the Tahitian People	Re-elected
Windward Islands	Frantz Vanizette	Tahitian Democratic Union	Re-elected (previously independent)
Source: Assembly of French Polynesia

== Aftermath ==
In the new Council of Government, the Democratic Rally of the Tahitian People had three ministers and the Tahitian Democratic Union two.
