= Émile Vernaudon =

French Polynesian politician

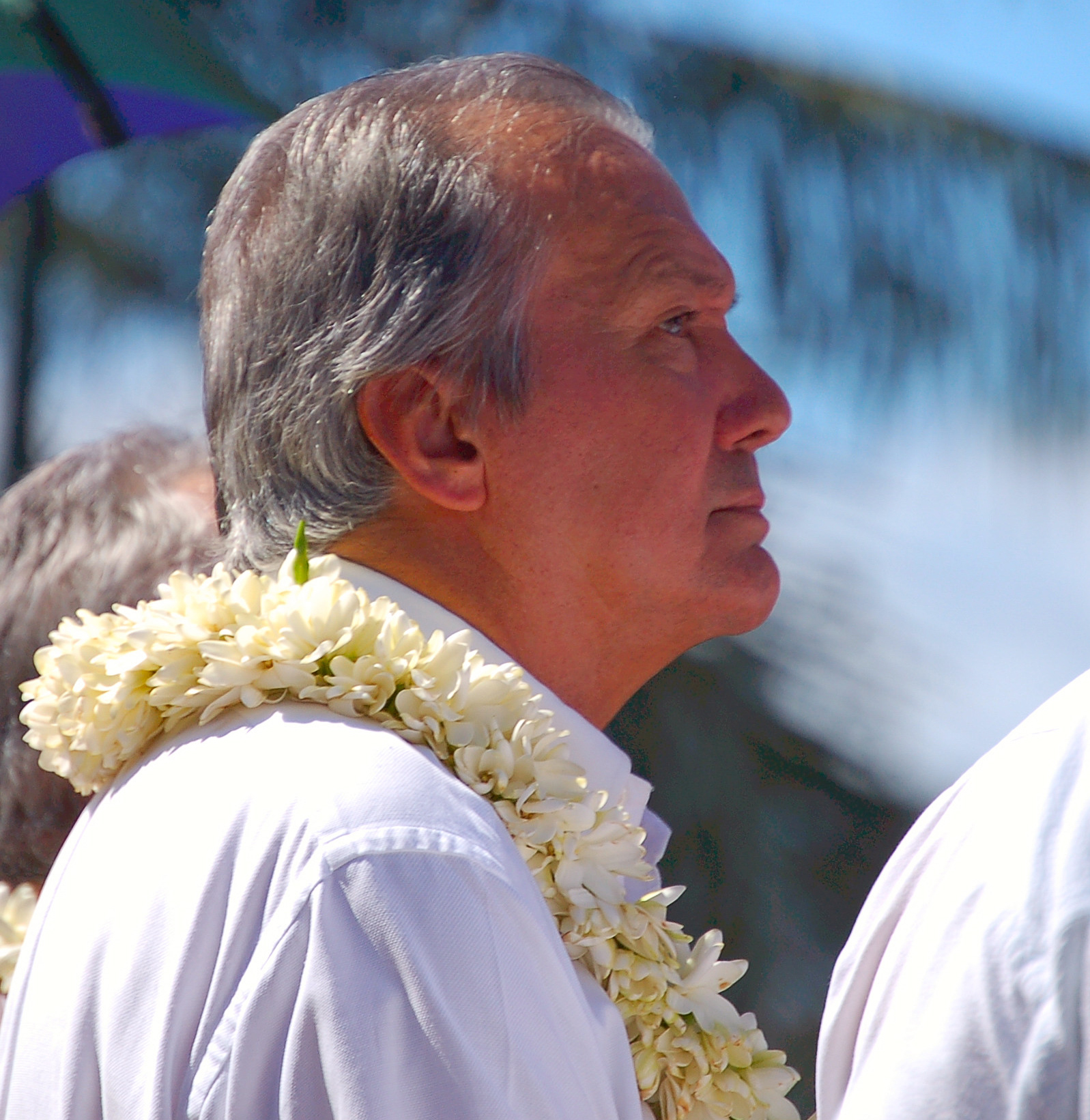
- Vernaudon in 2006

Mayor of Mahina
- In office 1977–2008

Minister of Posts and Telecommunications
- In office 2005 – 12 April 2006
- President: Oscar Temaru

President of the Assembly of French Polynesia
- In office 28 March 1991 – 2 April 1992
- Preceded by: Jean Juventin
- Succeeded by: Jean Juventin
- In office 1 June 1982 – 5 April 1983
- Preceded by: Frantz Vanizette
- Succeeded by: Jacques Teuira

Member of the French Polynesian Assembly for Windward islands
- In office 23 May 2004 – 28 January 2008
- In office 12 May 1996 – 5 May 2001
- In office 16 March 1986 – 1 April 1992
- In office 23 May 1982 – 4 April 1983

Member of the French National Assembly for French Polynesia's 2nd constituency
- In office 1997–2002
- Preceded by: Gaston Flosse
- Succeeded by: Beatrice Vernaudon
- In office 1988–1993
- Succeeded by: Gaston Flosse

Personal details
- Born: 8 December 1943 (age 82) Papeete, French Polynesia
- Party: E'a Api; Aia Api

Émile André Vernaudon (born 8 December 1943) is a former French Polynesian politician and Cabinet Minister. The leader of the Aia Api party, he served as President of the Assembly of French Polynesia twice, first from 1981 to 1983, and the second time from 1991 to 1992. He served as Minister of Posts and Telecommunications in the Cabinet of Oscar Temaru. He represented French Polynesia's 2nd constituency in the French National Assembly twice, from 1988 to 1993, and again from 1997 to 2002. From 1977 to 2008 he served as Mayor of Mahina.

In 2007 he was convicted on the first of a long series of corruption charges stemming from his time as mayor of Mahina and as Minister of Posts and Telecommunications. After serving time in jail, he retired from politics in 2011.

== Political career ==
A surveyor by profession, Vernaudon became mayor of Mahina in 1977. As mayor, he became known as "Sheriff" after dressing the police in Mahina in American police uniforms. At the 1982 French Polynesian legislative election he founded the Aia Api party, which went on to win three seats. Aia Api subsequently formed a coalition with Gaston Flosse's Tahoeraa Huiraatira, and Vernaudon was elected President of the Assembly. The coalition collapsed in September 1982, after Vernaudon contested the by-election for the French National Assembly against Flosse's candidate. He lost the Assembly presidency and his seat in the Assembly in April 1983.

He was re-elected to the Assembly at the 1986 election. He was re-elected again in the 1991 election, again forming a coalition with Flosse and again becoming President of the Assembly. Once again the coalition collapsed within a few months, and Vernaudon used his position as Assembly President to shut down the legislature, locking MPs out of the Assembly until his term expired in April 1992. He was re-elected to the Assembly at the 1996 election He lost his seat at the 2001 election.

He contested the 1988 French legislative election in French Polynesia's 2nd constituency as an independent and was elected to the French National Assembly. He lost his seat at the 1993 French legislative election, but regained it in 1997. He lost the seat again in 2002.

He was re-elected to the Assembly at the 2004 election. Between 2005 and 2006, he served as Minister of Posts and Telecommunications in the government of Oscar Temaru. In September 2004 he was convicted of illegal profit-taking, fined USD30,000 and given a suspended sentence of 12 months imprisonment for diverting public resources to benefit his family and girlfriend. The sentence was upheld on appeal in January 2006. The court did not declare him ineligible for public office, and Temaru allowed him to retain his ministerial positions. He resigned as a Minister in April 2006. Following his resignation he aligned himself with Tahoeraa Huiraatira and announced his intention to replace Temaru as president.

== Corruption convictions ==
In March 2007 he was convicted of corruption in the Tautira land affair, given an 18 month suspended prison sentence, and declared ineligible for public office for five years. The sentence was upheld on appeal in April 2008.

On 4 December 2007 Vernaudon was remanded in custody on corruption charges relating to his management of the Office of Posts and Telecommunications. As a result of his detention he was unable to campaign in the 2008 territorial elections, and his place on the To Tatou Ai'a was taken by his partner Heifara Izal. He was able to run in the municipal elections in February 2008 and was re-elected as Mayor. He was released on bail on 2 April 2008. In December 2008 the French court of cassation upheld his sentence of ineligibility in the Tautira case, and he was removed from office as mayor.

In January 2011 he was convicted of concealment and complicity in embezzlement of public funds, complicity in forgery and use of forgery, and illegal taking of interests in the OPT case, and sentenced to five years in prison and five years of ineligibility for public office. The following month, during the second round of the Mahina by-election, the list he led came third, winning 23.2% of the votes cast. At the end of May 2011, still in prison, he resigned from his post as municipal councilor and left politics. He was granted conditional release on 6 June 2012.

In February 2016 he was tried for corruption over the award of the contract for the Honotua communications cable, and acquitted. In December 2016 he was convicted of corruption again and sentenced to another year in prison for giving a contract for Mahina's green waste to a friend. He was convicted again of forgery, use of forgery, breach of trust and embezzlement of public funds over the running of Radio Bleue, a public radio station. He was sentenced to a year in prison, a 5 million XPF fine, and five years of ineligibility for public office.

In April 2018 he joined the Tahoeraa Huiraatira to contest the 2018 election. He was subsequently removed from the electoral lists as he was unable to vote and ineligible for public office.

== Honours ==
In 2000 he was made a member of the Ordre national du Mérite. He was stripped of his membership in October 2011.
