= 1953 French Oceanian legislative election =

| ← 1945-46 | 18 January 1953 | 1957 → |
- All 30 seats in the Territorial Assembly; 15 seats needed for a majority
| Party | Leader | Vote % | Seats |
|---|---|---|---|
| RDPT | Pouvanaa a Oopa | 51.88 | 18 |
| UDSR–RPF | | 35.66 | 7 |
This lists parties that won seats. See the complete results below.

Legislative elections were held in French Oceania on 18 January 1953, the first to the new Territorial Assembly, which replaced the Representative Assembly.

== Results ==
The result was a victory for the Democratic Rally of the Tahitian People (RDPT) led by Pouvanaa a Oopa, which won 18 of the 25 seats. The Democratic and Socialist Union of the Resistance won five seats and the Rally of the French People two; the two parties had run together as the Union for the Defence of the Interests of French Oceania (UDIOF).

Oopa failed to win a seat in Papeete, and subsequently stated that he would complain about election fraud to the French government. Governor René Petitbon organised an official enquiry, which concluded that the allegations were unfounded.

| Party or alliance | | Votes | % | Seats |
|---|---|---|---|---|
| Democratic Rally of the Tahitian People | | 15,062 | 51.88 | 18 |
| Union for the Defence of the Interests of French Oceania | UDSR | 10,353 | 35.66 | 5 |
| Union for the Defence of the Interests of French Oceania | RPF | 10,353 | 35.66 | 2 |
| Independents | | 3,615 | 12.45 | 0 |
| Total | | 29,030 | 100.00 | 25 |
Source: Pacific Islands Monthly

=== By constituency ===
| Constituency | Elected members | Party |
|---|---|---|
| Bora Bora, Maupiti | Pierre Hunter | Democratic Rally of the Tahitian People |
| East Tahiti | Paul Bouzer | Democratic Rally of the Tahitian People |
| East Tahiti | Amaru Terii Tepa | Democratic Rally of the Tahitian People |
| Gambier and Tuamotu Islands | Calixte Jouette | Democratic Rally of the Tahitian People |
| Huahine | Tautu Oopa | Democratic Rally of the Tahitian People |
| Northern Marquesas | Raymond Gendron | |
| Papeete | Walter Grand | Rally of the French People |
| Papeete | Albert Leboucher | Democratic and Socialist Union of the Resistance |
| Papeete | Martial Iorss | Democratic and Socialist Union of the Resistance |
| Papeete | Alfred Poroi | Democratic and Socialist Union of the Resistance |
| Papeete | Franck Richmond | Rally of the French People |
| Peninsula, Moorea, Maiao, Makatea | Charles Lehartel | Democratic Rally of the Tahitian People |
| Peninsula, Moorea, Maiao, Makatea | John Teariki | Democratic Rally of the Tahitian People |
| Raiatea (less Uturoa) | Gaston Deane | Democratic Rally of the Tahitian People |
| Rurutu, Rimatara | Matani Mooroa | Democratic Rally of the Tahitian People |
| South Marquesas | Henri Frebault | Democratic Rally of the Tahitian People |
| Tahaa | Ariiura Maraea | Democratic Rally of the Tahitian People |
| Tuamotu Centre | Henri Aumeran | Democratic Rally of the Tahitian People |
| Tuamotu East | Ropa Colombel | Democratic Rally of the Tahitian People |
| Tuamotu West | Jean Alexandre | Democratic Rally of the Tahitian People |
| Tubuai, Raivavae, Rapa | Noël Ilari | Democratic Rally of the Tahitian People |
| Uturoa | Marcel Tixier | |
| West Tahiti | Pierre Garbutt | Democratic Rally of the Tahitian People |
| West Tahiti | René-Raphaël Lagarde | Democratic Rally of the Tahitian People |
Source: Assembly of French Polynesia

== Aftermath ==
Following the elections, the Assembly convened for the first time on 14 March. Jean-Baptiste Céran-Jérusalémy, a member of the RDPT, was elected President of the Assembly two days later.

Following a dispute in the Assembly on 10 April, a fight broke out between Noël Ilari and Alfred Poroi. Ilari then challenged Poroi to a duel, which Poroi agreed should take place at the end of the day. However, the Governor broadcast a radio message, banning it from taking place and stationing police at the homes of the two.
