= Charles Vernier =

French Polynesian politician

Member of the French National Assembly for French Polynesia
- In office 21 October 1945 – 10 June 1946
- Preceded by: none (constituency established)
- Succeeded by: Georges Ahnne

Personal details
- Born: 27 June 1883 Papeete, French Polynesia
- Died: 12 June 1966 (aged 82) Romans-sur-Isère, France
- Party: Democratic and Socialist Union of the Resistance

Charles Henri Vernier (27 June 1883 — 12 June 1966) was a French Polynesian religious leader, academic, and politician. He led the Maohi Protestant Church for 40 years from 1911 to 1951, and was the first elected representative of French Polynesia to the French legislature.

Vernier was the son of Pastor Frederic Vernier, a missionary of the Maohi Protestant Church. He was educated at Montauban in France, where he studied theology, and in Edinburgh. After serving as a pastor in Annonay he returned to French Polynesia, where he worked as a pastor in the Leeward Islands from 1912 to 1923. While there, he studied the Tahitian language, and joined the Society of Oceanists. In 1925 he returned to Papeete, where he was a leading figure in the Maohi Protestant Church. In 1936, he chaired the Superior Council of the Evangelical Church (or Synod). In 1937 he became manager of the pastoral school of Tahiti. He also published a number of works on the Tahitian Language, including an elementary school grammar.

In 1940 he joined other protestant leaders to rally French Polynesia to support Charles de Gaulle. A supporter of Free France, two of his sons died fighting in France in 1944 and 1945. He left for France in June 1945, and while there was asked to serve as delegate for French Polynesia to the constituent assembly which had been tasked with drafting a constitution for a Fourth French Republic. He was formally elected to the role in the 1945 French legislative election, winning 85% of the vote. In the Assembly he sat with the Democratic and Socialist Union of the Resistance group. He did not stand in the June 1946 French legislative election, and was replaced by Georges Ahnne.

After working as chair of Tahitian language at the Institut national des langues et civilisations orientales, Vernier returned to Tahiti in 1948. Following the death of Georges Ahnne he contested the 1949 French Oceania by-election, but lost to Pouvanaa a Oopa. In September 1950 he was made a Chevalier of the Legion of Honor. He retired to France in 1951.

== Bibliography ==
- Introduction à la langue tahitienne . Grammar, usual vocabulary, conversation, Besson & Chantemerle, Paris, 1934. 163 p. Expanded edition in 1959.
- Charles Vernier and Alexandre Drollet, Grammaire de la langue tahitienne Maison des Missions, Paris, 1934.
- Tahitiens d’autrefois, Tahitiens d’aujourd’hui, Society of Evangelical Missions, Paris, 1934.
- Tahitiens d’hier et d’aujourd’hui, Society of Evangelical Missions, Paris, 1948.
- "Les Variations du vocabulaire tahitien avant et après les contacts européens", Journal of the Society of Oceanists, 1948, volume 4, pages 57–85.
