= 1957 French Polynesian legislative election =

- 3 November 1957
- All 30 seats in the Territorial Assembly; 15 seats needed for a majority
Party	Leader	Vote %	Seats	+/–
RPDT	Pouvanaa a Oopa	45.64	17	−1
Tahitian Union	Alfred Poroi	29.33	9	New
Cultivators		2.93	1	New
Social Action		2.69	1	New
UDSR		1.68	1	−4
Independents	—	8.37	1	+1
This lists parties that won seats. See the complete results below.

Legislative elections were held in French Polynesia on 3 November 1957 for the Territorial Assembly. The result was a victory for the ruling Democratic Rally of the Tahitian People (RDPT) led by Pouvanaa a Oopa, which won 17 of the 30 seats.

== Results ==
Party	Votes	%	Seats
Democratic Rally of the Tahitian People	10,077	45.64	17
Tahitian Union	6,475	29.33	9
Rally of Oceanic People	1,363	6.17	0
Cultivators of Tuamotu-Gambier	647	2.93	1
Independents of Social Action	593	2.69	1
France Tahiti	376	1.70	0
Democratic and Socialist Union of the Resistance	372	1.68	1
Peasants' Rally	103	0.47	0
Way of Tuamotu	95	0.43	0
Rally of Marquesian People	63	0.29	0
Producers of the Australs	49	0.22	0
Marquesian Independents	16	0.07	0
Independents	1,849	8.37	1
Total	22,078	100.00	30
Valid votes	22,078	99.56	
Invalid/blank votes	98	0.44	
Total votes	22,176	100.00	
Source: Assembly of French Polynesia

=== Elected members ===
Constituency	Member	Party
Austral Islands	Matani Mooroa	Democratic Rally of the Tahitian People
Austral Islands	Mauri Tahuhuterani	Democratic Rally of the Tahitian People
Leeward Islands	Edwin Atger	Independents of Social Action
Leeward Islands	Jean-Baptiste Céran-Jérusalémy	Democratic Rally of the Tahitian People
Leeward Islands	Gaston Deane	Democratic Rally of the Tahitian People
Leeward Islands	Pierre Hunter	Democratic Rally of the Tahitian People
Leeward Islands	Tautu Oopa	Democratic Rally of the Tahitian People
Leeward Islands	Marcel Tixier	Tahitian Union
Marquesas Islands	Henri Frébault	Democratic Rally of the Tahitian People
Marquesas Islands	William Grelet	Democratic and Socialist Union of the Resistance
Tuamotu and Gambier Islands	Ropa Colombel	Democratic Rally of the Tahitian People
Tuamotu and Gambier Islands	Jean Florisson	Democratic Rally of the Tahitian People
Tuamotu and Gambier Islands	Calixte Jouette	Tahitian Union
Tuamotu and Gambier Islands	André Porlier	Cultivators of Tuamotu-Gambier
Windward Islands	Rudy Bambridge	Tahitian Union
Windward Islands	Gérald Coppenrath	Tahitian Union
Windward Islands	Jacques Drollet	Democratic Rally of the Tahitian People
Windward Islands	Benjamin Céran-Jérusalémy	Democratic Rally of the Tahitian People
Windward Islands	Paul Bouzer	Democratic Rally of the Tahitian People
Windward Islands	Raymond Hopuare	Tahitian Union
Windward Islands	René Raphael Lagarde	Democratic Rally of the Tahitian People
Windward Islands	Georges Leboucher	Tahitian Union
Windward Islands	Benjamin Lehartel	Tahitian Union
Windward Islands	Charles Lehartel	Democratic Rally of the Tahitian People
Windward Islands	Pouvanaa a Oopa	Democratic Rally of the Tahitian People
Windward Islands	Alfred Poroi	Tahitian Union
Windward Islands	Nedo Salmon	Tahitian Union
Windward Islands	Jacques Tauraa	Democratic Rally of the Tahitian People
Windward Islands	John Teariki	Democratic Rally of the Tahitian People
Windward Islands	Frantz Vanizette	Independent
Source: Assembly of French Polynesia

== Aftermath ==
Following the elections, Jean-Baptiste Céran-Jérusalémy was elected President of the Assembly on 10 December. A new government was formed later in the month, including Walter Grand who had lost heavily in the Windward Islands constituency running on the France Tahiti list.

Post	Minister
Leader of the Government	Pouvanaa a Oopa
Minister of the Interior	Pouvanaa a Oopa
Minister of Economic Affairs	Jacques Tauraa
Minister of Education	Walter Grand
Minister of Finance	Henri Bodin
Minister of Health	René Raphael Lagarde
Minister of Public Works	Pierre Hunter
Source: Pacific Islands Monthly

However, following protests about an income tax law, the government was sacked by Governor Camille Victor Bailly in April 1958. Bailly subsequently appointed a new government led by Alfred Poroi.

Following the death of Tautu Oopa in 1961, his wife Céline won a by-election on 8 October 1961, becoming the first woman to sit in the Assembly.
