= 1967 French Polynesian legislative election =

- 10 September 1967
- All 30 seats in the Territorial Assembly; 15 seats needed for a majority
Party	Leader	Vote %	Seats	+/–
E'a Api	Francis Sanford	20.22	9	New
Here Ai'a	John Teariki	16.73	7	0
UT–UNR	Rudy Bambridge	9.61	6	−2
UDT	Alfred Poroi	6.83	3	−1
Austral Union			1	New
IAES			1	New
UM–UNR			1	New
TUNP			1	New
UTP			1	New
This lists parties that won seats. See the complete results below.

Legislative elections were held in French Polynesia on 10 September 1967 for the Territorial Assembly. The result was a victory for pro-autonomy parties E'a Api and Pupu Here Ai'a, which won 16 of the 30 seats.

== Background ==
The Democratic Rally of the Tahitian People, which had won the previous elections in 1962, was dissolved in November 1963.

== Electoral system ==
The 30 members of the Territorial Assembly were elected from five constituencies; the Austral Islands (2 seats), the Leeward Islands (6), the Marquesas Islands (2), Tuamotu–Gambier Islands (4) and the Windward Islands (16).

== Campaign ==
The main campaign issue was the question of self-governance. At one of its final meetings, the previous Assembly had debated proposals by Jean-Baptiste Céran-Jérusalémy that the territory should be an autonomous territory in the French Community, that a new flag should be created for the territory and used alongside the French flag and that Tahitian should become a co-official language alongside French. Assembly members voted to delay the decision until after the upcoming elections.

Following the Assembly debate, two new anti-autonomy parties were formed; the Democratic Polynesian Movement and Ia Ora O Polynesia. Other anti-autonomy parties included the Tahitian Union–Union for the New Republic alliance led by Rudy Bambridge and the Tahitian Democratic Union led by Alfred Poroi. Pro-autonomy parties included E'a Api led by Francis Sanford, Pupu Here Ai'a led by John Teariki and Te Oto I Te Nunaa led by Charles Poroi.

A total of 33 parties or party lists contested the elections, with 18 running in the Windward Islands. Pupu Here Ai'a was the only party to contest all five constituencies.

== Results ==
Twenty of the thirty winning candidates were new to the Assembly. The five candidates from minor parties were considered pro-autonomy.

Party	Votes	%	Seats	+/–
E'a Api	5,027		9	New
Pupu Here Ai'a	4,161		7	New
UT–UNR	2,390		6	–2
Tahitian Democratic Union	1,699		3	–1
Austral Union			1	New
Independents of Economic and Social Action			1	New
Marquesan Union–UNR			1	New
Tahoeraa Ui No Polynesia			1	New
Union of Workers and Fishermen			1	New
Total			30	0
Total votes	24,858	–		
Registered voters/turnout	36,897	67.37		
Source: Assembly of French Polynesia, Pacific Islands Monthly, Saura

=== Elected members ===
Constituency	Member	Party	Notes
Austral Islands	Pierre Hunter	Pupu Here Ai'a	
Austral Islands	Tetuaura Oputu	Austral Union	
Leeward Islands	Roger Amiot	E'a Api	
Leeward Islands	Adolphe Bohl	Pupu Here Ai'a	
Leeward Islands	Tetuanui Ehu	UT–UNR	Re-elected
Leeward Islands	Marcel Hart	Tahitian Democratic Union	Re-elected
Leeward Islands	William Tcheng	Pupu Here Ai'a	
Leeward Islands	Toro Teriirere	Tahitian Democratic Union	
Marquesas Islands	Guy Rauzy	E'a Api	
Marquesas Islands	André Teikitutoua	Marquesan Union–UNR	
Tuamotu–Gambier Islands	Calixte Jouette	UT–UNR	Re-elected
Tuamotu–Gambier Islands	Riquet Marere	UT–UNR	Re-elected
Tuamotu–Gambier Islands	André Porlier	Union of Workers and Fishermen	
Tuamotu–Gambier Islands	François Tinomano	E'a Api	
Windward Islands	Adolphe Agniery	E'a Api	
Windward Islands	Yannick Amaru	Pupu Here Ai'a	
Windward Islands	Rudy Bambridge	UT–UNR	Re-elected
Windward Islands	François Bordes	Pupu Here Ai'a	
Windward Islands	Henri Bouvier	Pupu Here Ai'a	
Windward Islands	Gaston Flosse	UT–UNR	
Windward Islands	Eugène Haereraaroa	E'a Api	
Windward Islands	Anthelme Logel	E'a Api	
Windward Islands	Daniel Millaud	E'a Api	
Windward Islands	Jean Millaud	E'a Api	
Windward Islands	Alfred Poroi	Tahitian Democratic Union	Re-elected
Windward Islands	Nedo Salmon	UT–UNR	Re-elected
Windward Islands	Francis Sanford	E'a Api	
Windward Islands	Charles Taufa	Tahoeraa Ui No Polynesia	
Windward Islands	John Teariki	Pupu Here Ai'a	Re-elected (previously RDPT)
Windward Islands	Frantz Vanizette	Independents of Economic and Social Action	Re-elected (previously UTD)
Source: Assembly of French Polynesia, Pacific Islands Monthly, Saura

== Aftermath ==
Following the elections, E'a Api and Pupu Here Ai'a agreed to work together to form a government. The new Assembly opened on 1 November and elected the five-member Council of Government; the Tahitian Democratic Union voted with the governing parties, electing Leon Assaud, Jean Roy Bambridge, Jean Juventin, Jacques Laurey and André Lonfevre were elected.

Following the death of Marcel Hart in January 1969, he was replaced by Sam Koua. Rudy Bambridge left the Assembly in March 1969 and was replaced by Jacques Teuira. Ah Kong Sham Koua also entered the Assembly during its term.
