= Rosa Raoulx =

French Polynesian chief and politician

Member of the Territorial Assembly
- In office 1962–1967
- Constituency: Windward Islands

President of Arue District Council
- In office 1950–1970
- Preceded by: Petero Pihatarioe
- Succeeded by: Terii Fougerousse

Personal details
- Born: 12 August 1908 Papeete, French Oceania
- Died: 17 May 1970 (aged 61)
- Party: Tahitian Democratic Union

Rosa Raoulx (12 August 1908 – 17 May 1970) was a French Polynesian chief and politician. She was the first woman to become president of a local council in Tahiti, and served as a member of the Territorial Assembly between 1962 and 1970.

== Biography ==
Raoulx was born in Papeete in 1908, the oldest of seven children. She was educated at the Sisters of Saint Joseph de Cluny school, before moving to the United States with her sister Louise at the age of 20 to try and find work. While in the United States, she met Arthur Emile Michaeli, whom she married in 1930.

The couple returned to French Oceania the same year, settling in the Marquesas Islands. They had a daughter and adopted a son named Arthur. In 1939 they moved to Arue in Tahiti, where Raoulx became involved with the local council. She began administering the council informally in 1941, before becoming Vice-President in 1946, and President in 1950, which also gave her the title of chiefess, the first woman to hold the title in Tahiti. She was made a Knight of the Legion of Honour in 1959. In 1961 she was a founder of the Women's Solidarity Group of Tahiti, serving as President of the Arue branch.

Raoulx was a Tahitian Democratic Union candidate in the 1962 Territorial Assembly elections, and was elected to from the Windward Islands constituency, becoming the second female member of the legislature after Céline Oopa. She served until the 1967 elections.

Raoulx died in May 1970 at the age of 62. In 1994 a new healthcare centre in Arue was named after her.
