= Walter Grand =

French Polynesian politician

Minister of Education
- In office 11 December 1957 – 28 October 1958
- President: Pouvanaa a Oopa

President of the Assembly of French Polynesia
- In office 10 June 1955 – 23 April 1958
- Preceded by: Noël Ilari
- Succeeded by: Georges Leboucher

Member of the French Polynesian Assembly for Papeete
- In office 18 January 1953 – 3 November 1957

Personal details
- Born: 29 June 1917 Papeete, French Polynesia
- Died: 6 July 1983 (aged 66) Papeete, French Polynesia
- Party: Rally of the French People

Walter Jean Tepuatauonini Grand (29 June 1917—6 July 1983) was a French Polynesian soldier and politician who served as president of the Assembly of French Polynesia from 1955 to 1958. He was the first Tahitian decorated for bravery in the Second World War.

== Early life and military career ==
Grand was born in Papeete and was the eldest of three children. His father died when he was 5 years old. Recalled during the general mobilization of September 1939, he was demobilized on 11 August 1940, with the rank of master corporal. In September 1940, he enlisted alongside his younger brother William in the French Liberation Army, and became a non-commissioned officer in the Pacific Battalion trained by Captain Félix Broche. Their younger brother Marcel enlisted in the New Zealand Army and campaigned in Papua. Grand took part in all the campaigns of his battalion. During the Battle of Bir Hakeim, in which his younger brother also took part (who would be injured there during the exit) and a few cousins (one of whom would be killed during the exit on 11 June), he commanded a truck-mounted 75-gun unit that put out a large number of Rommel's Panzers. During this same battle, he became the first Tahitian to be awarded the Croix de Guerre. He later fought in Italy and Provence before ending the war in Paris with the rank of adjudant.

On 5 May 1946 he returned to his native island aboard the Sagittaire and returned to civilian life. For a few years, he worked in inter-island navigation. On 23 August 1947 he married Charlotte Lévy with whom he had three children.

== Political career ==
In 1951 Grand entered local politics, when businessman Tony Bambridge convinced him to become president of a local branch of the Rally of the French People for the 1951 French legislative election. He was elected to the Assembly of French Polynesia in the 1953 French Oceanian legislative election. Following a dispute in the Assembly on 10 April, a fight broke out between Noël Ilari and Alfred Poroi. Ilari then challenged Poroi to a duel, which Poroi agreed should take place at the end of the day. Grand was appointed one of Ilari's seconds. The duel ultimately did not occur, after Governor René Petitbon broadcast a radio message forbidding it and stationed police at the homes of the participants. After relations soured with Bambridge, the RPF lost its funding, and Grand grew closer to the Democratic Rally of the Tahitian People. In 1955 he made a deal with the RDPT to change the majority in the Assembly, a move which saw him elected its president. As Assembly president, he welcomed General de Gaulle during his private visit to Tahiti in 1956.

He contested the 1956 French legislative election against both Bambridge and Pouvanaa a Oopa, but came third, with only 745 votes.

He contested the 1957 election on a new "France-Tahiti" list, with Gaston Flosse, but was not re-elected. He was subsequently appointed as Minister of Education in the government of Pouvanaa a Oopa. He lost his position as a Minister when the French colonial government dissolved Oopa's government following the 1958 French Polynesian constitutional referendum.

He died in Papeete on 6 July 1983 and is buried in Urania Cemetery.

== Successive ranks in the French army ==
- Master Corporal: August 11, 1940
- Sergeant: January 1, 1941
- Chief sergeant
- Warrant Officer: October 18, 1944

== Honors ==
- Knight of the Legion of Honor (1970)
- Médaille militaire (1946)
- Croix de guerre (1939–1945)
- Resistance Medal, with rosette (April 1946)
- Colonial Medal
- Croix de guerre des théâtres d'opérations extérieures
- Commemorative medal for voluntary service in Free France

Grand was nominated for the Order of Liberation at the end of the war, but did not receive it. He was instead proposed for the Military Medal and the Resistance Medal, with which he was decorated in 1946.
