= Jean-Baptiste Céran-Jérusalémy =

French Polynesian politician

President of the Assembly of French Polynesia
- In office 23 April 1958 – 27 May 1958
- Preceded by: Walter Grand
- Succeeded by: Georges Leboucher
- In office 14 March 1953 – 18 October 1953
- Preceded by: Albert Leboucher
- Succeeded by: Noël Ilari

Member of the French Polynesian Assembly for Windward Islands
- In office 14 October 1962 – 10 September 1967

Member of the French Polynesian Assembly for Leeward Islands
- In office 3 November 1957 – 14 October 1962

Personal details
- Born: 4 February 1921 Papeete, French Polynesia
- Died: 15 May 2014 (aged 93)
- Party: Democratic Rally of the Tahitian People; Pupu Tiama Maohi

Jean-Baptiste Heitarauri Céran-Jérusalémy (4 February 1921 — 15 May 2014) was a French Polynesian politician who served twice as president of the Assembly of French Polynesia. He was a founder of the Democratic Rally of the Tahitian People.

Céran-Jérusalémy was born in Papeete. After being dismissed from school, he worked at the public works department, and then the government printing office. During the Second World War he served in the local infantry company, but returned to the printing office after being demobilised in 1944. In 1947 he was a founder, with Pouvanaa a Oopa, of the Democratic Rally of the Tahitian People.

He was elected President of the Assembly following the 1953 French Oceanian legislative election. As president, he advocated for French Oceania to become a French Department. He resigned as president in October 1953 after the Assembly rejected a motion for Departmentalisation. In August 1954 he interrupted an Assembly session to demand reinstatement, but was unsuccessful.

In 1956 he was elected president of the RDPT. He was re-elected to the Assembly in the 1957 election, and elected president of the Assembly again in 1958. He was removed as president following the Gaullist riots which led to the sacking of Oopa's government. He was expelled from the RDPT in the leadup to the 1958 French Polynesian constitutional referendum, where he advocated a "yes" vote, and subsequently formed the RDPT-Te Aratai. Following Oopa's arrest on false charges of political violence, he disassociated himself completely from Oopa.

He was re-elected to the Assembly in the 1962 election as the only representative of the Pupu Tiama Maohi. The party was banned along with the RDPT by the French colonial authorities in November 1963 for advocating against French nuclear testing. He then founded the Pupu Tahoeraa Maohi, which was accused by the French of being a renewal of the same party. Following the French government's recognition of China in 1964, he advocated for Chinese-Tahitians to be granted citizenship. He lost his seat in the Assembly in the 1967 election.
