= 1991 French Polynesian legislative election =

← 1986	17 March 1991	1996 →
- All 41 seats in the Territorial Assembly; 21 seats needed for a majority
Party	Leader	Seats	+/–
Tāhōʻēraʻa Huiraʻatira	Gaston Flosse	18	−4
Polynesian Union	Alexandre Léontieff	14	New
Aia Api	Émile Vernaudon	5	
Tāvini Huiraʻatira	Oscar Temaru	4	+2
This lists parties that won seats. See the complete results below.

Legislative elections were held in French Polynesia on 17 March 1991 for the Territorial Assembly. Gaston Flosse's Tahoera'a Huiraatira won 18 of 41 seats, and Alexandre Léontieff's Polynesian Union coalition won 14. The Aia Api party won five, and Tāvini Huiraʻatira four.

Following the election Flosse formed a coalition with Émile Vernaudon's Aia Api and was elected President of French Polynesia. The coalition lasted only six months. In September 1991, Flosse fired two Aia Api ministers, and instead formed a coalition with Jean Juventin.

== Results ==
Party	Seats
Tahoera'a Huiraatira	18
Polynesian Union	14
Aia Api	5
Tāvini Huiraʻatira	4
Total	41
Source: Rapaport
