= Daniel Millaud =

French Polynesian politician

Senator for French Polynesia
- In office 1977–1998
- Preceded by: Pouvanaa a Oopa
- Succeeded by: Gaston Flosse

Member of the French Polynesian Assembly for Windward Islands
- In office 10 September 1967 – 22 May 1982

Personal details
- Born: 26 August 1928 Papeete, French Polynesia
- Died: 21 June 2016 Punaauia
- Party: E'a Api

Daniel Millaud (26 August 1928 — 21 June 2016) was a French Polynesian politician who represented French Polynesia in the French Senate from 1977 to 1998. He was a member of E'a Api. He was the nephew of politician Jean Millaud and the brother of politician Sylvain Millaud.

Millaud was born in Papeete. He was educated at Saint-Elme school in Arcachon, Gironde, then trained as a dentist.

He entered politics at the urging of his uncle and became a municipal councillor. He was elected to the Assembly of French Polynesia as an E'a Api candidate in the 1967 French Polynesian legislative election. He was re-elected at the 1972 election. At the 1977 election he was co-leader with Francis Sanford of the United Front, and was re-elected.

At the 1971 senatorial election he was deputy to Pouvanaa a Oopa, and filled Oopa's seat following his death in 1977. He was re-elected in the 1980 senatorial election. As a senator he called for a South Pacific common market, and for Clipperton Island to be annexed to French Polynesia. He was re-elected in 1989. In 1995 he condemned France's resumption of nuclear testing at Mururoa.

He died in June 2016 after a long illness.
