= Third Force (France) =

1947–1958 political alliance in France

Third Force Troisième Force
- Leader: Antoine Pinay (last)
- Founder: Robert Schuman, Paul Ramadier, and others
- Founded: 1947
- Dissolved: 1958 (official)
- Preceded by: Tripartisme
- Political position: Centre
- Party members: Popular Republican Movement; SFIO; Radical and Socialist Party; UDSR

The Third Force (French: Troisième Force [tʁwazjɛm fɔʁs]) was a political alliance during the Fourth Republic (1947–1958) which gathered the French Section of the Workers' International (SFIO) party, the Democratic and Socialist Union of the Resistance (UDSR), the Radicals, the Popular Republican Movement (MRP) and other centrist politicians who were opposed to both the French Communist Party (PCF) and the Gaullist movement. The Third Force governed France from 1947 to 1951, succeeding the tripartisme alliance between the SFIO, the MRP and the PCF. The Third Force was also supported by the National Centre of Independents and Peasants (CNIP), which succeeded in having its most popular figure, Antoine Pinay, named Prime Minister in 1952, a year after the dissolving of the Third Force coalition.

== History ==
During the later decades of the Third Republic, the majority of French voters and deputies belonged to the spectrum of numerous small liberal and republican parties of the centre-left and centre-right. During election-time, this spectrum tended to split in half, its centre-left wing cooperating in electoral lists with the main social-democratic/socialist party, the French Section of the Workers' International (SFIO), and its centre-right wing with the main Catholic party, the Republican Federation (URD), itself a liberal/republican party. Periodically, however, the parties of the broad centre attempted to form an alliance amongst themselves to lock out socialists and the religious liberal right from power: the policy of creating a government of 'third force' through the tactic of 'republican concentration'. At that time, given the balance of political support and the divisions among the republicans, such a tactic was rarely successful.

After the war and the installation of the Fourth Republic, the appearance of powerful mass political movements on the far-left and far-right, the French Communist Party and the Gaullists, provided a renewed incentive for the miscellaneous parties of the centre to combine their forces to lock out the extremes. The Third Force government was organised after the dismissal of vice-premier Maurice Thorez and four other Communist ministers from Paul Ramadier's government during the May 1947 crisis. The May 1947 crisis can be summarized as: "The Communists' refusal to continue support for the French colonial reconquest of Vietnam on one hand and a wage-freeze during a period of hyperinflation on the other were the immediate triggers to the dismissal of Thorez and his colleagues from the ruling coalition in May 1947". Nevertheless, the heterogeity of the Third Force increased the ministerial instability. Although it kept its majority after the 1951 legislative election, in part due to the change of voting system, it split over economic policies, laïcité and the financing of denominational schools. The SFIO left the cabinet and the following governments were formed by centrist and centre-right parties: the Radical Party, the UDSR, the MRP and the National Centre of Independents and Peasants.

The idea of reviving a Third Force between the centre-left and the centre-right in France has been raised periodically ever since. The Socialist Gaston Defferre and the Radical Jean-Jacques Servan-Schreiber advocated such an alliance in the 1960s, culminating in Defferre's disastrous candidacy in the 1969 presidential election. Presidents Valéry Giscard d'Estaing and François Mitterrand later unsuccessfully tried to revive the Third Force, the latter doing so in a sense by pursuing a policy of "ouverture" toward the Union for French Democracy after the failure of Mitterrand's Socialist Party and its allies to gain an outright majority in the 1988 legislative election. However, each time, the most important right-wing party, the Rally for the Republic (RPR), opposed such an alliance. This strategy is now followed by François Bayrou and the Democratic Movement (MoDem), a centrist party.

== Electoral results ==
=== French Parliament ===
National Assembly
Election year	# of overall votes	% of overall vote	# of overall seats won	+/–	Leader
1951	9,740,564 (#1)	51.80	388 / 625	–	Guy Mollet
1956	7,050,188 (#1)	32.41	214 / 595	▼174	Roger Duchet
1958	1,365,064 (#3)	7.5	57 / 576	▼157	Pierre Pflimlin
