= Teuira =

Teuira is both a given name and surname. Notable people with the name include:

- Teuira Henry (1847–1915), Tahitian scholar, ethnologist, folklorist, linguist, historian, and educator
- Jacques Teuira (born 1933), French politician
