= 1986 French Polynesian legislative election =

- 16 March 1986
- All 30 seats in the Territorial Assembly; 15 seats needed for a majority
Party	Leader	Vote %	Seats	+/–
Tāhōʻēraʻa Huiraʻatira	Gaston Flosse	40.11	22	+9
Amuitahira'a no Porinitia		16.77	5	New
Here Ai'a	Jean Juventin	13.92	5	−1
Ia Mana		8.23	3	0
Tāvini Huiraʻatira	Oscar Temaru	6.40	2	New
Other parties	–	14.56	4	
This lists parties that won seats. See the complete results below.

Legislative elections were held in French Polynesia on 16 March 1986 for the Territorial Assembly. The result was a victory for Tāhōʻēraʻa Huiraʻatira, which won 22 of the 41 seats. Its leader Gaston Flosse remained President of the Government.

== Background ==
Elections had been due to be held in 1987 at the end of the five-year term of the Assembly elected in 1982. However, in 1985 the government and opposition asked the French Council of Ministers for early elections be held. The request was approved and the Assembly was dissolved on 23 December. Prior to its dissolution, the Assembly adopted an amended electoral law increasing the number of seats from 30 to 41 and introducing an electoral threshold of 5%. Lists were also required to have two more candidates than the number of seats in the constituency to provide replacements and avoid the need for by-elections.

== Results ==
The initial results showed Tahoera'a Huiraatira winning 21 seats. However, after a recount in the Leeward Islands, they were awarded another seat.

Party	Votes	%	Seats	+/–
Tahoera'a Huiraatira	29,881	40.11	22	+9
Amuitahira'a No Polynesia	12,495	16.77	5	New
Here Ai'a	10,369	13.92	5	–1
Ia Mana	6,134	8.23	3	0
Tavini Huiraatira	4,770	6.40	2	New
Other parties	10,843	14.56	4	–
Total	74,492	100.00	41	+11
Registered voters/turnout	103,667	–		
Source: Henningham

== Aftermath ==
Following the elections, two members of the minor parties joined Tahoera'a Huiraatira, giving them 24 of the 41 seats. Gaston Flosse was subsequently elected president by a vote of 25 to 2. In addition to Flosse, four other Assembly members became ministers; Georges Kelly, Alexandre Léontieff, Jacques Teheiura and Michel Buillard. They were replaced in the Assembly by Franklin Brotherson, Roger Doom, Albert Taruoura. Emma Tetuanui and Lionel Watanabe.

Flosse cabinet
Post	Member
President of the Government	Gaston Flosse
Vice-President; Minister of Economy and Finance	Patrick Peaucellier
Minister of Agriculture and Traditional Crafts	Georges Kelly
Minister of Development, Transport, Post and Communications	Geffry Salmon
Minister of Education, Culture and Scientific Research	Jacques Teheiura
Minister of Employment, Housing and Public Services	Michel Buillard
Minister of Equipment, Planning, Energy and Mines	Gaston Tong Sang
Minister of Health, Scientific Research and Environment	Lysis Lavigne
Minister of Social Affairs, Solidarity and Family	Huguette Hong Kiou
Minister of Tourism and Sea	Alexandre Léontieff
Minister of Youth, Sports and Internal Affairs	Manate Vivish
