= Francis Sandford =

Francis Sandford may refer to:

- Francis Sandford (herald) (1630–1694), Anglo-Irish herald
- Francis Sandford, 1st Baron Sandford (1824–1893), English civil servant

== See also ==
- Frank Sandford (1862–1948), faith healer
- Francis Sanford (1912–1996), politician
