= 1996 French Polynesian legislative election =

← 1991	17 March 1996	2001 →
- All 41 seats in the Territorial Assembly; 21 seats needed for a majority
Party	Leader	Seats	+/–
Tāhōʻēraʻa Huiraʻatira	Gaston Flosse	22	+4
Tāvini Huiraʻatira	Oscar Temaru	10	+6
Aia Api	Émile Vernaudon	5	0
Here Ai'a		5	New
Independents	Boris Léontieff	1	+1
This lists parties that won seats. See the complete results below.

Legislative elections were held in French Polynesia in May 1996 for the Territorial Assembly. The result was a victory for Tahoera'a Huiraatira, which won 22 of 41 seats. The pro independence Tāvini Huiraʻatira more than doubled its representation, from 4 to 10 seats, Aia Api won five, and Here Ai'a one. The remaining three seats were taken by independents Boris Léontieff (affiliated to the Fetia Api party), Tinomana Ebb, and Lucien Kimitete.

Following the election Gaston Flosse was re-elected as President of French Polynesia.

== Results ==
Party	Seats
Tahoera'a Huiraatira	22
Tāvini Huiraʻatira	10
Aia Api	5
Here Ai'a	1
Independents	3
Total	41
Source: Von Strokirch
