= Roger Doom =

French Polynesian politician

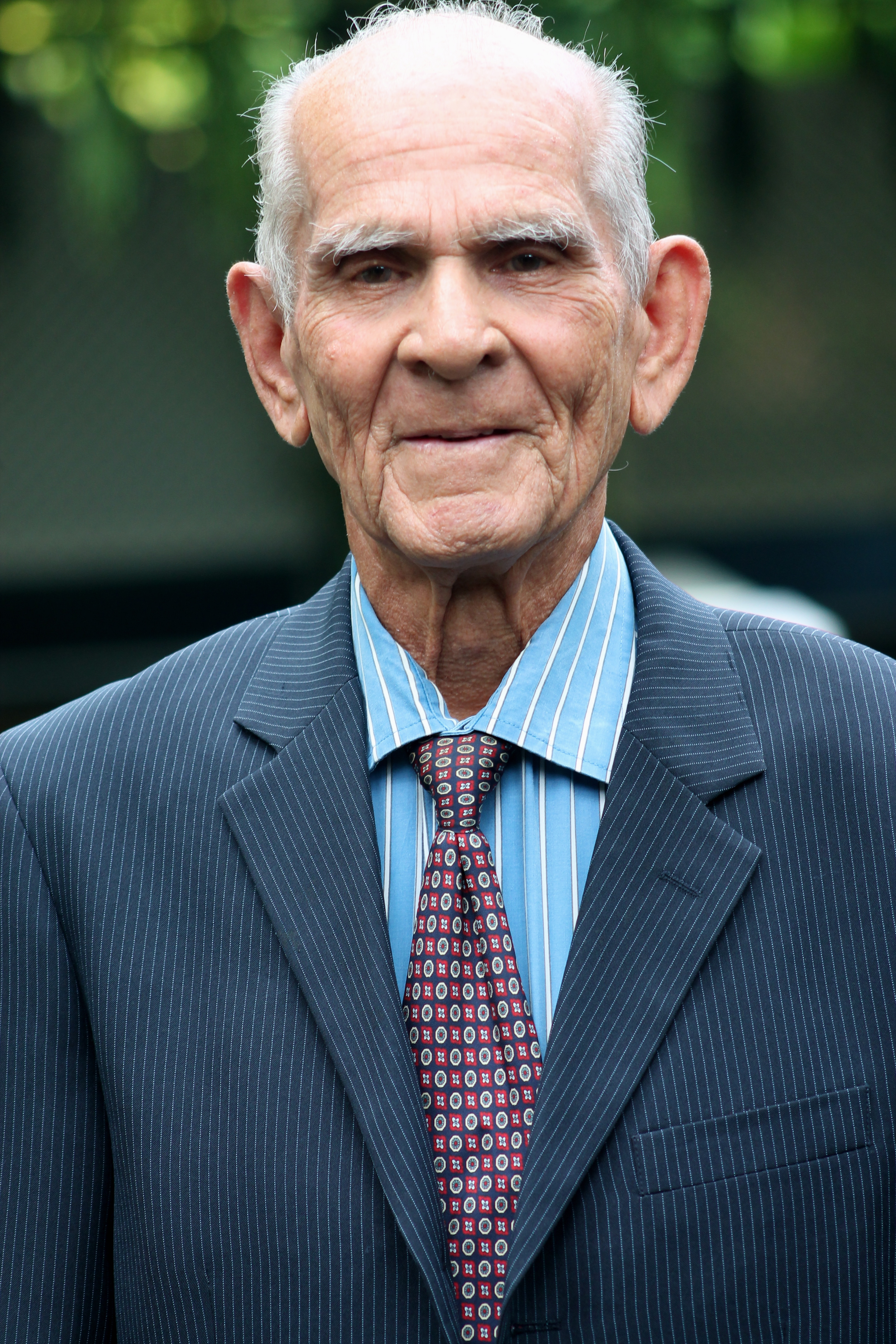
- Doom in 2015

President of the Assembly of French Polynesia
- In office 12 March 1987 – 10 May 1988
- Preceded by: Jacques Teuira
- Succeeded by: Jean Juventin

Personal details
- Born: 15 February 1935 Papeete, French Polynesia
- Died: 16 September 2016 (aged 81)

Roger Tumoana Leon Doom (15 February 1935 - 16 September 2016) was a French Polynesian politician who served as President of the Assembly of French Polynesia from March 1987 to May 1988.

Doom was born in Papeete and worked as a school principal. He was the first mayor of the associated commune of Vairao in Taiarapu-Ouest from 1972 to 2002. He was also a member of the Assembly of French Polynesia from 1972 to 2007, and its president from 12 March 1987 to 10 May 1988.

In June 2000 he was appointed an Officer of the Order of Tahiti Nui.

In March 2015 he was made a knight of the Order of Agricultural Merit.
