= 1947 strikes in France =

Series of insurrectionary labor actions

The 1947 strikes in France were a series of insurrectionary labour actions against post-war wage stagnation and Western capitalism. The strikes first emerged as a spontaneous wave in late April at the nation's largest Renault factory. When the French Communist Party (PCF) joined the strike, it led to the May crisis, which saw all communist officials expelled from the national government.

The peak wave in September was more generalized and more directly associated with the Cominform than the wave in May, and it explicitly denounced the Marshall Plan. Soon there were 3 million strikers; 23,371,000 working days were lost to strikes in 1947 versus 374,000 in 1946, but the movement stayed less important than in Italy, where the Communists were also excluded from the government. In May, the Communist ministers in effect left the government, which ended tripartisme, and at the end of the year the General Confederation of Labour (CGT) divided into a reformist minority and a pro-Atlanticist group called Workers' Force (FO). Although they had been created in December 1944, the Compagnies Républicaines de Sécurité (CRS) had their first real policing mission with the strikes of November–December 1947, all of which were under the leadership of Minister of the Interior Jules Moch (SFIO).

== Early strikes ==
The strikes began on 25 April 1947 at the Renault factory at Boulogne-Billancourt, which had been nationalized in 1946. The day before, Paul Ramadier's cabinet had reduced the daily bread ration from 300 to 250 grams.

The plant employed 30,000 men, and the CGT claimed 17,000 members. The strike was started, among other things, by the Trotskyist Pierre Bois, an activist of the communist union and a founder of Workers' Struggle, the anarchist Gil Devillard of the Anarchist Federation, and members of the Trotskyist International Communist Party (PCI). The importance of the PCI's involvement in the movement was made clear in an article published on 26 June 1947 in Cavalcades magazine, titled "A teacher, an engineer, a journalist, leaders of the Fourth International, could paralyse France tomorrow". The strike did not at first have the support of the CGT nor the PCF, which was part of the tripartisme coalition government. Plaisance, a secretary of the CGT, said outside the factory: "This morning, an anarcho-Hitlero-Trotskyist band wanted to blow up the factory". The CGT then claimed "The strike arms the trusts". Despite the communist opposition, the strike quickly brought in more than 10,000 workers. Eugene Hénaff, the secretary-general of CGT Metallurgy, was booed at Boulogne-Billancourt.

On 8 May, the government enacted a three-franc wage increase. On 9 May, two thirds of the CGT voted to return to work, but some remained on strike and paralysed the factory. The strike ceased on 15 May, after the government granted a bonus of 1600 francs and an advance of 900 francs for all employees.

== End of tripartisme and extension of strikes ==
The strikes spread. With an inflation rate of over 60% and rationing still in force, the black market remained important, and living conditions were difficult, particularly since France struggled to meet its energy needs.

On 5 May 1947, the Communist ministers were excluded from the government by Paul Ramadier. From that moment, the PCF and CGT supported the social movement, which extended to Citroën, SNCF, banks, department stores, Électricité de France, Peugeot, Berliet, Michelin, and others. The main reasons for the strikes were demands for higher wages, but the broader context was the formalization of the Cold War.

In June, a wave of insurrectionist strikes protested the Marshall Plan.

== November strikes ==
On 10 November 1947, after the Gaullist victory of the Rally of the French People in the municipal election in October, a vast movement of insurrectionary strikes shook the country for several months. It began in Marseille against tram fare increases. Four strikers were charged after the demonstrations. To free them, 4,000 demonstrators entered the courthouse and then went to City Hall. They insulted and defenestrated the Gaullist lawyer Michel Carlini, who had become alderman by defeating the communist Jean Cristofol by one vote. The demonstration then moved to the Opéra de Marseille district, where several nightclub owners were accused of organizing the black market. The young communist worker Vincent Voulant was killed by the Guerini mafia. At his funeral, on 14 November, three fourths of the Marseilles workforce was on strike.

The strike spread to miners; on 17 November, 10,000 of them stopped work to protest the dismissal of Leon Delfosse, the communist deputy director of the nationalized coal mines in the Nord-Pas-de-Calais basin. The next day, more than 80,000 miners were on strike. On 19 November, the strike resumed at Renault and Citroën and then spread to the Federation for National Education, the construction trade, steelworkers, dockworkers and all public services. In the Seine department, teachers went on strike for two weeks although the National Teachers' Union (SNI) refused to support the movement.

On 29 November, 30,000 striking mining, railway, and textile workers demonstrated in Saint-Étienne. Armed with iron bars, they faced the Compagnies Républicaines de Sécurité (CRS), which had been newly created by the socialist Interior Minister Jules Moch (SFIO), who also appealed to the army and the 11th Parachute Shock Regiment, the armed wing of the Service de documentation extérieure et de contre-espionnage (SDECE), to break the strikes. The creation of the riot police was to ensure the loyalty of police "relocating" the maintenance of order (it used police from across the country, not just in the locations concerned, to quell the riots). In the north, the military nevertheless assured that it would intervene only in case of violence and tolerate the miners if they had only stopped working.

In Saint-Étienne, protesters took advantage by riding on three military vehicles, which were armed with machine guns. The officers refused to fire on the protestors, who got hold of weapons from soldiers (they discreetly returned them afterwards) and forced the police to evacuate the station; 100 people were injured.

Among the miners, there were 100 sackings, 1000 suspensions and 500 forced displacements of gueules noires (miners) from one mine to another. During December debates, the legislation and the union were split.

On the night of 2 to 3 December 1947, activists of the Federation of Pas-de-Calais CGT sabotaged the Paris-Tourcoing rail link by unbolting two rails, which caused a train derailment near Arras at 3 am, leaving 16 people dead and 50 wounded.

PCF General Secretary Maurice Thorez was concerned about the radicalization of the movement, as shown in the reports of SDECE. Saboteur activists believed that the train was carrying CRS officers to support non-strikers from Arras who were supported by the Gaullist militants. The government was secretly negotiating with the PCF by exchanging immunity of four activists to the party supporting the resumption of work.

On 30 June 1953, the Supreme Court delivered a leading case and considered that the train was still responsible because it had, given the social climate, expected that kind of act.

In March 1954, the case rebounded when the former deputy René Camphin, formerly "Colonel Baudouin" of the Francs-tireurs et partisans and former leader of the Federation of Pas-de-Calais in 1947, was found dead in Paris. Refusing to criticize his superior to the central committee, Auguste Lecoeur, former deputy secretary of state who was responsible for the sabotage, committed suicide.

== Discussions in December ==
On 4 December, after extremely violent discussions, the National Assembly approved a law on the "defence of the Republic and the freedom to work". Three years later, the arrest of Dehaene caused the Council of State to consecrate the constitutional right to strike.

On 9 December 1947, the central strike committee, consisting of the CGT federations, ordered a return to work. Ten days later, a split divided the CGT, with a majority close to the PCF and led by Benoît Frachon, and the reformist minority, led by Léon Jouhaux, founded the CGT-Workers' Force.

The strike of 1947 at Renault also denounced the repression of the Malagasy Uprising. The PCF had been the only party in the French government to denounce the French colonial empire's atrocities in Madagascar, and with its expulsion, the other parties authorised an even more ruthless counter-insurgency.

Strikes also affected the railway from Dakar to Niger, where the railway workers demanded the same rights as their French counterparts.

Covert action by the Central Intelligence Agency (CIA) was later revealed to have been a factor in the strike. The CGT-Workers' Force was initiated with the financial support of American unions (including the AFL–CIO), and the funding was coordinated by CIA operative Irving Brown. Even earlier, the CIA had begun funding and arming the Guerini crime family to assault communist picket lines and to harass union officials in Marseilles. Several murders of striking workers were traced to the Guerinis at the time.
