= Marcel Hart =

French Polynesian politician (1909–1969)

Member of the Territorial Assembly
- In office 1962–1969
- Succeeded by: Sam Koua
- Constituency: Leeward Islands

Mayor of Uturoa
- In office 1959–1969
- Preceded by: Marcel Tixier
- Succeeded by: Philippe Brotherson

Personal details
- Born: 5 July 1909; Papeete, French Oceania
- Died: 27 January 1969 (aged 59)
- Political party: Tahitian Democratic Union

Marcel Hart (5 July 1909 – 27 January 1969) was a French Polynesian politician. He became Mayor of Uturoa in 1959 and a member of the Territorial Assembly in 1962, holding both positions until his death in 1969.

== Biography ==
Hart was born in Papeete in 1909. He was a shipowner, owning Tamarii Raiatea until 1966, when he replaced it with Temehani.

He entered politics in 1946, becoming a member of the municipal council of Uturoa. In 1959 he was elected mayor of the town. In the 1962 elections he was elected to the Territorial Assembly in the Leeward Islands constituency, representing the Tahitian Democratic Union. He was re-elected in 1967, the same year in which his wife Alice died.

In January 1969 Hart died in an industrial accident; while visiting a road-building site, he began operating a bulldozer and a ground collapse led to it falling into a ravine.
