= Tripartisme =

Mode of government in France from 1944 to 1947

Tripartisme (French: [tʁipaʁtism]) was the mode of government in France from 1944 to 1947, when the country was ruled by a three-party alliance of communists, socialists and Christian democrats, represented by the French Communist Party (PCF), the French Section of the Workers' International (SFIO) and the Popular Republican Movement (MRP), respectively. The official charter of tripartisme was signed on 23 January 1946, following the resignation of Charles de Gaulle, who opposed the draft of the constitution. The draft envisioned a parliamentary system, whereas de Gaulle favored a presidential system.

The traditional political class, which had included all the right-wing parties plus the Radical-Socialist Party that symbolized the Third Republic (1871–1940), was completely discredited by 1944. The reasons for this perceived lack of legitimacy included in the first instance the Collaborationism of several of these actors, as well as the failure in the 1930s to put an end to the economic crisis that had characterized the years of the Great Depression. Thus the Democratic Republican Alliance, the main center-right party after the First World War, had opted for Collaborationism, an option endorsed by its leader Pierre-Étienne Flandin plus other members like Joseph Barthélémy.

The political class was considered jointly responsible for the collapse in 1940 of the Third Republic following the disastrous Battle of France, which the historian Marc Bloch later described as the "strange defeat" (l'étrange défaite). In this way, Gaullism and Communism emerged as the most popular political forces in the country. De Gaulle, who favored a presidential system, quit the government in 1946 and henceforth remained in the opposition until his triumphal return during the May 1958 crisis. For their part, the MRP, SFIO and PCF each achieved somewhere between 20% and 30% of the votes, with approximately 150 deputies each between September 1944 and May 1947. Afterwards, the PCF and de Gaulle's Rally of the French People (RPF) became France's main parties; however, both remained in opposition, because on their own they could not muster the absolute majority needed to form a government, and an alliance between them was inconceivable. The Three-Parties Alliance was succeeded in government by the Third Force, which comprised the Democratic and Socialist Union of the Resistance (UDSR), the SFIO and the MRP, with the Gaullists and the Communists forming the opposition.

== History ==
=== The Provisional Government and the discrediting of the political class ===
After the liberation of France, the Vichy government was dissolved and the Provisional Government of the French Republic (GPRF) was instituted. With most of the political class discredited, and containing many members who had more or less collaborated with the enemy, Gaullism and Communism became the most popular political forces in France. Charles de Gaulle had led the Resistance abroad, while the PCF was nicknamed the "party of the 75,000 executed" (parti des 75 000 fusillés) because it had spearheaded the Resistance in metropolitan France. On the other hand, the Radical-Socialist Party, which symbolized by itself the French Third Republic (1871–1940), was completely discredited for the role it had taken both before and during the war; equally, the conservative parties were vilified for their role during the Collaboration.

The March 1944 Charter of the Conseil National de la Résistance (CNR), the umbrella organization of the Resistance which was dominated by the Communist Francs-Tireurs et Partisans (FTP), envisioned the establishment of a social democracy, including a planned economy. Classical liberalism had been discredited during the 1929 crisis and its inability to come up with a suitable response to the Depression.

The GPRF introduced a program of social reforms and laid the foundations of the French welfare state. It also enacted some nationalizations in strategic or/and Collaborationist-controlled economic sectors (including the 1946 founding of Électricité de France electricity company, the 1945 nationalization of the AGF insurance firm, the nationalization of the Crédit Lyonnais bank in 1945 and the Société Générale bank in 1946, as well as the nationalization of the car maker Renault, which had been accused of Collaborationism). Trade union independence was guaranteed by the 1946 Charter of Amiens. This program comprised a substantial part of the so-called acquis sociaux (social rights) established in France during the second half of the twentieth century.

Charles de Gaulle led the GPRF from 1944 to 1946. Meanwhile, negotiations took place over the proposed new Constitution, which was to be put to a referendum. De Gaulle advocated a presidential system of government, and criticized the reinstatement of what he pejoratively called "the parties system". He resigned in January 1946 and was replaced by Félix Gouin (SFIO). Ultimately only the PCF and the SFIO supported the draft Constitution, which envisaged a form of government based on unicameralism; but this was rejected in the referendum of 5 May 1946.

=== The 1946 elections ===
For the 1946 elections, the Rally of the Republican Lefts (Rassemblement des gauches républicaines), which encompassed the Radical-Socialist Party, the UDSR and other conservative parties, unsuccessfully attempted to oppose the MRP-SFIO-PCF alliance. The new Constituent Assembly included 166 MRP deputies, 153 PCF deputies and 128 SFIO deputies, giving the Tripartite alliance an absolute majority. Georges Bidault (MRP) replaced Félix Gouin as the head of government.

A new draft of the Constitution was written, which this time proposed the establishment of a bicameral form of government. Léon Blum (SFIO) headed the GPRF from 1946 to 1947. After a new legislative election in June 1946, the Christian-Democrat Georges Bidault assumed leadership of the cabinet. Despite de Gaulle's so-called discourse of Bayeux of 16 June 1946, in which he denounced the new institutions, the new draft was approved by the French people, with 53% of voters voting in favor (with 31% in abstention) in the 13 October 1946 referendum. This culminated in the establishment in the following year of the Fourth Republic, an arrangement in which executive power essentially resided in the hands of the President of the Council. The President of the Republic was given a largely symbolic role, although he remained chief of the Army and as a last resort could be called upon to resolve conflicts.

The PCF won the most votes of any party in the November 1946 elections, achieving 28.8% of the vote and prompting the Communist Maurice Thorez to make an unsuccessful bid for the presidency of the council.

=== The Fourth Republic ===
The 1946 Constitution establishing the Fourth Republic, (1947–1958) created a parliamentary Republic, as distinct from the presidentialism which would characterize the Fifth Republic (1958-). Accordingly, the composition of the government was determined by the make-up of the Parliament, and heavily relied on the formation of alliances between the most popular parties, which in practice meant the MRP, the SFIO and the PCF.

The PCF refused to approve war credits for Indochina on 19 March 1947. Minimum wages were introduced on 31 March, while Paul Ramadier's SFIO government heavily repressed the Madagascar insurrection, resulting in 90,000 – 100,000 deaths. When Charles de Gaulle created the Rally of the French People (RPF) in April 1947, the MRP prohibited its members from joining it. The MRP ceased to be the party of Gaullism and instead defined itself as Christian Democrat.

=== End ===
Tripartisme collapsed with the May 1947 crisis in which Ramadier's government excluded the Communist ministers from participating; this was the event that marked the official start of the Cold War in France. The May 1947 crisis could be described as the result of the Communists' refusal to continue support for the French colonial reconquest of Vietnam on the one hand plus a wage freeze during a period of hyperinflation on the other, which were the immediate causes of Maurice Thorez and his colleagues being dismissed from the ruling coalition in May 1947. From this moment on the Fourth Republic was plagued by parliamentary instability because two of France's most popular parties, de Gaulle's RPF and the PCF, remained on the opposition benches.

== See also ==
- Blum-Byrnes agreement
- Marshall Plan
- 1947 strikes in France

== Wikisource ==
- 1946 Constitution (French)
