= Te Tiarama =

- Founder: Alexandre Léontieff
- Ideology: Fiscal conservatism Social liberalism Social democracy Environmentalism
- Political position: Centre to Centre-left

Te Tiarama is a French Polynesian political party formed by former President of French Polynesia Alexandre Léontieff in January 1988. Léontieff created the new party on January 23, 1988 following his departure from Tahoera'a Huiraatira and a rift with Gaston Flosse.

== See also ==
- List of political parties in French Polynesia
- Elections in French Polynesia
- Assembly of French Polynesia
- Politics of French Polynesia
