= Léon Lichtlé =

French politician (born 1941)

Minister of Agriculture
- In office 19 September 2007 – 23 February 2008
- President: Oscar Temaru

Member of the French Polynesian Assembly for Marquesas
- In office 29 May 1977 – 23 May 1982

Personal details
- Born: 26 May 1941 (age 84) Marquesas Islands
- Party: E'a Api

Léon Lichtlé, also known as Léon Témooheiteaoa (born 26 May 1941), is a former French Polynesian politician and Cabinet Minister. He served as Mayor of Ua Huka for 30 years. He was a member of E'a Api.

In 1978 he established a citrus arboretum in Ua Huka.

He was elected to the Assembly of French Polynesia in the 1977 French Polynesian legislative election. He was elected as mayor of Ua Huka in 1979. In September 2007 he was appointed Minister of Agriculture in the government of Oscar Temaru.
