= 1949 French Oceania by-election =

On August 3, 1949, the incumbent member of the French National Assembly from French Oceania, Georges Ahnne died. A by-election was held on October 22, 1949, to fill the vacant seat. The election was won by Pouvanaa a Oopa, who got 62% of the votes cast.
