= Georges Ahnne =

French Polynesian politician

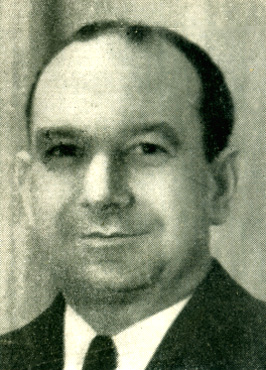
- Ahnne in 1946

Member of the French National Assembly for French Polynesia
- In office 2 June 1946 – 3 August 1949
- Preceded by: Charles Vernier
- Succeeded by: Pouvanaa a Oopa

Personal details
- Born: 21 March 1903 Papeete, French Polynesia
- Died: 3 August 1949 (aged 46) Garches, France
- Party: Democratic and Socialist Union of the Resistance

Georges Ahnne (21 March 1903 – 3 August 1949) was a French Polynesian politician who represented French Polynesia in the French National Assembly from 1946 until his death in 1949.

Ahnne was a descendant of Protestant missionaries. He studied law in Bordeaux and worked as a lawyer in Papeete. He was elected to the Constituent Assembly in the June 1946 French legislative election. He was re-elected in the November 1946 French legislative election. He was succeeded as MP by Pouvanaa a Oopa.
