= Marcel Oopa =

French Polynesian politician

- Marcel Oopa

Member of the French National Assembly for French Polynesia
- In office 20 July 1960 – 14 July 1961
- Preceded by: Pouvanaa a Oopa
- Succeeded by: John Teariki

Personal details
- Born: 21 April 1917 Fare, French Polynesia
- Died: 14 July 1961 (aged 44) Paris, France
- Party: Democratic Rally of the Tahitian People

Marcel Pouvanaa Oopa (21 April 1917 — 14 July 1961) was a Tahitian politician, the son of the Tahitian leader Pouvanaa a Oopa. He belonged to the political party Democratic Rally of the Tahitian People (RDPT), led by his father. Marcel Oopa was a carpenter by profession.

Marcel Oopa joined the Pacific Battalion during the Second World War, and fought in North Africa. He fought at battle of Bir Hakeim and in military campaigns in Libya and Tunisia. Marcel Oopa received the croix de guerre medal as well as the Resistance Medal, French Liberation Medal and the Libya campaign medal.

In 1950 Marcel Oopa took part in the first May Day celebrations in the history of French Polynesia, participating in military uniform. In 1959 he became a councillor in the Leeward Islands, replacing his deceased uncle.

In 1960 Marcel Oopa was elected to the French National Assembly from the French Polynesia seat in a by-election, after his imprisoned father had been deposed from his parliamentary seat. Marcel Oopa sat in the group 'Popular Republicans and Democratic Centre' (RPCD, the parliamentary faction of the Popular Republican Movement).

Marcel Oopa died of cancer at the Tenon Hospital in Paris on July 14, 1961. His father had been allowed to sit by his bed, after intense pressure from Tahitian on the French authorities. Marcel Oopa's seat in the French National Assembly was temporarily filled by John Teariki, also from the RDPT.
