= Here Ai'a =

Rally of the Maohi People Here Ai'a
- President: Gustave Taputu
- Founded: 9 February 1965
- Ideology: Pro-independence; Anti-nuclear
- Political position: Centre
- Colours: Pink
- National Assembly (French Polynesian seats): 0 / 3
- Senate (French Polynesian seats): 0 / 2
- Assembly of French Polynesia: 0 / 57

Here Ai’a (English: Love of the Land), also known as Te Pupu Here Ai'a Te Nunaa ia Ora (English: Patriotic Group for an Autonomous Polity), is a pro-independence political party in French Polynesia. It was founded by John Teariki and Henri Bouvier in 1965 following the banning of the pro-independence Democratic Rally of the Tahitian People (RDPT) by the colonial French government. Supported mainly by rural Polynesians, the party was a significant force in French Polynesian politics from its foundation until the early 1980's, before entering a decline following Teariki's death in 1983. The party is currently led by Gustave Taputu.

The party was founded on 9 February 1965. In order to avoid being seen as an illegal re-establishment of the RDPT, the party avoided placing former RDPT leaders in leadership positions, and stated that its objective was "a democratic development of French Polynesia in close collaboration with the French people and according to the preamble of the Constitution of 1958”. It held its first congress on 2 July 1966, the day of the first French nuclear test at Moruroa, and passed a motion stating that it would use all peaceful and legal means to end nuclear testing.

The party won 7 seats out of 30 at the 1967 French Polynesian legislative election and formed a coalition government with the pro-autonomy E'a Api led by Francis Sanford. One of the first moves of the new government was to establish an Assembly investigation into the question of internal self-government. The proposals of the government were ignored by the French colonial authorities, leading to a deterioration in relations. At the 1971 municipal elections the party won the mayoralty of Uturoa, and was part of an autonomist coalition which won all 27 seats on the Papeete council, despite French interference.

Pouvanaa a Oopa led the party into the 1972 election. The party won six seats, but lost power to an anti-autonomy coalition.

The party contested the 1977 election with E'a Api and other minor parties as part of the United Front for Internal Autonomy. The coalition won 13 seats and was able to form a government with allies. In government the party suffered from several scandals, but managed to survive them and the subsequent breakup of the coalition. At the 1982 election, which it contested separately, it won 6 seats, but was relegated to opposition.

The party's leader John Teariki died in 1983, and he was succeeded by Jean Juventin. The party suffered from an internal power-struggle, and when the colonial government finally provided a weak form of autonomy in 1985, advocacy for real independence was left to other parties such as Ia Mana te Nunaa. While the party won 5 seats at the 1986 election, it continued to decline in relevance. In 1991 it backed anti-independence President Gaston Flosse. In the 2004 election it joined Oscar Temaru's Union For Democracy (UPLD) coalition. It remained part of the UPLD in the 2008 election. At the 2013 election it formed an electoral alliance with Porinetia Ora, but gained no seats. In the 2018 election it supported Tahoera'a Huiraatira.

After being inactive for 15 years, the party announced on 21 January 2023 that it would contest the 2023 election, and that its program would focus on independence. It held its first party congress in 15 years in February 2023, announcing it was seeking allies in Heiura-Les Verts or Tau Hotu rau.

== Election results ==
=== Territorial elections ===
Year	1st round			2nd round			Seats
Year	Votes	%	Place	Votes	%	Place	Seats
1967						2nd	7 / 30
1972						3rd	7 / 30
1977	Part of United Front for Internal Autonomy						0 / 30
1982				9,451	15.7	2nd	6 / 30
1986						3rd	5 / 41
1991	Endorsed Tahoera'a Huiraatira						0 / 41
1996						4th	1 / 41
2001							0 / 49
2004	Part of Union for Democracy (UPLD)						0 / 57
2008	Part of Union for Democracy (UPLD)						0 / 57
2013	Part of All Polynesians						0 / 57
2018	Endorsed Tahoera'a Huiraatira						0 / 41
