= Gérald Coppenrath =

French Polynesian lawyer and politician

Gérald Coppenrath (22 April 1922 – 4 November 2008) was a French Polynesian lawyer and politician who represented French Polynesia in the Senate of France between 1958 and 1962.

Born in Papeete, Tahiti he moved to France and studied at the University of Poitiers. He later returned to Tahiti in 1948. He was elected to the Assembly of French Polynesia in the 1957 French Polynesian legislative election as a candidate for the Tahitian Union. On 8 June 1958 he was elected senator, winning by 13 votes to 11. He was re-elected on 26 April 1959, when he won by 43 votes against 17. He stayed in office until 1962. He was the first president of the Papeete bar from 1973 To 1974. He was the older brother of Hubert and Michel Coppenrath. Both became Archbishops. Michel died on 16 August 2008.

Coppenrath died on 4 November 2008.
