= John Teariki =

French Polynesian politician

Member of the French National Assembly
- In office 1961–1967
- Preceded by: Marcel Oopa
- Succeeded by: Francis Sanford
- Constituency: French Polynesia

President of the Territorial Assembly
- In office 1969–1970, 1971–1972, 1978–1979, 1980–1981

Member of the Territorial Assembly
- In office 1957–1983
- Succeeded by: Jean-Baptiste Trouillet
- Constituency: Windward Islands
- In office 1953–1957
- Constituency: Peninsula, Moorea, Maiao, Makatea

Personal details
- Born: 12 July 1914 Afareaitu, French Oceania
- Died: 5 October 1983 (aged 69) Papeete, French Polynesia
- Party: RDPT, Here Ai'a

John French "Tony" Teariki (12 July 1914 – 5 October 1983) was a French Polynesian politician. He served as a member of the French National Assembly from 1961 to 1967, and as a member of the Territorial Assembly from 1957 until 1983.

== Biography ==
Teariki was born in Afareaitu in 1914. He grew up in the Cook Islands, but attended the Protestant School in Papeete until being called home at the age of 14 to look after the family farm, his father having died in 1918. He also became a skipjack fisherman, losing an eye while fishing aged 20 and started a sea transport business linking Moorea and Tahiti.

In 1949 Teariki was a founder member of the Democratic Rally of the Tahitian People (RDPT). He was elected president of Afareaitu district in 1952, and was elected to the Territorial Assembly from the Peninsula, Moorea, Maiao and Makatea constituency the following year. He was re-elected to the Territorial Assembly from the Windwards Islands constituency in 1957.

In the 1960 by-election for the French Polynesian seat in the French National Assembly, he was the substitute for Marcel Oopa. Oopa was elected, but died the following year, resulting in Teariki becoming a member of the National Assembly. He was re-elected to both the National Assembly and Territorial Assembly in 1962, but rarely attended sittings of the National Assembly. After the RDPT was banned in 1963, he founded Here Ai'a, and was re-elected to the Territorial Assembly in 1967, although he lost his National Assembly seat the same year when he was defeated by Francis Sanford. In 1968 he bought a farm at Taravao, where he raised dairy cows and chickens.

Tearik continued to be re-elected to the Territory Assembly in 1972, 1977 and 1982, and served as its president in 1969–1970, 1971–1972, 1978–1979 and 1980–1981. He was also mayor of Moorea-Maiao from 1972.

He died following an agricultural accident at his farm in October 1983. His funeral was attended by over 2,000 people and he was buried at the Uranie cemetery in Papeete.
