= May 1947 crises =

Communists were excluded from government in Italy and France

In the May 1947 crises, also referred to as the exclusion crises, the Communists were excluded from government in Italy and France. The crises contributed to the start of the Cold War in Western Europe.

== In Italy ==
In Italy, the Christian Democracy (DC), led by Alcide De Gasperi, were losing popularity, and feared that a leftist coalition would take power. The Italian Communist Party (PCI) was growing particularly fast due to its organizing efforts supporting sharecroppers in Sicily, Tuscany and Umbria, movements which were also bolstered by the reforms of Fausto Gullo, the Communist minister of agriculture. On 1 May, the nation was thrown into crisis by the murder of eleven leftist peasants (including four children) at an International Workers' Day parade in Palermo by Salvatore Giuliano and his gang. In the political chaos which ensued, the president engineered the expulsion of all left-wing ministers from the cabinet on 31 May; ministers belonging to the Italian Socialist Party (PSI), which was closely allied with the Communists, were also removed from the cabinet; the PSI would not have a national position in government again for twenty years. De Gasperi did this under pressure from US Secretary of State George Marshall, who had informed him that anti-communism was a pre-condition for receiving American aid, and Ambassador James C. Dunn who had directly asked de Gasperi to dissolve the parliament and remove the PCI.

The Italian political crisis and anti-communist movement were dependent on Mafia violence. The Mafia made deep connections with the Christian Democrats in the mid-1940s through figures such as Calogero Vizzini, who was also an operative for the US military. The politicized Mafia employed terror as a tactic against the labor movement and the Communist Party, killing dozens of leftists in this period. The 1 May massacre by Salvatore Giuliano is often alleged to be one of these Christian Democrat-associated events. According to Peter Robb, "The mafia had commissioned the crime for the politicians...just as it was picking off individual communists, socialists, and trade unionists. Another dozen had been killed that same year of 1947...The mafia was making itself useful to its new political protectors by dispatching its enemies, a pattern that was to continue for decades." Prior to his mysterious killing in state custody, Guiliano lieutenant Gaspare Pisciotta implicated the DC directly for the massacre through Ministry of the Interior Mario Scelba. Writers such as Gaia Servadio and Peter Dale Scott believe there was US involvement through an intelligence-mafia network run by William J. Donovan. While specific accusations are controversial, there is consensus that Giuliano "was being used as a vanguard in a domestic political battle with the Communists."

== In France ==
In France, conflicting policies of members of the governing Tripartisme coalition, which included the democratic socialist French Section of the Workers' International (SFIO), the French Communist Party (PCF) and the Catholic Popular Republican Movement (MRP), created tensions, and economic conditions were dire under the presidency of Paul Ramadier. The French Communist Party (PCF) had the support of one in every four voters, polling the largest percentage of votes of any party between 1946 and 1956. Ramadier received warnings from the US Ambassador Jefferson Caffery that the presence of Communists in the government would lead to the blocking of American aid, or perhaps worse. ("I told Ramadier," Caffery wrote in his diary, "no Communists in gov. or else"). Ramadier began looking for a pretext to purge them. As the great French strikewave of 1947 began, a rumor circulated among the ministers in Ramadier's party, the SFIO, that the Communists were plotting a coup for 1 May, and the military was secretly mobilized. The Communist ministers opposed Ramadier in a vote on wages policies, and, on 5 May 1947, he expelled them from the government. The following year, the US rewarded France with hundreds of millions of dollars in Marshall Plan aid. No evidence of coup plot was ever found, and it was confirmed that the PCF had initially opposed the April strikes. The Communist Party's absence from government in France lasted well beyond the fall of the Fourth Republic, and the effect of this absence upon the party system and the stability of government have prompted historians such as Maynard Williams to describe 5 May 1947 as 'the most important date in the history of the Fourth Republic'.

== Related events ==
Communist ministers were dismissed from several other European governments in 1947 and in all cases the move was dictated by a desire to comply with the wishes of the United States. These maneuvers led the Soviets to harden their approach to foreign policy, establishing the Cominform.

At the same time as Communist ministers were being dismissed from Western governments, the Soviets were consolidating their hold over what would become the Eastern Bloc. On 30–31 May, Ferenc Nagy—the democratically elected prime minister of Hungary—resigned from office under threats from the Hungarian Communist Party, which accused him of involvement in an alleged anti-state plot. His Independent Smallholders' Party had won a large majority in the 1945 Hungarian parliamentary election, but Communist salami tactics had progressively whittled its gains away, particularly in early 1947 when the Communists accused its key members of involvement in anti-state plots. The Soviet Union, whose army was occupying Hungary at the time through the Allied Commission, played a key role this process by providing the supposed evidence of the Prime Minister's involvement, and also kidnapped Béla Kovács—the Smallholders' Party's popular General Secretary—to deport him to the Soviet Union in defiance of Parliament. By May, the Smallholders' Party had been deprived of its elected majority as a result of mass arrests and exclusions of its MPs, and Nagy was politically isolated. He received the Communists' ultimatum while travelling abroad in Switzerland, and the latter threatened to harm Nagy's son if the Prime Minister did not resign or return to Hungary to face trial. Nagy agreed to step down, but he did not formally ratify his resignation until his hostage son had reached exile on 2 June. In addition, Nikola Petkov, the vocal leader of the Bulgarian opposition, was arrested soon after on 4 June to be tried for treason in August and executed in September. The timing of this was no doubt related to the Hungarian coup. Thus, the European geopolitical order of the next forty years was largely decided by May–June 1947.

== See also ==
- Reverse Course

== Sources ==
- Ginsborg, Paul (2003). A History of Contemporary Italy: Society and Politics, 1943-1988, Palgrave Macmillan, ISBN 1-4039-6153-0
- Williams, Philip Maynard (1972). Crisis and Compromise: politics in the Fourth Republic, Longmans
