= Mataiea =

- Associated commune of Teva I Uta
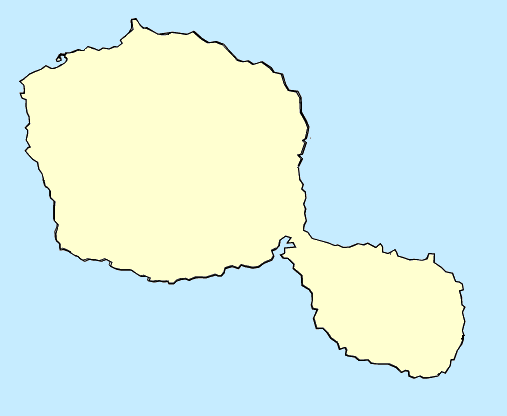
- Location within Tahiti
- Location of Mataiea
- Coordinates: 17°45′59″S 149°23′58″W
- Country: France
- Overseas collectivity: French Polynesia
- Commune: Teva I Uta
- Elevation: 6 m (20 ft)
- Population (2022): 5,391
- Time zone: UTC−10:00

Mataiea is an associated commune on the island of Tahiti, in French Polynesia. It is the administrative centre of the commune of Teva I Uta.
