= Conseil regional de l'environnement de Montreal =

Canadian environmental organization

The Conseil Régional de l'Environnement de Montréal is a not-for-profit environmental organization in Montreal, Quebec, Canada.

The council's website indicates that it was founded in 1996. It is an umbrella group for several different organizations; in 1999, there were thirty-five member groups. Former Quebec cabinet minister Robert Perreault was the council's director-general for several years. In 2005, he spoke against an extension of Quebec Autoroute 25.

== Directors-General ==
Director Generals:

- Robert Perreault (2001–07)
- André Porlier (2007–10)
- Coralie Deny (2010–)
