= Alexandre Léontieff =

Former President of French Polynesia

3rd President of French Polynesia
- In office December 8, 1987 – April 4, 1991
- Vice President: Georges Kelly
- Preceded by: Jacques Teuira
- Succeeded by: Gaston Flosse

Vice-President of French Polynesia
- In office September 14, 1984 – April 15, 1986
- President: Gaston Flosse
- Preceded by: Office established
- Succeeded by: Patrick Peaucellier

Personal details
- Born: October 20, 1948 Teahupo'o, Tahiti, French Polynesia, France
- Died: March 2, 2009 (aged 60) Tahiti, French Polynesia, France

Alexandre Léontieff (October 20, 1948 – March 2, 2009) was a French politician and the President of French Polynesia from 1987 to 1991.

== Biography ==
=== Personal life ===
Léontieff was born on October 20, 1948, at Teahupo'o, Tahiti, near the world famous surfing location. He obtained a degree in economics from the University of Rennes in 1970.

Léontieff was of Russian ancestry and the brother of French Polynesian politician Boris Léontieff, a one time cabinet minister in the government of Gaston Flosse and former mayor of Arue, French Polynesia. Boris Léontieff later became the leader of his own political party, Fetia Api. He is believed to have been killed in a small plane crash in May 2002 while on a political campaign trip in the Tuamotu Archipelago. The plane's wreckage and passengers have never been found. Boris Léontieff was 47 years old at the time of his death.

== Political career ==
=== President of French Polynesia ===
Léontieff was originally a protégé of Gaston Flosse in the Tahoera'a Huiraatira political party during the 1980s. Flosse's Tahoera'a Huiraatira endorsed Léontieff's election as one of French Polynesia's two deputies in the National Assembly of France in 1986. Léontieff held the seat in the National Assembly until 1993, despite a later rift with Flosse and the Tahoera'a Huiraatira.

Flosse became French Polynesia's first president from 1984 until 1987. In February 1987, Flosse resigned from the presidency in order to become the first, and only, French state secretary in charge of Pacific affairs. However, Léontieff was passed over as Flosse's handpicked successor in favor of Jacques Teuira, who became French Polynesia's second president.

Léontieff responded by forming a majority coalition in the Assembly of French Polynesia with others politicians opposed to Flosse and Teuira. Léontieff's coalition filed a censure motion against Teuira, which was adopted by the Assembly. The move forced Flosse's handpicked successor, Jacques Teuira, to resign as President of French Polynesia in December 1987.

Léontieff became President on December 9, 1987. He served as president from 1987 until 1991. Léontieff quit Gaston Flosse's Tahoera'a Huiraatira political party, and founded his own party, Te Tiarama, on January 23, 1988.

Gatson Flosse left his post in the French government in 1988 and returned to French Polynesia. Flosse became the main opposition leader in the Assembly during Léontieff's four-year presidency.

Flosse's Tahoera'a Huiraatira political party defeated Léontieff's governing coalition in the 1991 legislative elections on March 17, 1991. Léontieff left office on April 4, 1991, and was succeeded by Flosse.

=== Post-presidency ===
Léontieff returned to political office in 1996 when he won a seat in the Assembly of French Polynesia. The time he was elected as a member of Oscar Temaru's Tavini Huiraatira, a pro-independence political party.

A Paris Criminal Court convicted Léontieff of corruption in three separate cases in 1997. He sentenced to two years in prison in 1999, following a series of appeals.

Gaston Flosse and Alexandre Léontieff reconciled their past personal and political differences in 2001, amazing political observers and French Polynesian analysts. Flosse rewarded Léontieff by naming him as a manager of an investment company charged with welfare housing. Flosse further resurrected Léontieff's career and reputation by appointing him the head of Caisse de Prevoyance Sociale (CPS), French Polynesia's welfare office, in 2004. He remained the director of the CPS until his death in 2009, despite numerous changes in presidential administrations between 2004 and 2009.

=== Death ===
Alexandre Léontieff died of a heart attack on March 2, 2009, at the age of 60. His was laid in state in the main hall of the Assembly of French Polynesia and buried on March 4, 2009, at the Uranie Cemetery in Tahiti.

The current President of French Polynesia Oscar Temaru quoted the 1947 Nobel Prize winning French author André Gide in tribute to Léontieff, "Good workers always have the feeling they could work harder."

Political offices
Preceded by Jacques Teuira	President of French Polynesia; 1987 – 1991	Succeeded by Gaston Flosse
