= Aia Api =

Political party in French Polynesia

The Aia Api (English: New Land) is a political party in French Polynesia. It was founded in 1982 by Émile Vernaudon.

At the last legislative elections on May 23, 2004, and by-elections on February 13, 2005, the party was part of the Union for the Democracy (Union pour la Démocratie), that won 27 out of 57 seats.

The party was officially deregistered in January 2015 for failing to submit its annual accounts.
