= 1958 French Polynesian constitutional referendum =

A referendum on the new constitution of France was held in French Polynesia on 28 September 1958 as part of a wider referendum held across the French Union. The new constitution would see the country become part of the new French Community if accepted, or result in independence if rejected. It was approved by 64.40% of voters.

== Campaign ==
Some members of the Democratic Rally of the Tahitian People (RDPT), which had been removed from power by Governor Camille Bailly in April 1958, backed a 'no' vote. Government officials restricted campaigning by opponents of the new constitution, and in some outlying islands, voters were unaware that 'no' was an option.

== Results ==
The result saw 64% of voters vote in favour of the constitution. However, Pacific Islands Monthly noted that it was thought by some that 'no' would have won had the RDPT been allowed to campaign properly.

| Choice | Votes | % |
|---|---|---|
| For | 16,196 | 64.40 |
| Against | 8,952 | 35.60 |
| Total | 25,148 | 100.00 |
| Valid votes | 25,148 | 99.61 |
| Invalid/blank votes | 99 | 0.39 |
| Total votes | 25,247 | 100.00 |
| Registered voters/turnout | 30,950 | 81.57 |
Source: Direct Democracy

== Aftermath ==
Following the referendum, there was civil unrest in the island of Tahiti, with RDPT supporters starting fires with molotov cocktails on 10–11 October. As a result of the violence, RDPT leader Pouvanaa a Oopa and 22 supporters were arrested. Oopa was subsequently convicted of arson and exiled to France. The conviction was quashed by the Court of Revision in 2018 after new evidence showed that French police had fabricated evidence or extracted it by threats of violence, and that the Governor had reported Pouvanaa's arrest before the fires had even been set.
