= Francis Sanford =

French Polynesian politician (1912–1996)

Member of the National Assembly
- In office 1967–1978
- Constituency: French Polynesia's 1st constituency

Personal details
- Born: 11 May 1912 Papeete, Tahiti
- Died: 21 December 1996 (aged 84) Faʻaʻā, French Polynesia

Francis Ariioehau Sanford (11 May 1912 – 21 December 1996) was a French Polynesian politician. He served as a member of the French National Assembly from 1967 until 1978.

== Early life ==
Sanford was born in Papeete and had an American grandfather. He initially worked in the docks, before becoming a waiter and then a teacher. After 1932, he became a civil servant, becoming Station chief in the Gambier Islands. In 1939 he married Elisa Snow, with whom he had five children. During World War II he rallied the "Free French" and acted as liaison officer to the Americans in Bora Bora. After the war he returned to education, working as a teacher in Bora Bora. In 1956 he was appointed Director of Primary Education in the French Polynesian government.

== Political career ==
In 1965 Sanford was elected mayor of Faʻaʻā. In the 1967 elections to the French National Assembly, he was elected as the French Polynesian deputy, defeating incumbent MP John Teariki by 13,633 votes to 13,285. In the National Assembly he initially joined the Independent Republicans, before switching to the Progress and Modern Democracy group following the 1968 elections. He later joined the Reformist Movement after its foundation in 1972.

He remained a member of the National Assembly until 1978, and later served as President of French Polynesia's Council of Government. He was also the founder of the Aia Api party. He retired from politics in 1985.
