= Jean Juventin =

French politician (1928–2019)

Mayor of Papeete
- In office 13 March 1977 – 23 April 1995
- Succeeded by: Michel Buillard

Deputy of the National Assembly for French Polynesia's 1st constituency
- In office March 1978 – 1 April 1986
- Succeeded by: Alexandre Léontieff
- In office March 1993 – 1 April 1997
- Preceded by: Alexandre Léontieff
- Succeeded by: Michel Buillard

Personal details
- Born: 9 March 1928 Papeete, French Polynesia
- Died: 28 May 2019 (aged 91)

Jean Juventin (9 March 1928 – 28 May 2019) was a French politician. He was mayor of Papeete from 1977 to 1995. He was also president of the Assembly of French Polynesia from 1988 to 1991 and again from 1992 to 1995 and a deputy of the National Assembly for French Polynesia's 1st constituency from 1978 to 1986 and 1993 to 1997. He was a member of the Rally for the Republic political party.

== Biography ==
A school teacher then school director, Jean Juventin was a member of the autonomist party Here Ai'a created in 1965 by John Teariki to replace the dissolved Democratic Rally of the Tahitian People in 1963. In 1967 he was elected to the Council of Government by the Territorial Assembly.

He was elected mayor of Papeete in the municipal elections of 13 March 1977, and was re-elected on 6 March 1983 and 13 March 1989. In March 1978, he was elected to the French National Assembly, and was re-elected in 1981, serving until 1986. He was elected to the National Assembly again in 1993, serving until 1997.

He became president of Here Ai'a after the accidental death of John Teariki in 1983.
