= Democratic and Socialist Union of the Resistance =

Defunct political party in France

Democratic and Socialist Union of the Resistance Union démocratique et socialiste de la Résistance
- Abbreviation: UDSR
- President: René Pleven
- Founded: June 25, 1945
- Dissolved: June 6, 1964
- Merged into: CIR
- Ideology: Social liberalism Anti-communism; Factions: Liberal socialism Conservatism
- Political position: Centre to centre-left
- National affiliation: Rally of Republican Lefts (1946-1955); Republican Front (1956-1958)
- International affiliation: Liberal International

The Democratic and Socialist Union of the Resistance (French: Union démocratique et socialiste de la Résistance, UDSR) was a French political party founded after the liberation of France from German occupation, mainly active during the Fourth Republic (1947–58). It was a loosely organised "cadre party" without mass membership. Its ideology was vague, including a broad diversity of different political convictions, and it was variously described as left-wing, centrist, and even conservative. It was decidedly anti-communist and linked with the Paix et Liberté ("Peace and Liberty") movement. The UDSR was a founding member of the Liberal International in 1947.

== Foundation ==
It was founded in 1945 by the non-communist majority of the Movement of National Liberation, a major network of the Resistance. The project was to create a French labour party uniting non-communist members of the French Resistance. However, this plan was derailed by the rebirth of the French Section of the Workers' International (SFIO), the emergence of the new Christian-Democratic party Popular Republican Movement (MRP) and the creation of the Gaullist Rally of the French People (RPF). The UDSR then associated itself with the Radical Party, which had been in government during most of the Third Republic, within the Rally of Republican Lefts (Rassemblement des gauches républicaines or RGR), which presented itself as an alternative to the tripartisme alliance between the SFIO, the MRP and the French Communist Party (PCF).

== Fourth Republic ==
Following the May 1947 crisis, during which Maurice Thorez (Communist vice-premier) and four other PCF ministers left Paul Ramadier's government, the UDSR took part in the Third Force coalition which united centre-left and centre-right parties in opposition to the PCF on the one hand, and the RPF on the other. It remained, throughout the Fourth Republic, a minor centrist political party, though it participated in various governments. Its president René Pleven was named President of the Council of Ministers from 1951 to 1952, before being succeeded by Antoine Pinay of the CNIP. Pleven's leadership was eventually challenged by François Mitterrand, who advocated a realignment to the Left, and took the lead in 1953.

In 1956 the UDSR participated in the centre-left Republican Front coalition, headed by Pierre Mendès-France, which won the legislative election. However, two years later, the UDSR imploded; indeed, Pleven and the party’s conservative wing approved Charles de Gaulle's comeback during the May 1958 crisis, in the midst of the Algerian War and threats of a coup d'état, and the institutions of the Fifth Republic, unlike Mitterrand, who called the new Constitution a "permanent coup d'état."

== Legacy ==
The UDSR survived until 1964, when it merged into Mitterrand's Convention of Republican Institutions (CIR), which itself merged at the 1971 Epinay Congress into the new Socialist Party (PS), which until 2017 was the main centre-left party in France.

== See also ==
- French Fourth Republic
