= Jacques Teuira =

Former President of French Polynesia

2nd President of French Polynesia
- In office 12 February 1987 – 9 December 1987
- Vice President: Jacques Teheiura
- Preceded by: Gaston Flosse
- Succeeded by: Alexandre Léontieff

Personal details
- Born: 1933 (age 92–93)
- Party: Tahoera'a Huiraatira

Jacques "Jacky" Teuira (born 1933) is a French politician and was the President of French Polynesia from 12 February 1987 to 9 December 1987.

== Biography ==
He served as the President of the Assembly of French Polynesia from April 1983 to March 1987.

Teuira's predecessor, Gaston Flosse, was the first President of French Polynesia, and the head of Teuira's political party, the pro-autonomy Tahoera'a Huiraatira. In February 1987, Flosse resigned from the presidency in order to become the first, and only, French state secretary in charge of Pacific affairs. Flosse chose Jacky Teuira as his handpicked successor as President over his longtime protégé, Alexandre Léontieff. Teuira was sworn in as President of French Polynesia on 12 February 1987.

Teuira's administration in French Polynesia would last less than a year. Léontieff responded to be passed over for the presidency by forming a majority coalition in the Assembly of French Polynesia with others politicians opposed to Flosse and Teuira. The move forced Teuira to resign as President of French Polynesia in December 1987.

Political offices
| Preceded by Gaston Flosse | President of French Polynesia; 1987 | Succeeded by Alexandre Léontieff |
