= Pouvanaa a Oopa =

French Polynesian politician

- Pouvanaa a Oopa

Senator for French Polynesia
- In office 1971–1977
- Preceded by: Alfred Poroi
- Succeeded by: Daniel Millaud

Member of the French National Assembly for French Polynesia
- In office 4 August 1949 – 12 February 1960
- Preceded by: Georges Ahnne
- Succeeded by: Marcel Oopa

Personal details
- Born: 10 May 1895 Maeva, Huahine, French Polynesia
- Died: 10 January 1977 Papeete
- Party: Democratic Rally of the Tahitian People; Pupu Here Aia

Pouvana'a a O'opa (May 10, 1895 – January 10, 1977) was a Tahitian politician and advocate for French Polynesian independence. He is viewed as the metua (father) of French Polynesia's independence movement.

Pouvanaa served as a Deputy in the National Assembly of France from 1949 — 1958, when he was convicted on charges of arson and sentenced to eight years imprisonment and 15 years exile in France. After being pardoned in 1968, he served as a Senator from 1971 until his death in 1977. His conviction was quashed in 2018 after new evidence showed that French police had fabricated evidence or extracted it by threats of violence, and that the Governor had reported Pouvanaa's arrest before the fires had even been set.

== Biography ==
=== Early life ===
Pouvanaa a Oopa was born in 1895 in Maeva, on the island of Huahine. His mother was of Polynesian descent while his father was a Danish sailor.

He was a veteran of World War I, serving in the Pacific Battalion of the French army. Pouvanaa also worked as a "fried-potato vendor" and a carpenter.

=== Politics ===
During World War II, Pouvanaa criticized people who profited financially from the war, and was exiled to a reef islet in his native Huahine in 1942. Following the end of the war and the liberation of France, Pouvanaa continued to criticize French colonial rule in the islands. In 1947 he was prosecuted for "challenging government authority", but acquitted. In October 1947 he founded a political party, the Democratic Rally of the Tahitian People (RDPT), which advocated Tahitian nationalism and an end to French colonial rule.

Pouvanaa was first elected as a deputy in the National Assembly of France in the 1949 French Oceania by-election, following the death of Georges Ahnne, becoming the first French Polynesian to serve in the French Chamber of Deputies. He was further re-elected to the French National Assembly in 1951 and 1956.

He became the leader of the local government administration of the islands in 1958. Under the slogan of "Tahiti for the Tahitians; Frenchmen into the sea!", Pouvanaa's RDPT swept local elections. He accused the government of France allowing the local economy to deteriorate. As part of the local government, Pouvanaa and his supporters enacted French Polynesia's first income tax, in order to gain more revenue from the local economy, which was dominated by ethnic French and Chinese businesspeople. A strike by business leaders, and a riot in Papeete, in which the French Polynesian Assembly was pelted with stones, led to the law being repealed.

Pouvanaa was a strong advocate of in favor of independence for French Polynesia during the French Polynesian referendum of 1958, which was part of the wider French constitutional referendum. He campaigned in favor of the 'no' vote against the French constitution and in support of independence from France. However, government officials restricted campaigning by the 'no' side, and in some outlying islands voters were unaware that 'no' was an option. The 'no' vote was defeated in the referendum by a margin of 62–36%, and French Polynesia remained a French territory. However, some local commentators believe 'no' would have won if they had been able to campaign freely.

=== Arrest and exile in France ===
In 1958 Pouvanaa was charged with arson in Papeete. He was accused of leading unrest and trying to burn down the city. In October 1959 he was found guilty and sentenced to eight years in prison and an additional fifteen years of exile in metropolitan France. He was released from prison in 1962. French President Charles de Gaulle pardoned Pouvanaa in 1968 and he returned to French Polynesia in 1969.

=== Later life ===
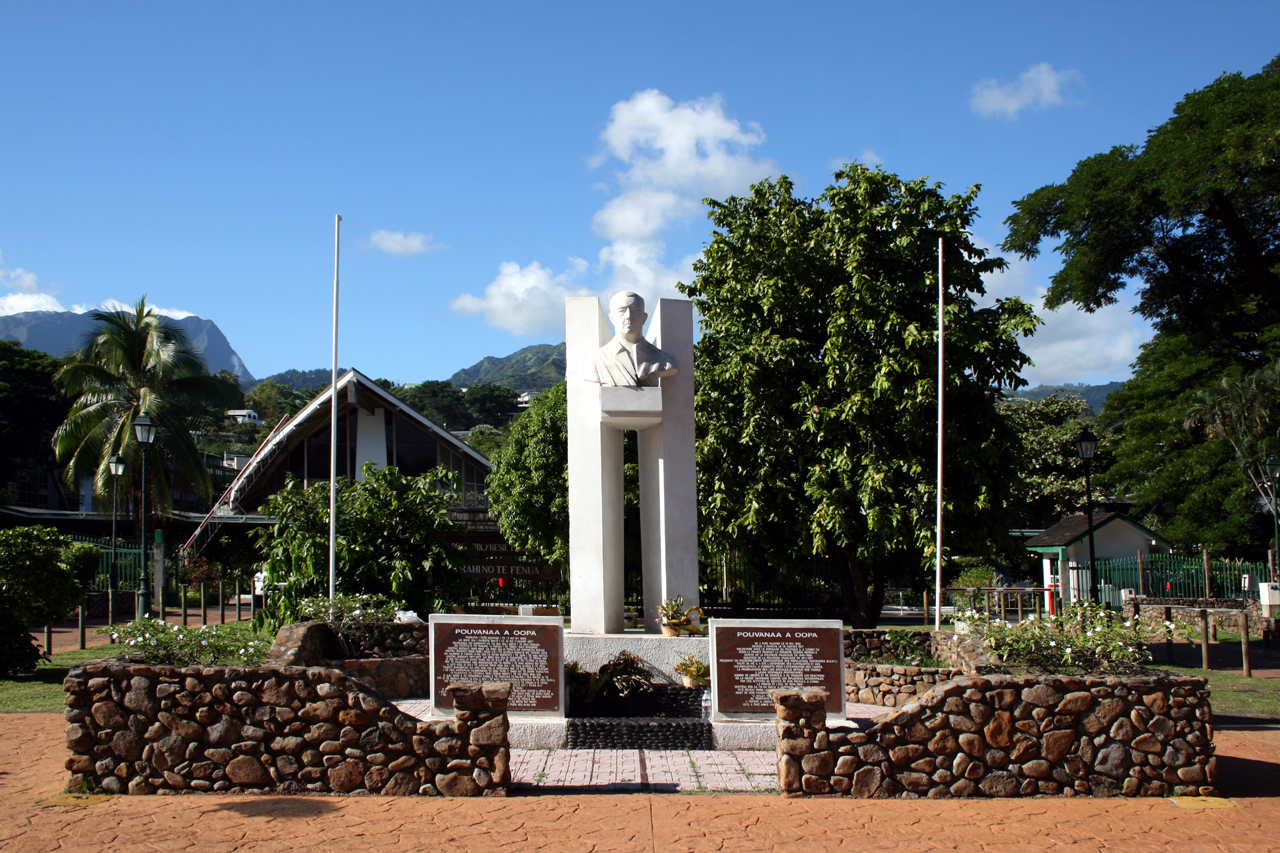
The Pouvanaa a Oopa Monument

Pouvanaa campaigned for and was elected to the French Senate, representing French Polynesia, in 1971. He continued to hold this office until his death in 1977.

Pouvanaa died on January 10, 1977, in Tahiti.

=== Legacy ===
In 1982, the Pouvanaa a Oopa Monument was erected in Papeete in front of the Assembly of French Polynesia. The memorial in memory of Pouvanaa became a rallying point for Tahitian during the French nuclear tests of 1995. Nearly one third of the Tahitian adult population gathered at Pouvanaa's memorial in July 1995 to protest against French nuclear detonations in the Tuamotu Archipelago. A street in Papeete, Avenue Pouvanaa A Oopa, is also named in his honor.

Pouvanaa's family requested a new trial in 1988, though their request was denied by the French Justice Department in Paris.

In July 2009, the Assembly of French Polynesia unanimously passed a resolution asking the French government for a new trial for Pouvanaa a Oopa. The call was repeated in 2013. In 2018 his conviction was quashed by the Court of Revision after new evidence showed that French police had fabricated evidence or extracted it by threats of violence, and that the Governor had reported Pouvanaa's arrest before the fires had even been set. Patrick O'Reilly claimed that the accusations were the result of a "Molotov cocktail [that] had been thrown over a wall by a city employee, and then recovered by another city employee." (Note: "Lorsqu’après la condamnation de Pouvana’a a O’opa sur une accusation fausse (le cocktail Molotov censé incendier la ville avait été envoyé par-dessus un mur par un employé de la mairie et aussitôt récupéré de l’autre côté du mur par un autre employé de la même mairie)")

== See also ==
- Marcel Oopa, son of Pouvanaa a Oopa
