= Democratic Rally of the Tahitian People =

Democratic Rally of the Tahitian People Rassemblement démocratique des populations tahitiennes
- Leader: Pouvanaa a Oopa
- Founded: November 17, 1949
- Dissolved: 1963
- Newspaper: Te Aratai
- Ideology: Maohi minority politics

The Democratic Rally of the Tahitian People (French: Rassemblement démocratique des populations tahitiennes, abbreviated RDPT) was a political party in French Oceania/French Polynesia. The party was led by Pouvanaa a Oopa.

== Political profile ==
Pouvanaa had been elected to the French National Assembly in 1949. After that victory, the 'Pouvanaa Committee' (formed by his Pouvanaa's supporters for the election campaign) and a group of ex-servicemen founded the RDPT on November 17, 1949. At the time of its foundation, the party proposed various political and social reforms in favour of the Maohi community, such as calling for land reform, expanded access to education and employments in the public sector, strengthened social security. The party sought to increase the powers of the Territorial Assembly, achieving greater autonomy from metropolitan France. RDPT published a bulletin called Te Aratai

The RDPT rapidly became widely popular amongst the Maohis. In particular it attracted support from poor rural populations. Pouvanaa retained his seat in the French National Assembly in the 1951 and 1953 elections. RDPT leaders Dr. Florisson and Jean-Baptiste Céran-Jérusalémy became French Senator and French Union assemblyman, respectively. In the 1951 election, Pouvanaa had won with 70% of the votes in French Oceania. The party won the January 18, 1953 Territorial Assembly election, winning 18 out of 25 seats. Notably, Pouvanaa did not get elected from the Papeete seat he contested.

Gradually RDPT was radicalised. It began calling for Tahitian take-over of French- and Chinese-owned businesses, substituting French officials with Tahitians, return of Tahitian lands to Tahitians and substituting the French tricolour with flag used during the reign of Queen Pomare.

== Political confrontations ==
However, running the regional government became increasingly difficult for the party. The RDPT sought to build a national economy through the introduction of an income tax scheme, to prepare the islands for independence. The French government had become increasingly bothered by the influence of RDPT, and the local Governor conspire against the RDPT government. Protests against the RDPT government were mobilized by the urban opposition, the Chinese community and in particular the French business community. Moreover rivalry between Pouvanaa and Céran had reached a critical point at the time of the 1958 referendum, and Céran was expelled. Céran's followers founded a rival party, RDPT-Aratai.

== Pouvanaa jailed ==
Pouvanaa campaigned for independence in the 1958 referendum. After the referendum, Pouvanaa was arrested. He was accused of plotting a revolutionary uprising, by setting the capital Papeete on fire. He was subsequently sentenced to eight years in jail, and another 15 years of banishment from French Polynesia. Pouvanaa's supporters consistently claimed that he had been framed, and in 2018 this was confirmed, with the revelation that his arrest had been announced before the fires had been set, and that police had fabricated evidence or extracted it by threats of violence; his conviction was quashed by the Court of Revision.

In 1960 Pouvanaa a Oopa's son, Marcel Oopa, was elected to the French National Assembly as a RDPT candidate. He died in 1961, and his seat was temporarily filled by John Teariki. In the 1962 National Assembly election, RDPT candidate John Teariki was elected from French Polynesia. Territorial Assembly elections were held the same year. With 14 out of 30 seats, RDPT retained its position as the largest party in the Assembly albeit their number of seats had decreased. After the election RDPT formed a coalition government.

== Nuclear test and ban ==
Once it became publicly known that France intended to conduct tests of Nuclear bombs in French Polynesia, the RDPT was radicalised. Not only the party oppose the testing programme, it also revived its campaign for Polynesian autonomy. In 1963, President Charles de Gaulle issued a ban on the party, invoking a law that enabled outlawing political organizations that threatened French 'national integrity'. The decision was motivated by a message from Pouvanaa to RDPT from jail, which had called on the party on advocate full independence.

In 1965 elected representatives of RDPT formed a new party (with Teariki at its helm), Here Ai'a.
