= Louise Kimitete =

Louise Kimitete (24 June 1939 - 25 March 2020) was a French Polynesian choreographer, dancer and teacher of Tahitian dance.

== Biography ==
Louise Kimitete was born in Hatihe'u, on the island of Nuku Hiva in the Marquesas Islands in French Polynesia in 1939. She began dancing at the age of sixteen, with the group 'Arioi, led by Mémé de Montluc, then with Heiva, led by Madeleine Moua.

After a stay of about ten years in Hawaii where she participated in film shoots, in 1981 she joined the Artistic Conservatory of French Polynesia (CAPF) created two years earlier in Papeete. She taught Ori Tahiti there for nearly forty years, becoming one of the emblematic figures.

She counts among her students people who have become big names in Ori Tahiti, including Vanina Ehu, who became head of the traditional CAPF department, Moon, her granddaughter, Hinavai Raveino, Tuarii Tracqui, Teraurii Piritua, Mateata Legayic, Moena Maiotui, and Kehaulani Chanquy.

She retired in 2012. She died on March 25, 2020, at the age of 80.

== Tributes and posterity ==
In 2012 she was made a knight of the Ordre national du Mérite. The insignia was awarded by Manouche Lehartel.

On her death, the Minister of Culture Heremoana Maamaatuaiahutapu and the director of the artistic conservatory Fabien Dinard paid tribute to her. For the Minister, Kimitete “summarizes, through her incredible journey, the renaissance movement of traditional Tahitian dance”.

In July 2022 La Poste issued a stamp with her image.
