= Tapura Amui no Tuhaa Pae =

Political party in French Polynesia

The Tapura Amui No Tuhaa Pae (English: Austral Archipelago Union List; also known as Tapura Amui No Te Faatereraa Manahune) was a political party in French Polynesia. They had a left political leaning, and advocated for French Polynesian independence.

The party small in their scope, only lasting between the years of 2001 and 2018, and only taking part in 4 elections with a single representative, Chantal Florès-Tahiata, in all elections. Chantal Florès-Tahiata was also the mayor of Tubuai.

They were largely created for the Tapura Amui no te Faatereraa Manahune - Tuhaa Pae coalition.

== Elections ==
=== 2001 ===
For the Territorial elections of 2001, Chantal Florès-Tahiata was elected in the Austral Islands.

Party	Seats
Tahoera'a Huiraatira	28
Tāvini Huiraʻatira	13
Fetia Api	7
Independents [Tapura Amui no Tuhaa Pae]	1
Total	49

=== 2004 and Political Crisis ===
For the Territorial elections of 2004, Chantal Florès-Tahiata was re-elected in the Austral Islands for the Tapura Amui no te Faatereraa Manahune - Tuhaa Pae coalition and joined the Union for Democracy (UPLD) group. Foe this election, the party campaigned on national radio and television broadcasts.

The party took part in the 2004 French Polynesian Political crisis, when the main opposition party, Union for the Democracy with the help of the single seat parties of Fetia Api, No Oe E Te Nunaa and Tapura Amui no Tuhaa Pae formed a grand coalition to defeat the government of Gaston Flosse. The single seat parties, including Tapura Amui no Tuhaa Pae, were pivotal in this, as if any of them had lost their seats in the 2004 election the conservative government of Gaston Flosse would have been able to survive.

Tapura Amui no Tuhaa Pae was especially important in this election due to the specifically tight election on the Austral Islands. The Tapura Amui no Tuhaa Pae party won 1223 votes with 34.10% of the votes cast. However, Gaston Flosse's Tahoeraa won 2363 votes with 65.90% of the votes cast. The Tahoeraa party had won an overall 28 seats in the election and needed only 1 more seat to have a majority within the assembly. Yet the party missed the third seat by only 28 votes.

Party	Seats
Tahoera'a Huiraatira	28
Union for the Democracy (TH–AA–HA–TANTFMTP–TANR)	26
Fetia Api	1
No Oe E Te Nunaa	1
Tapura Amui no Tuhaa Pae	1
Total	57
Source: Assembly

=== 2008 ===
For the 2008 territorial elections, Chantal Florès-Tahiata was again re-elected in the Austral Islands for the Tapura Amui no te Faatereraa Manahune - Tuhaa Pae coalition. During this election, there was a political campaign which aired on national radio and television. For the Windward Islands, the party advertised on the dates of January 21, and 22 of 2008. There were also broadcasts on January 22 and 25 on the Leeward Islands.

Party	First round		Second round		Seats
Party	Votes	%	Votes	%	Seats
To Tatou Ai'a (Note: Coalition of O Porinetia To Tatou Ai'a, Rautahi, Aia Api, Fetia Api, Te mana Toa and Taatiraa no te Hau)	41,061	32.69	55,257	42.84	23
Union for Democracy (Note: Coalition of Tavini Huiraatira and Tapura Amui No Raromatai)	40,050	31.89	47,811	37.07	19
Tahoera'a Huiraatira	27,403	21.82	21,965	17.03	10
No Oe E Te Nunaa	6,612	5.26			0
Te Henua Enata a Tu	2,772	2.21			2
Te Niu Hau Manahune	2,035	1.62	2,502	1.94	2
Tapura Amui no Tuhaa Pae	1,183	0.94	1,448	1.12	1
Other	4,486	3.57			–
Total	125,602	100.00	128,983	100.00	57
Valid votes	125,602	99.00	128,983	99.05	
Invalid/blank votes	1,265	1.00	1,241	0.95	
Total votes	126,867	100.00	130,224	100.00	
Registered voters/turnout	176,751	71.78	170,211	76.51	
Source: Haut Commissariat

=== 2013 ===
For the 2013 territorial elections, Chantal Florès-Tahiata was re-elected in the Austral Islands for the Union for Democracy (UPLD) coalition.

Party	First round		Second round		Seats	+/–
Party	Votes	%	Votes	%	Seats	+/–
Tahoera'a Huiraatira	51,316	40.16	62,340	45.11	38	28
Union for Democracy	30,781	24.09	40,441	29.26	11	–8
A Tia Porinetia	25,453	19.92	35,421	25.63	8	New
Other	20,218	15.82			0	N/A
Total	127,768	100.00	138,202	100.00	57	0
Valid votes	127,768	98.75	138,202	98.99		
Invalid/blank votes	1,621	1.25	1,412	1.01		
Total votes	129,389	100.00	139,614	100.00		
Registered voters/turnout	195,835	66.07	191,799	72.79		
Source: Tahiti Infos
