= Maamaatuaiahutapu =

Maamaatuaiahutapu is a surname. Notable people with the surname include:

- Heremoana Maamaatuaiahutapu (fl. 2010–present), French Polynesian politician
- Mateata Maamaatuaiahutapu (born 1968), French Polynesian journalist – the former's brother

== See also ==
- Maco Tevane (Marc Maamaatuaiahutapu, 1937–2013), French Polynesian writer and the siblings' father
