= Tea Frogier =

French Polynesian politician

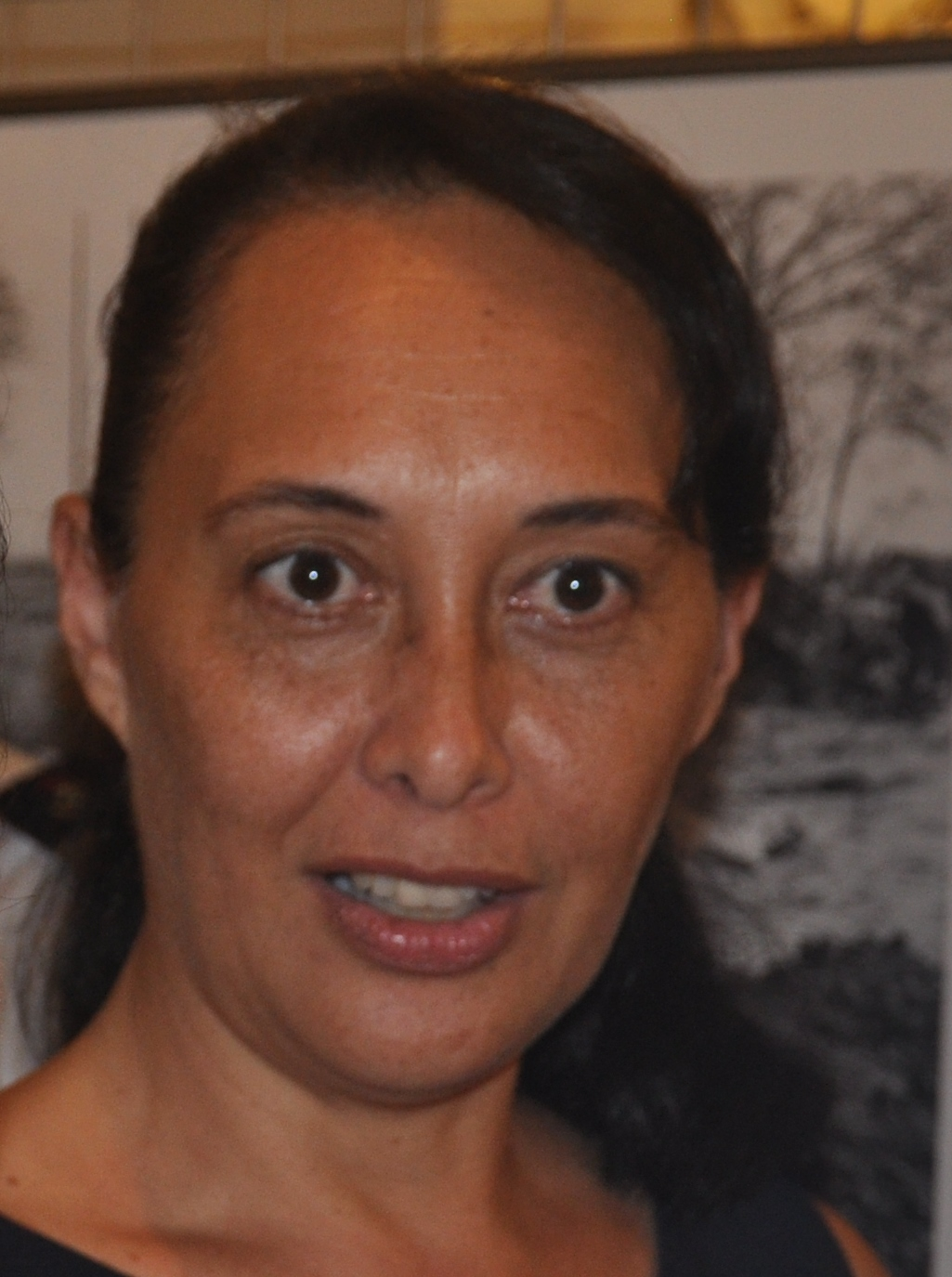
- Frogier in 2015

Minister for the Modernization of the Administration, in charge of Digital and Energy
- In office 24 May 2018 – 17 September 2020
- President: Édouard Fritch
- Preceded by: Jean-Christophe Bouissou
- Succeeded by: Christelle Lehartel (administration); Yvonnick Raffin (Energy)

Minister of Education
- In office 17 July 2017 – 23 May 2018
- Preceded by: Nicole Sanquer
- Succeeded by: Christelle Lehartel

Minister of Labour, Solidarity and the Status of Women
- In office 2 May 2015 – 23 May 2018
- Preceded by: Patrick Howell (Solidarity)
- Succeeded by: Nicole Bouteau

Minister of Labor and Social Dialogue, Employment, Vocational Training, Research and the Status of Women
- In office 16 September 2014 – 1 May 2015
- Preceded by: Nuihau Laurey (Labour); Manolita Ly (Employment, Status of Women); Tearii Alpha (Research)
- Succeeded by: Patrick Howell (Research)

Tea Priscille Frogier is a French Polynesian civil servant, politician and former Cabinet Minister. She is a member of Tapura Huiraatira.

== Early life ==
Frogier was educated at the University of Nice Sophia Antipolis, graduating in 1993 with a doctorate in organic chemistry. She worked as a technical adviser to the Ministry of the Environment before being appointed as head of the Research Delegation in 2000. She was the representative of French Polynesia on the national committee of the French Initiative for Coral Reefs (IFRECOR).

In July 2014 she was made a Knight of the Legion of Honour.

== Political career ==
In September 2014 she was appointed to Cabinet as Minister of Labor and Social Dialogue, Employment, Vocational Training, Research and the Status of Women in the government of Édouard Fritch. In March 2016 her appointment was annulled as she had not completed the stand-down period required of public servants, however she was immediately reappointed. Following the resignation of Nicole Sanquer in July 2017 she became Minister of Education. A cabinet reshuffle following the 2018 election saw her surrender the labour portfolio to Nicole Bouteau and take up responsibility as Modernization of the Administration, in charge of Digital and Energy.

In September 2020 she was dropped from the government in a cabinet reshuffle following the resignation of Teva Rohfritsch. In November 2020 she was reappointed as head of the Research Delegation.
