= Christelle Lehartel =

French Polynesian politician

Minister of Education
- In office 24 May 2018 – 15 May 2023
- President: Édouard Fritch
- Preceded by: Tea Frogier
- Succeeded by: Ronny Teriipaia

Minister for Modernisation of the Administration and Digital
- In office 17 September 2020 – 15 May 2023
- Preceded by: Tea Frogier
- Succeeded by: Vannina Crolas (modernization); Moetai Brotherson (digital economy)

Minister for Labour
- In office 10 November 2021 – 21 February 2022
- Preceded by: Nicole Bouteau
- Succeeded by: Virginie Bruant

Minister of Youth and Sport
- In office 24 May 2018 – 17 September 2020
- Succeeded by: Heremoana Maamaatuaiahutapu

Mayor of Papara
- In office 12 September 2014 – 26 October 2015
- Preceded by: Bruno Sandras
- Succeeded by: Putai Taae

Personal details
- Party: Tahoeraa Huiraatira; Tapura Huiraatira

Christelle Lehartel is a French Polynesian politician and former Cabinet Minister who served in the government of Édouard Fritch. She is a member of Tapura Huiraatira.

Lehartel has previously served as secretary of the Tahoeraa Huiraatira party. In September 2014, she was elected mayor of Papara following the removal from office of Bruno Sandras following his conviction for corruption. In July 2015, the Papara municipal elections were annulled by the French Council of State, and Lehartel lost the mayoralty to Putai Taae in the resulting by-election.

At the 2018 French Polynesian legislative election she ran as a candidate for the Tapura Huiraatira, but was not elected. Following the election she was appointed to the cabinet of Édouard Fritch as Minister of Education, Youth and Sports. Following the death of MP Jacquie Graffe she had the option of taking his vacant seat in the Assembly of French Polynesia as the next on the list, but chose instead to remain as a Minister. A cabinet reshuffle in September 2020 following the resignation of Teva Rohfritsch saw her surrender her Youth and Sport portfolio but gain responsibility for Modernization of the Administration and Digital. Following the resignation of Nicole Bouteau in November 2021 she also gained responsibility for Labour. A cabinet reshuffle in February 2022 saw her surrender the Labour portfolio to Virginie Bruant.
