= Musée de Tahiti et des Îles =

Coordinates: 17.6323°S 149.6139°W

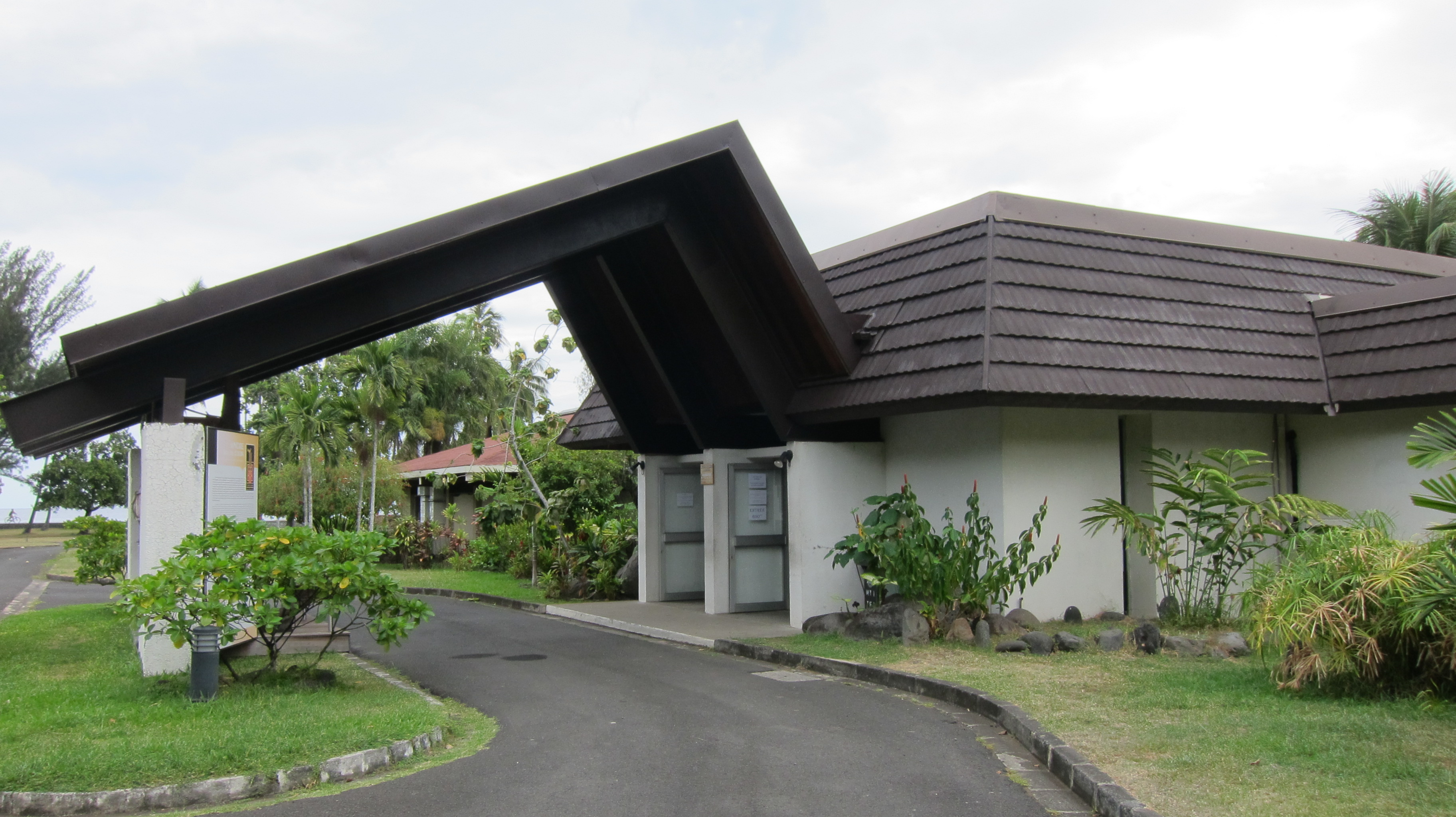

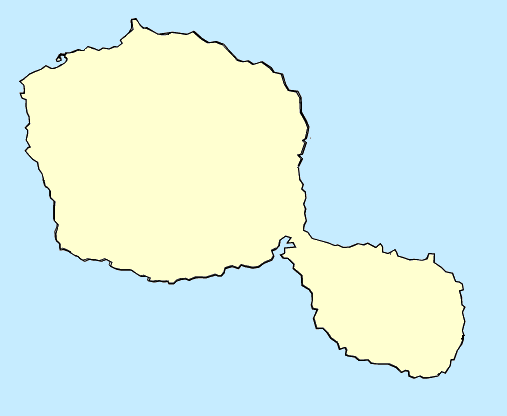
- Location within Tahiti
- Established: 1974
- Location: Puna'auia, Tahiti
- Type: Ethnographic museum
- Director: Miriama Bono
- Website: www.museetahiti.pf

The Musée de Tahiti et des Îles ("Museum of Tahiti and the Islands"), Tahitian Te Fare Manaha ("the Museum"), is the national museum of French Polynesia, located in Puna'auia, Tahiti.

== History ==
The museum was founded in 1974 to conserve and restore Polynesian artefacts and cultural practices. The museum was constructed on Nu'uroa Point, which was already a historic location having been the site of the Taputapuatea marae and where the first evangelical mission settled. It has signed cooperation agreements with the Musée du quai Branly.

The museum established a library in 1980.

In 2016 photovoltaic panels were installed on the roof of museum in order to generate its own electricity supply. In 2017 plans for renovation and redesign of the museum, drawn up by the architect Pierre-Jean Picart (fr), were approved. The museum closed to the public in 2019 and was re-opened in August 2022 with re-developed galleries.

== Engagement ==
In 2021 the museum opened the temporary Tahiti ti'a Mai exhibition, which focussed on Tahitian celebrations, due to the COVID-19 pandemic ran digital workshops which engaged with over 3000 visitors. The museum has curated displays of objects at Tahiti's airport.

Leading up to its opening in 2018 museum staff were part of a team that co-curated the British Museum exhibition Reimagining Captain Cook: Pacific Perspectives.

== Collection ==
The collection includes: objects that reflect the natural world, including a herbarium; life prior to European colonisation, and life post-colonization. Significant objects in the collection include: a portrait of Pōmare IV painted by Charles Giraud; a Mangarevan coconut-log mask; historic examples of tapa; adzes and coconut pounders; breadfruit tools; amongst others. The collection also includes objects originally collected by missionary George Bennet that have since been returned to Tahiti.

=== Gallery ===
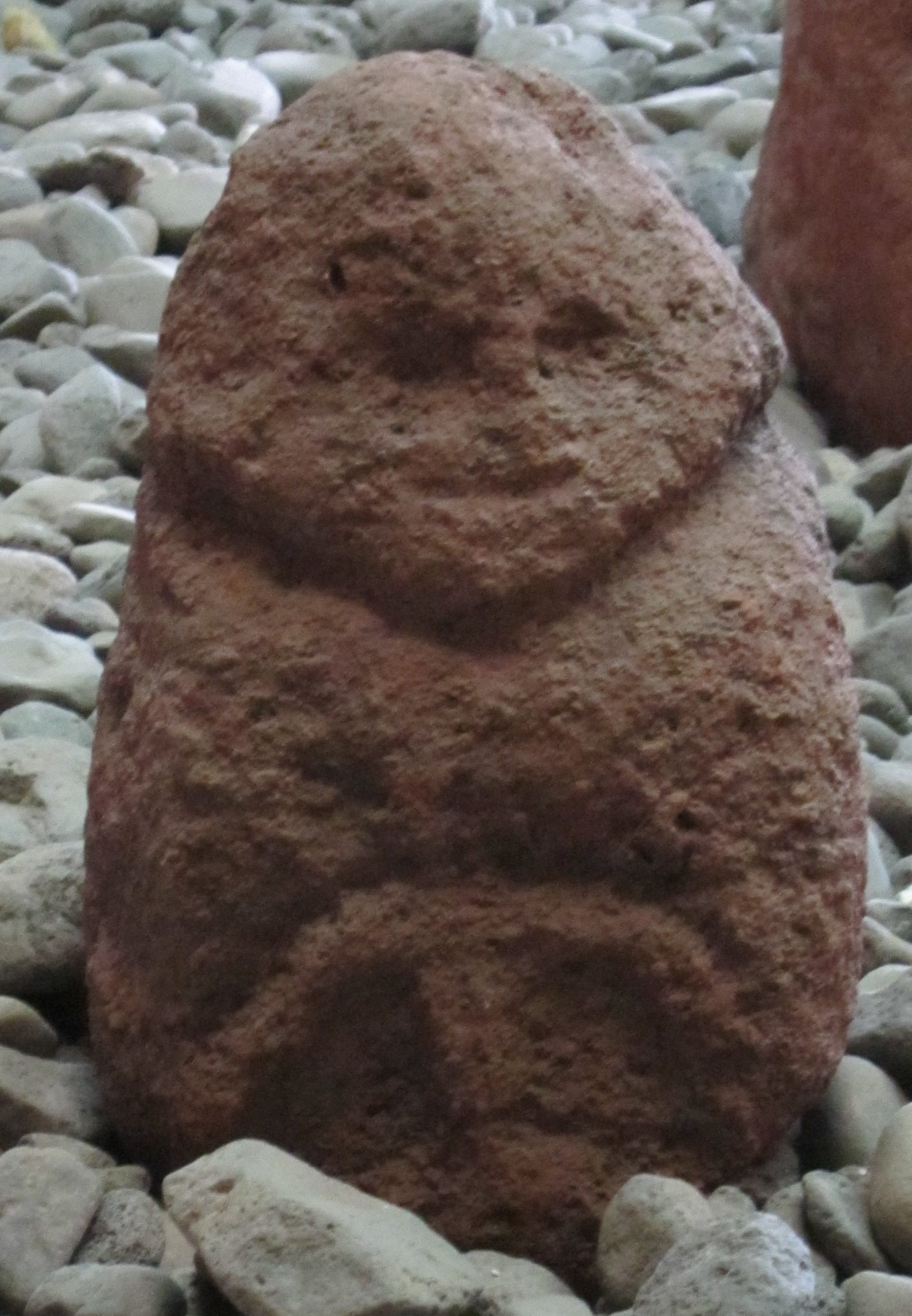
Human image, tuff, Society Islands, Musée de Tahiti et des Îles

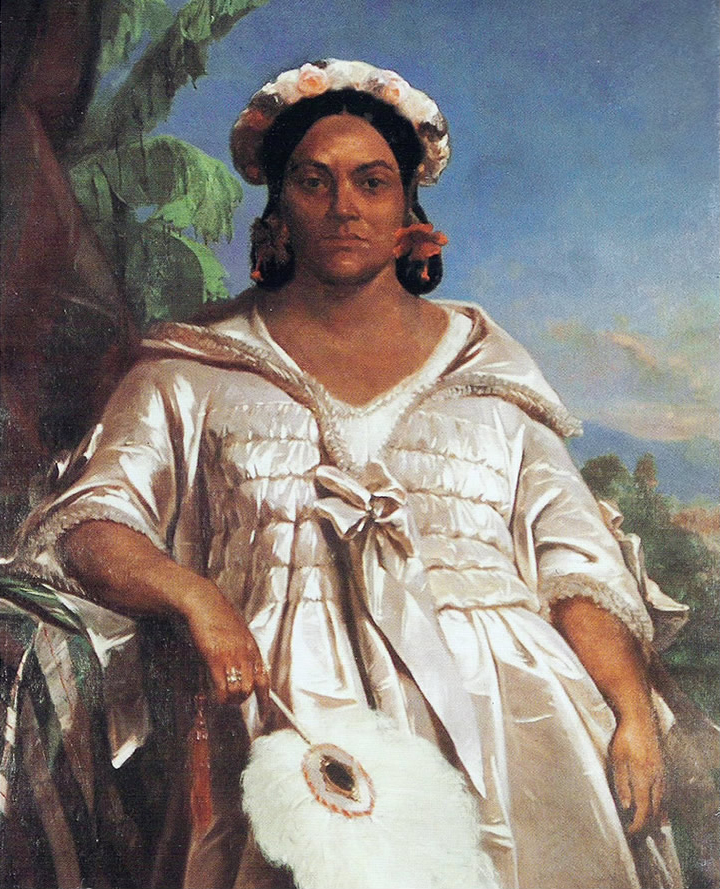
Portrait of Queen Pomare IV of Tahiti, Charles Giraud, 1851, Musée de Tahiti et des Îles

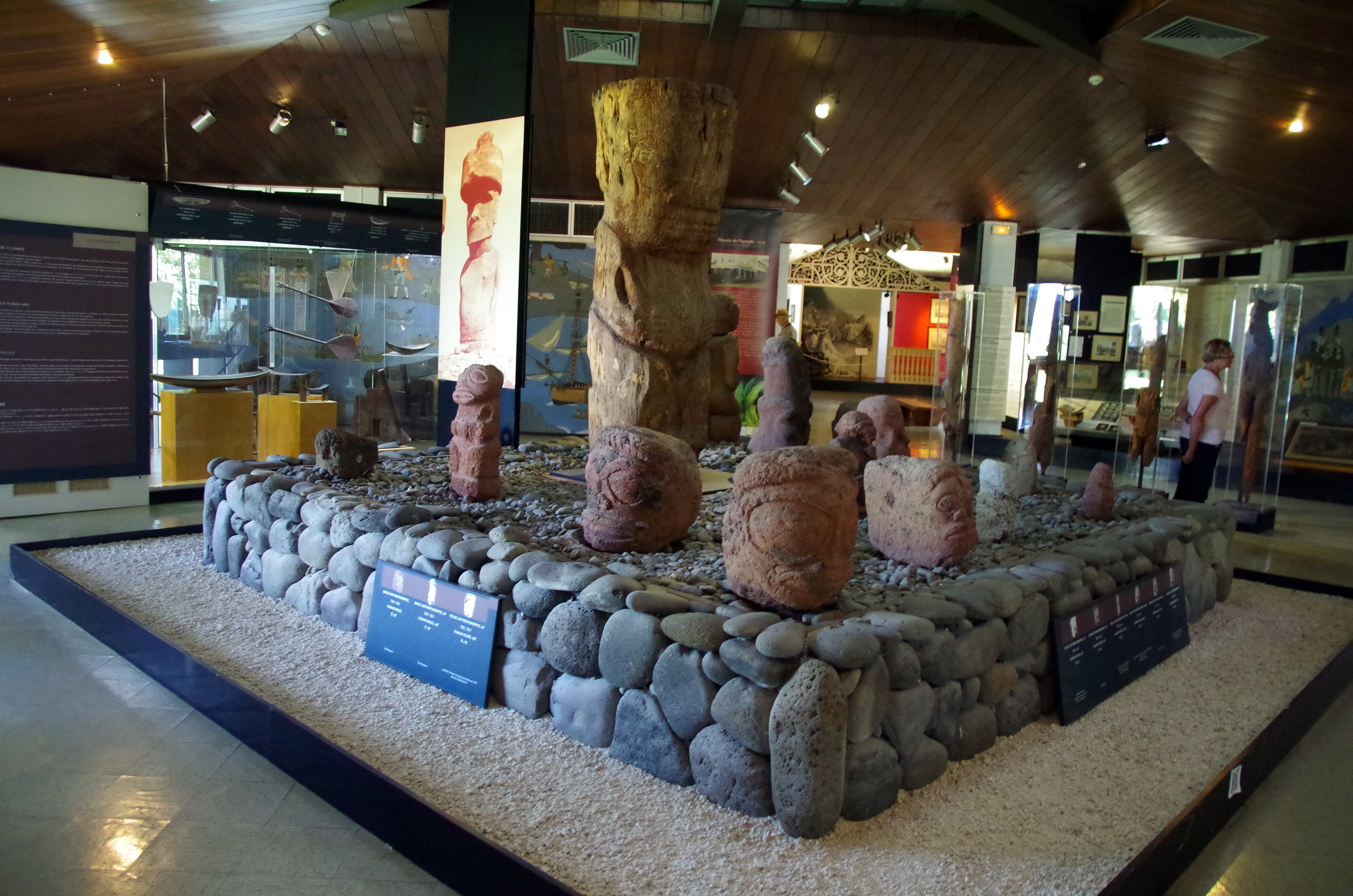
Displays at the museum, prior to renovation in 2017.

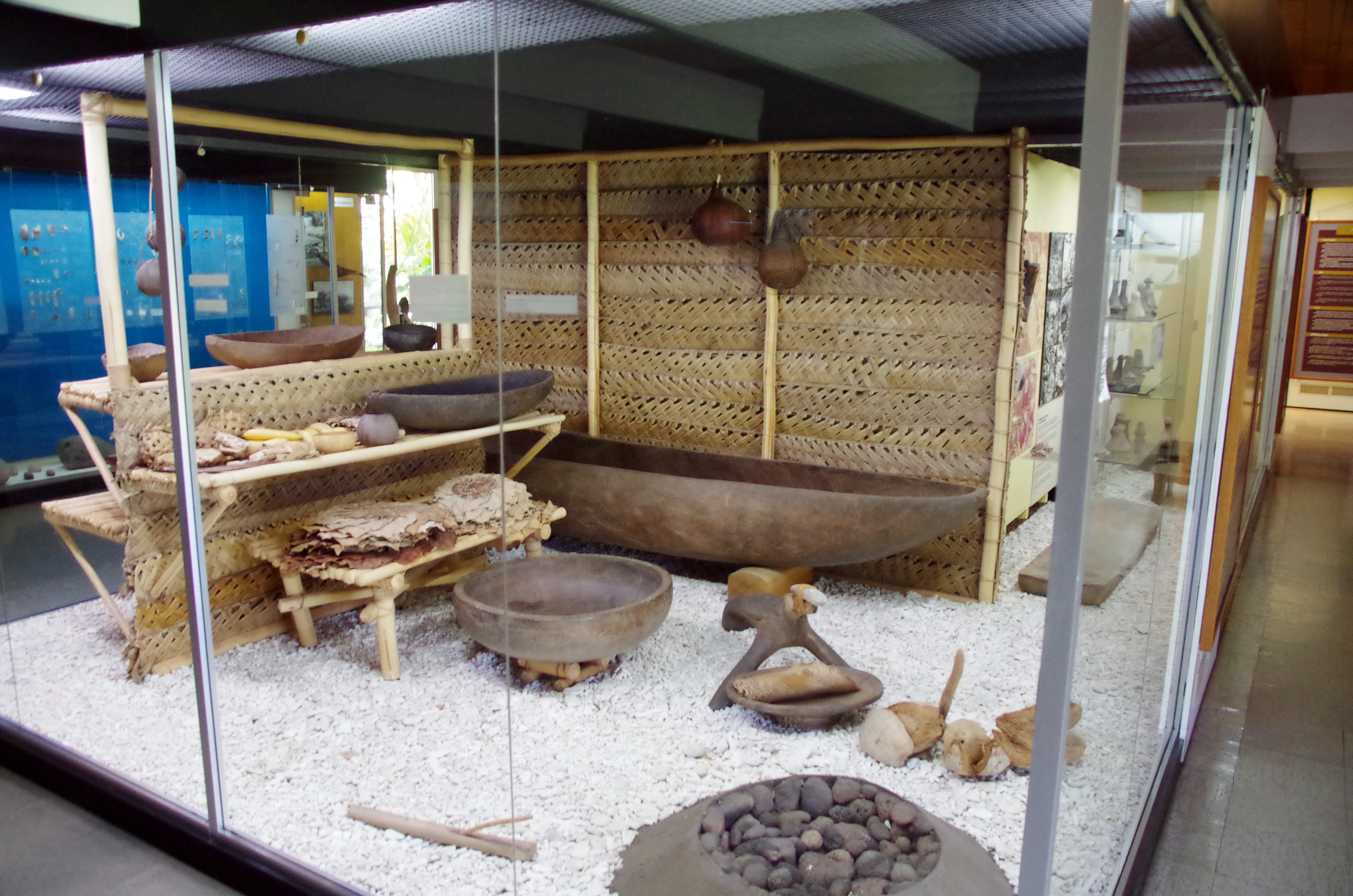
Museum display, prior to renovation in 2017.

=== Repatriation and loans ===
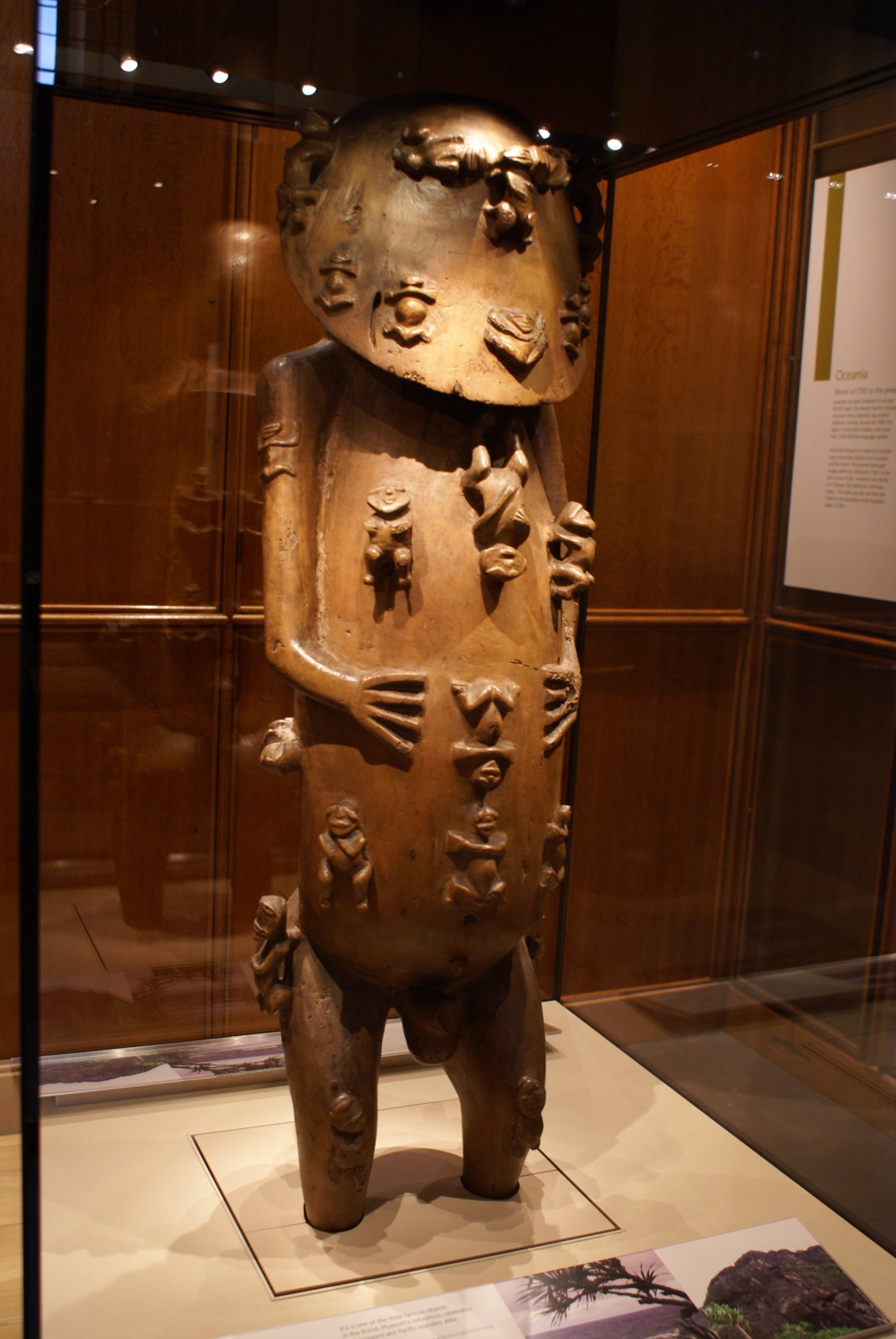
British Museum

In September 2019 the Director of the Musée du quai Branly, Emmanuel Kasarhérou, and the Minister for Culture in Polynesia, Heremoana Maamaatuaiahutapu, and the Director of Musée de Tahiti et des Îles, Miriama Bono, signed an agreement to ensure the return to Tahiti of the Maro'ura - a fragment of a chiefly belt made of tapa, that was born by chiefs and is considered a sacred object. The Maro'ura was worn by Tahitian king Pōmare, whose appearance with it was described by James Cook in 1767. Legally the Maro'ura will be loaned to the museum on a three-year renewable agreement, as, according to Bono, since "as we are a French, we cannot ask France to repatriate something back to France." Other objects that will also be loaned include a To'o mata and a Taavaha from the Marquesas Islands and a penu.

The museum has also requested the loan of objects from the British Museum and the Museum of Archaeology and Anthropology, Cambridge. Objects loaned from Cambridge will include objects collected by missionary George Bennet, including Tahitian pearl earrings, a fly swatter, a drum and a tattoo set. Objects due to be loaned from the British Museum include a chief's belt of Anaa, a taumi of the Society, a statue of Rongo des Gambier and the statue of A'a from Rurutu.

==== Gallery of objects in overseas collections ====
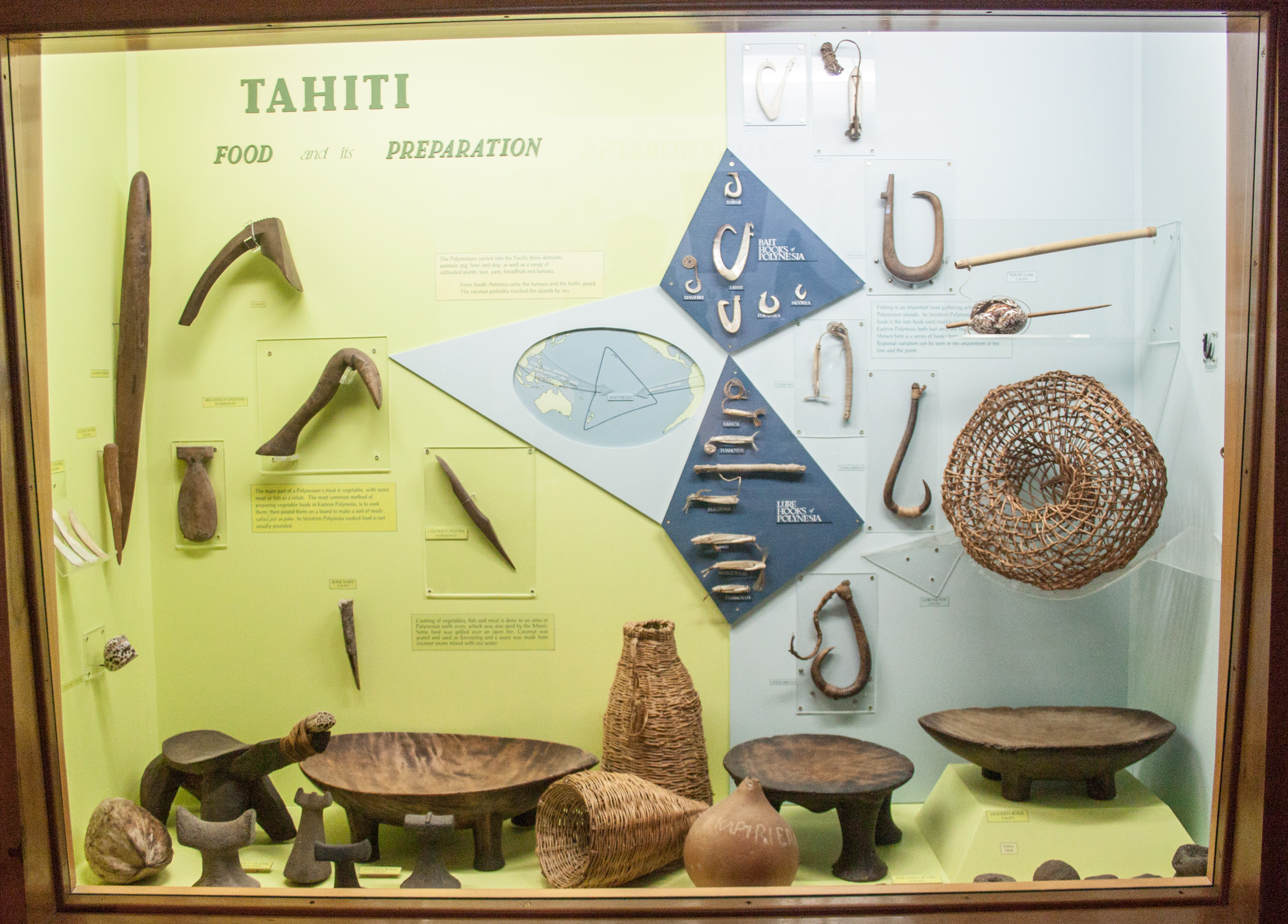
Objects in Otago Museum

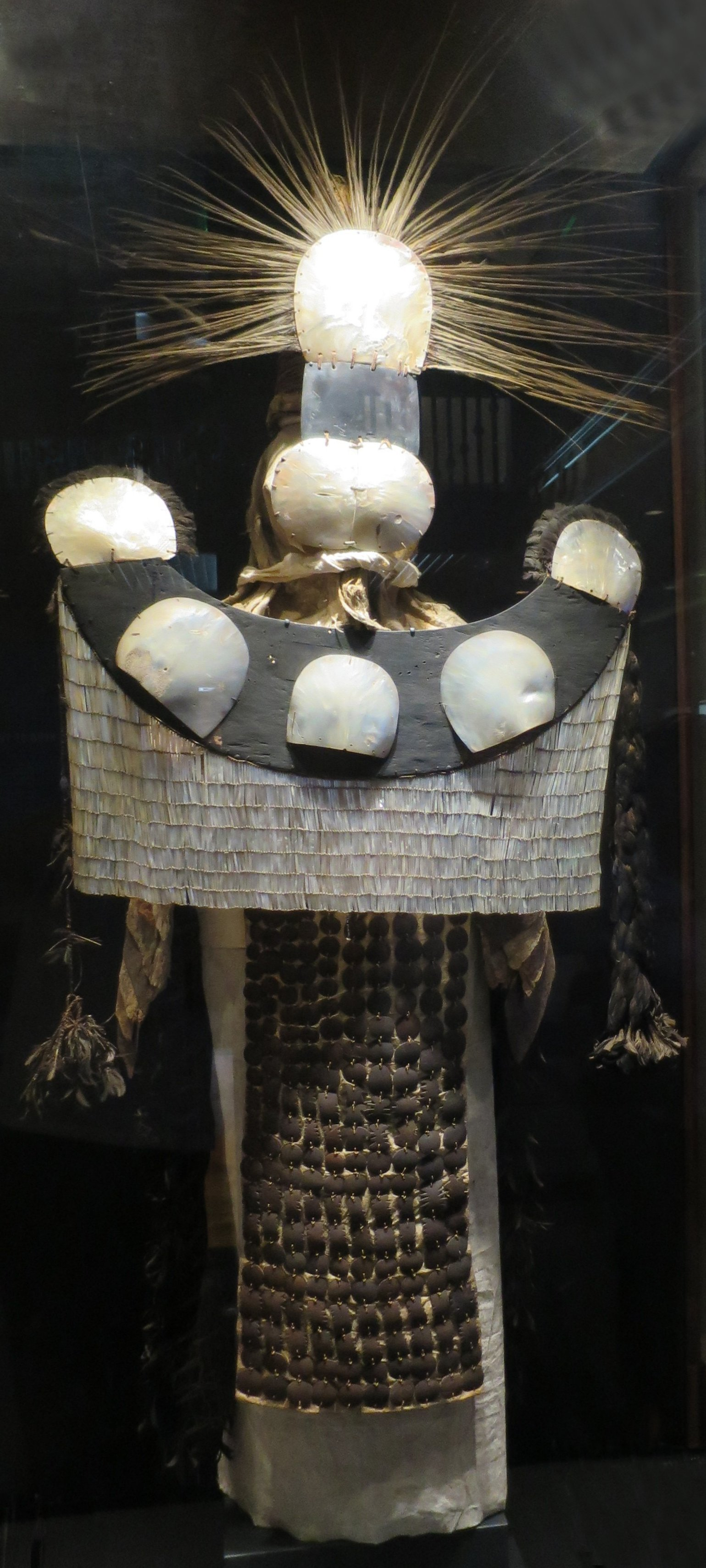
Chief mourner's costume, Tahiti, Society Islands, Bishop Museum

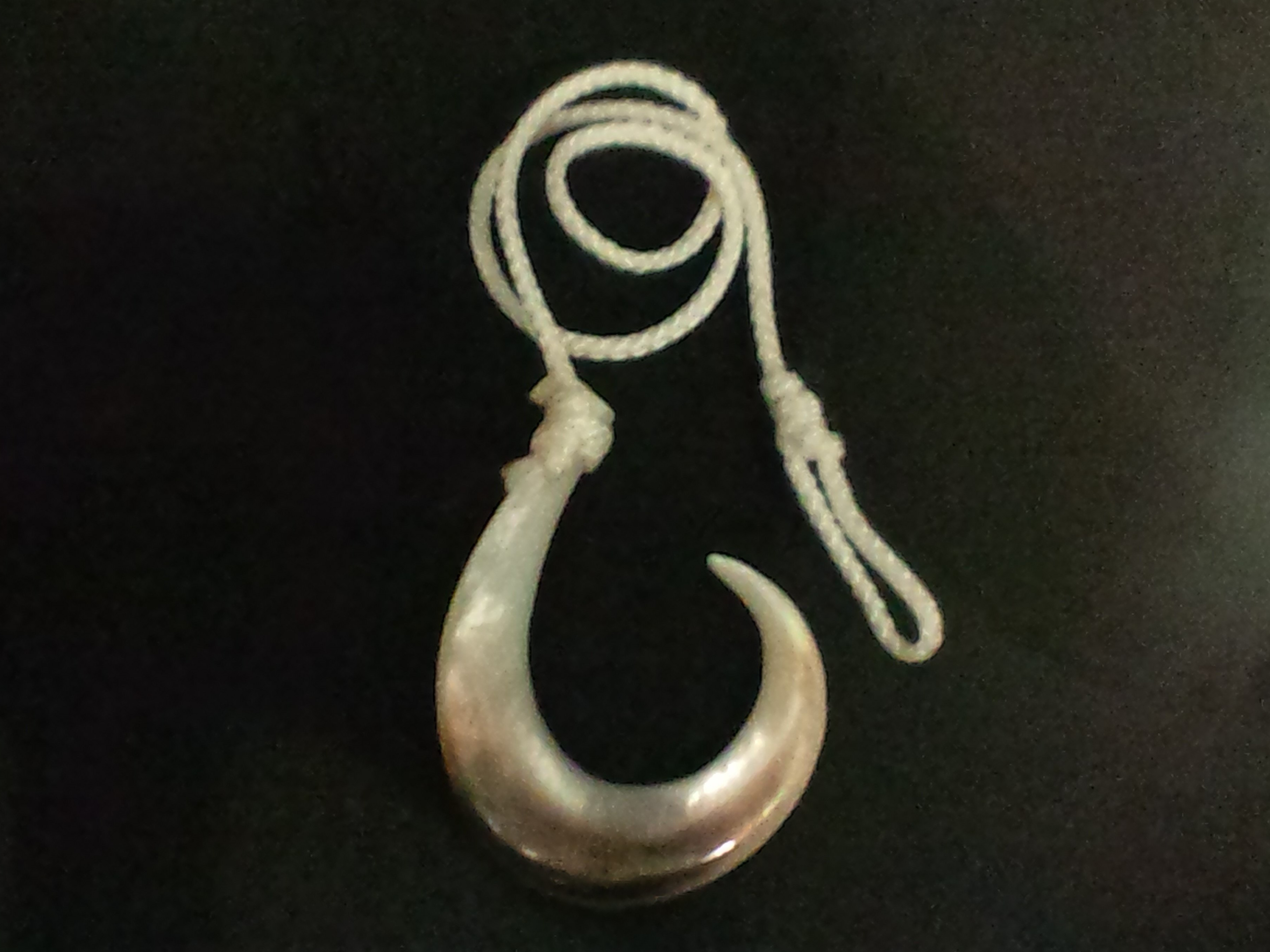
Fishhook, National Museum of Ethnology, Osaka

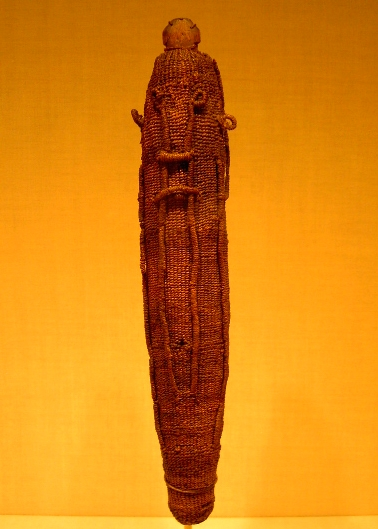
A sacred god figure wrapping for the war god 'Oro, Metropolitan Museum of Art

== Former directors ==
- Jean-Marc Pambrun
- Anne Lavondes
- Manouche Lehartel
- Théano Jaillet (2011 - 2016)
- Miriama Bono (2017–2023)
- Hinanui Cauchois (2023-present)
