= Pierre Frébault =

French Polynesian politician

Minister of Finance
- In office 5 April 2011 – 5 September 2012
- President: Oscar Temaru
- Succeeded by: Antony Géros

Minister of the Economy
- In office 5 April 2011 – 17 May 2013
- President: Oscar Temaru
- Succeeded by: Nuihau Laurey

Minister of Labour and Employment
- In office 5 April 2011 – 17 May 2013
- Succeeded by: Béatrice Chansin (Labour); Gaston Flosse (Employment)
- In office 18 February 2009 – 25 November 2009
- In office 29 January 2008 – 4 May 2013

Personal details
- Born: 27 October 1959 (age 66) Papeete, French Polynesia
- Party: Tavini Huiraatira

Pierre Frébault (born 27 October 1959) is a French Polynesian civil servant, politician, and former Cabinet Minister. He is a member of Tavini Huiraatira.

Frébault served as leader of the Confederation of Polynesian Workers' Unions (CSTP-FO) before entering politics. In 2005 he served as Labour Minister in the government of Oscar Temaru, and later in the government of Gaston Tong Sang.

In the 2007 French legislative election he was a Tavini candidate for French Polynesia's 2nd constituency, but lost to Bruno Sandras. He stood again as a candidate in the 2012 French legislative election.

He was elected to the Assembly of French Polynesia at the 2008 French Polynesian legislative election. Following the election he was briefly appointed to the short-lived cabinet of Gaston Flosse, then returned to the Assembly after the Flosse government's collapse. In February 2009 he was again appointed Minister of Labour and Employment in the coalition cabinet of Oscar Temaru. When Temaru regained power in April 2011 he was appointed Minister for the Economy, Finance, Labor and Employment. In September 2012 he was replaced as Finance Minister by Antony Géros, but retained his economy and labour portfolios. He lost his seat in the Assembly in the 2013 election.

In July 2017 he was appointed director of the Health and Social Regulation Agency (ARASS). In March 2022 he was dismissed as director after losing the confidence of Health Minister Jacques Raynal. He was subsequently appointed "interministerial delegate for local employment" by the Council of Ministers.
