= Tapura Amui No Te Faatereraa Manahune – Tuhaa Pae =

The Tapura Amui No Te Faatereraa Manahune – Tuhaa Pae was a short lived political coalition in French Polynesia for the 2004 French Polynesian legislative election, specifically for the Austral Islands. The coalition was between the parties of Tapura Amui no Tuhaa Pae, Union for the Democracy (Union pour la Démocratie), Heiura-Les Verts, and Fetia Api.

The coalition organised a political advertisement campaign for the 2004. The dates for broadcasts in 2004 took place at an unknown date, but occurred on the Austral Islands. All members of the coalition had separate broadcasts outside the coalition in 2004.

In the results, the coalition took 1 seat for the Austral Islands, electing Tapura Amui no Tuhaa Pae's Chantal Florès-Tahiata, who will sit on the UPLD group.

== See also ==
- List of political parties in French Polynesia
- Elections in French Polynesia
- Assembly of French Polynesia
- Politics of French Polynesia
