= No Oe E Te Nunaa =

Political party in French Polynesia

The No Oe E Te Nunaa (English: This Country is Yours) is a political party in French Polynesia. The party was established in April 2003 by former tourism minister Nicole Bouteau. The party supports autonomy for French Polynesia.

The party won six percent of the vote and a single seat at the 2004 French Polynesian legislative election. In the subsequent 2005 by-elections it was part of the Alliance for a New Democracy (Alliance pour une Démocratie Nouvelle), that won 3 out of 57 seats.

== See also ==
- List of political parties in French Polynesia
- Elections in French Polynesia
- Assembly of French Polynesia
- Politics of French Polynesia
