= Council of Ministers (French Polynesia) =

The Council of Ministers is the executive branch of the government of French Polynesia. It is headed and appointed by the President of French Polynesia.

== Brotherson 2023 cabinet ==
The current cabinet was appointed by Moetai Brotherson on 15 May 2023, following the 2023 election.

Portfolio	Minister	Party
President; Minister of Tourism, international air transport, and digital economy	Moetai Brotherson	Tāvini Huiraʻatira
Vice-president; Minister of Higher Education, Culture and the Environment, in charge of Relations with Institutions	Eliane Tevahitua	Tāvini Huiraʻatira
Minister of Public Service, Employment, and Labour	Vannina Crolas	Tāvini Huiraʻatira
Minister of Solidarity and Housing	Minarii Galenon-Taupua	Tāvini Huiraʻatira
Minister of Economy, Finance, and Energy	Tevaiti-Ariipaea Pomare	Tāvini Huiraʻatira
Minister for the Primary Sector, Research, and Food	Taivini Teai	Tāvini Huiraʻatira
Minister of Education	Ronny Teriipaia	Tāvini Huiraʻatira
Minister of Health	Cédric Mercadal	Tāvini Huiraʻatira
Minister of Youth and Sports	Nahema Temarii	Tāvini Huiraʻatira
Minister of Equipment and Land Transport	Jordy Chan	Tāvini Huiraʻatira

In addition Nathalie Heirani Salmon-Hudry was appointed Interminsterial Delegate for Disability.

== Fritch 2018 cabinet ==
Following the election of Édouard Fritch after the 2018 French Polynesian legislative election he appointed a cabinet on 24 May 2018. Six of the Ministers were appointed from the Assembly of French Polynesia, and as a result vacated their seats.

Portfolio	Minister	Party
Vice-president; Minister of Economy, Finance, Major Works and Blue Economy	Teva Rohfritsch	Tapura Huiraatira
Minister of Housing and Regional Planning, in charge of inter-island transport	Jean-Christophe Bouissou	Tapura Huiraatira
Minister of Tourism and Labour, in charge of Relations with Institutions	Nicole Bouteau	Tapura Huiraatira
Minister of Green Economy and Domain, in charge of Mines and Research	Tearii Alpha	Tapura Huiraatira
Minister for the Modernization of the Administration, in charge of Digital and Energy	Tea Frogier	Tapura Huiraatira
Minister of Culture and the Environment, in charge of Handicrafts	Heremoana Maamaatuaiahutapu	Tapura Huiraatira
Minister of Family and Solidarity, in charge of Equal Opportunities	Isabelle Sachet	Tapura Huiraatira
Minister of Health and Prevention, in charge of Generalized Social Protection	Jacques Raynal	Tapura Huiraatira
Minister of Education; Minister of Youth and Sports	Christelle Lehartel	Tapura Huiraatira
Minister of Major Works and Land Transport	René Temeharo	Tapura Huiraatira

In September 2020 the council was reshuffled following the resignation of Teva Rohfritsch. Tearii Alpha was appointed vice-president and minister of Agriculture, Blue Economy and Industry, Tea Frogier was dropped as a Minister, and Yvonnick Raffin was appointed finance minister. A further reshuffle took place in November 2021 when Alpha was fired as vice-president after refusing to comply with the territory's mandatory vaccination law. He was replaced as vice-president by Jean-Christophe Bouissou, but retained his other portfolios, resulting in Nicole Bouteau resigning from Cabinet in protest. Her portfolios were shared out among other ministers.

A further reshuffle in February 2022 saw Isabelle Sachet leave the Cabinet, and Virginie Bruant and Naea Bennett join it. Bruant became Minister of Labour, Solidarity, Training, Status of Women, Family and Non-autonomous Persons, while Bennett gained responsibility for Youth, Crime Prevention and Sports.

== Fritch 2014 Cabinet ==
Following the removal of Gaston Flosse from office Édouard Fritch appointed his first cabinet in September 2014.

Portfolio	Minister	Party
Vice-president; Minister of Economy, Finance, Civil Service and Energy	Nuihau Laurey	Tapura Huiraatira
Minister for Economic Recovery, Tourism and International Transport, Industry, Trade, and Business	Jean-Christophe Bouissou	Tapura Huiraatira
Minister for the Development of Activities in the Primary Sector	Frédéric Riveta	Tapura Huiraatira
Minister of Labor and Social Dialogue, Employment, Vocational Training, Research and the Status of Women	Tea Frogier	Tapura Huiraatira
Minister of Housing and Urban Renewal, City Policy, Land Affairs and Domain	Tearii Alpha	Tapura Huiraatira
Minister of Education and Higher Education	Nicole Sanquer	Tapura Huiraatira
Minister of Youth and Sports	René Temeharo	Tapura Huiraatira
Minister of Health and Solidarity	Patrick Howell	Tapura Huiraatira
Minister of Equipment, Planning and Urban Planning and Internal Transport	Albert Solia	Tapura Huiraatira
Minister of Language Promotion, Culture, Communication and the Environment	Heremoana Maamaatuaiahutapu	Tapura Huiraatira

A reshuffle on 27 May 2015 saw Teva Rohfritsch join the cabinet as Minister for Economic Recovery, Blue Economy and Digital. On 8 October 2015 René Temeharo and Frédéric Riveta resigned from Cabinet in order to return to the Assembly and strengthen Fritch's majority. Nicole Sanquer replaced Temeharo as Minister of Youth and Sport, while Fritch took over the agriculture portfolio. A further reshuffle in January 2017 saw Nicole Bouteau replace Jean-Christophe Bouissou as Minister of Tourism, Jacques Raynal replace Patrick Howell as Minister of Health and Solidarity, and Luc Faatau replace Albert Solia as Minister of Equipment. Following the resignation of Nicole Sanquer in July 2017 Tea Frogier replaced her as Minister of Education.

== Flosse 2013 cabinet ==
Gaston Flosse was elected president following the 2013 election, and appointed a Cabinet of 8 Ministers on 17 May 2013.

Portfolio	Minister	Party
President; Minister of Solidarity and Employment	Gaston Flosse	Tahoera'a Huiraatira
Vice-president; Minister of Economy, Finance, Civil Service, Business and Industry	Nuihau Laurey	Tahoera'a Huiraatira
Minister of Tourism, Ecology, Culture, Planning and Air Transport	Geffry Salmon	Tahoera'a Huiraatira
Minister of Marine Resources, Mines, and Fisheries	Tearii Alpha	Tahoera'a Huiraatira
Minister of Housing, Land, Digital Economy and Communication	Marcel Tuihani	Tahoera'a Huiraatira
Minister of Health, Labour, and Women's Rights	Béatrice Chansin	Tahoera'a Huiraatira
Minister of Education, Youth and Sports	Michel Leboucher	Tahoera'a Huiraatira
Minister of Equipment, Planning, Energy and Transport	Bruno Marty	Tahoera'a Huiraatira
Minister of Agriculture and Island Development	Thomas Moutame	Tahoera'a Huiraatira

A reshuffle in November 2013 saw Albert Solia replace Bruno Marty as Minister of Equipment and Transport, and Manolita Ly enter cabinet as the new Minister of Solidarity, Employment, and Women's Rights. Flosse took over the Energy portfolio, while Nuihau Laurey took over the Labour portfolio from Béatrice Chansin.

== Temaru 2011 Cabinet ==
Oscar Temaru was elected following a confidence vote in April 2011 and appointed a cabinet on 5 April 2011. The government stayed in power until the 2013 election.

Portfolio	Minister	Party
President; Minister of Tourism	Oscar Temaru	Tavini Huiraatira
Vice-president; Minister of community development, digital economy, communication	Antony Géros	Tavini Huiraatira
Minister for the Economy, Finance, Labor and Employment	Pierre Frébault	Tavini Huiraatira
Minister of Equipment and Land Transport	James Salmon	Tavini Huiraatira
Minister of Marine Resources	Temauri Foster	Tavini Huiraatira
Minister of Education, Youth and Sports	Tauhiti Nena	Tavini Huiraatira
Minister for Development and Housing	Louis Frébault	Tavini Huiraatira
Minister for the Environment, Energy and Mines	Jacky Bryant	Tavini Huiraatira
Minister for Health and Solidarity	Charles Tetaria	Tavini Huiraatira
Minister of Culture, Handicrafts and the Family, in charge of Women's Affairs	Chantal Tahiata	Tavini Huiraatira
Minister of Agriculture	Kalani Teixeira	Tavini Huiraatira
Minister for island development and inter-island transport	Daniel Herlemme	Tavini Huiraatira

Antony Géros replaced Pierre Frébault as Minister of Finance in September 2012.
