= Léontieff =

Léontieff is a French Polynesian surname. Notable people with the surname include:

- Alexandre Léontieff (1948–2009), French politician, third President of French Polynesia
- Boris Léontieff (1955–2002), French Polynesian politician
