= 2004 French Polynesian legislative election =

← 2001	23 May 2004	2008 →
- All 57 seats in the Territorial Assembly; 29 seats needed for a majority
Party	Leader	Seats	+/–
Tahoera'a Huiraatira	Gaston Flosse	28	0
TH–AA–HA–TANTFMTP–TANR	Oscar Temaru	26	+13
Fetia Api	Philip Schyle	1	−6
No Oe E Te Nunaa	Nicole Bouteau	1	New
Tapura Amui		1	New
This lists parties that won seats. See the complete results below.

Legislative elections were held in French Polynesia on 23 May 2004 to elect members of the Assembly.

In a surprise result Oscar Temaru's pro-independence progressive coalition formed Government with a one-seat majority in the 57 seat parliament, defeating the conservative party led by Gaston Flosse (see also List of political parties in French Polynesia). On October 8, 2004, the Gaston Flosse led opposition party succeeded in passing a censure motion against the Government. This provoked a political crisis, and controversy about whether the national government of France should use its exceptional power to call for new elections in a local government, in case of a grave political crisis.

== Timeline ==
23 May 2004: Elections for the Assembly of French Polynesia (Assemblée de la Polynésie française), the territorial assembly of French Polynesia, held. A progressive coalition led by pro-independence Oscar Temaru wins 26 (27 respectively) seats and forms a coalition with 3 (2 respectively) autonomist members to form a Government with a majority of one (see also List of political parties in French Polynesia). The conservative party led by Gaston Flosse has 28 seats.

10 June 2004: Former President, Gaston Flosse, and his conservative party, Tahoeraa Huiraatira, stayed away from the presidential (Le président de la Polynésie française) election, thus invalidating it, as a three-fifths quorum was required. He subsequently lost one defector to Oscar Temaru.

14 June 2004: Oscar Temaru elected President (Le président de la Polynésie française) (when a simple majority quorum was required), gaining 30 out of 57 votes.

5 October 2004: Two motions of censure tabled in the Assembly of French Polynesia (Assemblée de la Polynésie française). One from Gaston Flosse's Tahoeraa Huiraatira party, and one from a new group, Te Ara, that includes three former members of Flosse’s party.

9 October 2004: A motion of censure tabled by the conservative Tahoeraa Huiraatira, was adopted by 29 votes out of 57. The motion was proposed by opposition leader Gaston Flosse after Oscar Temaru ordered an audit of the previous government, which was led by Gaston Flosse. A second censure motion was not voted upon.

12 October 2004: Tahoeraa Huiraatira, endorses its President, Gaston Flosse, as its official candidate for the Presidency in the French administered territory of French Polynesia (Le président de la Polynésie française).

The President of the Assembly of French Polynesia (Le président de l'Assemblée de la Polynésie française), Antony Géros, from Oscar Temaru's coalition government, insisted that the parliament should meet on October 25 to elect a new government president (Le président de la Polynésie française). However, this date was against the advice of the French High Commissioner of the Republic in French Polynesia (Le Haut-Commissaire de la République en Polynésie française) Michel Mathieu who stated in written letters that the Assembly of French Polynesia (Assemblée de la Polynésie française) is required to vote on a new government president (Le président de la Polynésie française) within 15 days of the passage of a censure motion. The third Vice president of the Assembly of French Polynesia, Lana Tetuanui from Gaston Flosse’s party, called for the Assembly to sit on October 20, 2004.

15 October 2004: Second request by Oscar Temaru for fresh elections denied by French minister for overseas Territories (la Ministre de l’Outre-mer) Brigitte Girardin.

16 October 2004: More than 20,000 people march through Papeete on Tahiti, the main island of French Polynesia, in support of Oscar Temaru demanding new elections. Demonstrations also occur across French Polynesia.

19 October 2004: French Polynesia’s caretaker government president, Oscar Temaru, has asked the Papeete administrative court (Le Tribunal administratif de la Polynésie française) to suspend, then cancel the October 9 adopted censure motion.

20 October 2004: The Assembly of French Polynesia meets, but is unable to elect a new president (Le président de la Polynésie française) as there is not a required quorum in attendance due to a boycott of members supporting Oscar Temaru.

22 October 2004: The Assembly of French Polynesia meets to elect President (Le président de la Polynésie française). Simple Majority required. Gaston Flosse was re-elected (Le président de la Polynésie française) by a one-vote majority and sworn in immediately during a parliamentary session boycotted by caretaker President Oscar Temaru. The parliament elected Flosse with 29 of 57 votes; the 28 pro-independence members boycotted the vote.

Antony Géros, the president of the Assembly of French Polynesia (Le président de l'Assemblée de la Polynésie française), did not participate in Friday’s session, and also described Flosse’s election Friday as an "election of the president of the Tahoeraa Huiraatira", which is a reference to Flosse’s pro-autonomy and anti-independence party. Geros said that Monday, October 25, is the only legitimate date for the parliament to elect a government president following the censure motion.

23 October 2004: a Council of State (French national supreme administrative court) judge rejected two petitions from Tahiti to suspend the October 9 censure motion that toppled French Polynesia President (Le président de la Polynésie française) Oscar Temaru’s majority coalition government.

26 October 2004: Tensions remain high in French Polynesia as the Leadership remains in doubt. The Legislative Assembly failed to sit on Monday, October 25. Assembly Speaker (Le président de l'Assemblée de la Polynésie française), Antony Géros, failed to turn up and chair the sitting he himself had scheduled. Gaston Flosse, who was elected President (Le président de la Polynésie française) by an assembly sitting on October 22, attempted to enter the Presidential palace on the weekend but was met by closed gates.

15 November 2004: The Council of State, judging on a request from Gaston Flosse, cancels the May elections in the Windward Islands-circonscription (French: la circonscription des Îles du Vent) for the reason that the neutrality of election officials was not observed in one of the communes, which, given the small difference of vote counts, may have altered the electoral results.

13 February 2005: By-elections for the Assembly of French Polynesia are held in the Windward Islands-circumscription (French: la circonscription des Îles du Vent) The pro-independence-coalition wins 30 seats: Part of the pro-independence-coalition is the Union for the Democracy (Union pour la Démocratie) with Oscar Temaru's Tavini Huiraatira (People's servant) which wins 27 seats and the Alliance for a New Democracy (Alliance pour une Démocratie Nouvelle) which wins 3 seats. The Conservative coalition (consisting of one party only), the pro-autonomy, anti-independence Tahoera'a Huiraatira (Popular Rally), wins only 27 seats.

3 March 2005: Oscar Temaru elected President of French Polynesia (Le président de la Polynésie française) for the second time.

== Results ==
Party	Seats
Tahoera'a Huiraatira	28
Union for the Democracy (TH–AA–HA–TANTFMTP–TANR)	26
Fetia Api	1
No Oe E Te Nunaa	1
Tapura Amui no Tuhaa Pae	1
Total	57
Source: Assembly
