= Fetia Api =

French Polynesian political party (1996–2016)

The Fetia Api or Nouvelle Étoile (English: New Star) was a centre-right political party in French Polynesia from 1996 to 2016, advocating for the autonomy of French Polynesia. The party was led by Boris Léontieff, former mayor of Arue since 1989, and then subsequently led by Philip Schyle after 2002.

The party was once one of the oldest in French Polynesia, spanning over 20 years. Originally the party was first associated with the French Union for French Democracy (UDF) party, but in 2007 it was part of dissidents who split away from the UDF and created the New Centre (NC). Philip Schyle was elected the Foreign Minister for the NC, and Fetia Api helped with public financial contributions.

In 2016, the party was dissolved, with the members becoming part of the newly formed Tapura Huiraatira (TAPURA) party.

== History ==
=== 1996 election ===
In the territorial elections of 1996 in French Polynesia, Boris Léontieff was elected to French Polynesian Assembly as an independent.

=== 2001 elections ===
In the 2001 territorial elections, 7 members were elected.

| Candidate name | Constituency |
|---|---|
| Boris Léontieff | Windward Islands |
| Thilda Fuller | Windward Islands |
| Antonio Perez | Windward Islands |
| Arsen Tuairau | Windward Islands |
| Marie-Laure Vanizette | Windward Islands |
| Pierre Amiot | Leeward Islands |
| Lucien Kimitete ( Te Henua Enana Kotoa ) | Marquesas Islands |

=== 2002 plane crash ===
On 24 May 2002 a light plane carrying party leader Boris Léontieff, officials of Lucien Kimitete and Arsen Tuairau, and substitute candidate Ferfine Besseyre, disappeared on a flight to Makemo in the Tuamotus. The French colonial government refused to delay the elections.

=== 2003 president ===
Philip Schyle is elected as the president of the Fetia Api party.

=== 2004 election ===
At the 2004 election the party contested with its own list winning one seat on Windward Islands, electing Philip Schyle. The party was also part of the Tapura Amui No Te Faatereraa Manahune – Tuhaa Pae coalition during this election for the seats on the Austral Islands, as well as part of the Tapura Amui no Raromatai coalition for the Leeward Islands. For the Leeward islands, the party's Patricia Jennings-Pahio was elected.

Following the 2004 elections, the party held the balance of power, and sided with pro-independence leader Oscar Temaru. In the 10 member government, two Fetia Api members were elected. They were Marie-Laure Vanizette and Francis Stein.

Antonio Perez dissidents to create the rival Te Avei'a party.

=== 2005 partial election ===
Following the collapse of Temaru's government, the party united with Nicole Bouteau to contest the 2005 Partial French Polynesian Election as the Alliance for a New Democracy (ADN), with party president Philip Schyle re-elected in the constituency of the Windward Islands. The party did not join the subsequent Temaru government.

=== 2006 and after ===
In 2006 the party's leader Philip Schyle elected President of the Assembly of French Polynesia with the surprise support of Tahoeraa by 29 votes against 28 for outgoing President Tony Geros (UPLD - Tavini). He was elected for a second term in 2009.

In 2007 the party leader Philip Schyle was assigned as Foreign Minister for the French party New Centre (NC).

In the 2008 election the party ran on a common list with O Porinetia To Tatou Ai'a and other small autonomist parties called "To Tātou ‘Ai‘a" (Homeland for us all).

In 2012, Philip Schyle and so the Fetia Api party become members of the short lived Rassemblement pour une Alternative Progressiste (RAP) coalition.

In 2016, the party was dissolved, with the members becoming part of the newly formed Tapura Huiraatira (TAPURA) party.
