= Jacques Raynal =

French Polynesian politician

Minister of Health and Prevention
- In office 13 January 2017 – 15 May 2023
- President: Édouard Fritch
- Preceded by: Patrick Howell
- Succeeded by: Cédric Mercadal

Minister of Solidarity
- In office 13 January 2017 – 24 May 2018
- Preceded by: Patrick Howell
- Succeeded by: Isabelle Sachet

Personal details
- Party: Tahoera'a Huiraatira; Tapura Huiraatira

Jacques Raynal is a French Polynesian politician and former Cabinet Minister who has served in the governments of Gaston Flosse and Édouard Fritch. He is a member of Tapura Huiraatira.

Raynal is a doctor. He was appointed as Minister of Health in the coalition cabinet of Oscar Temaru in February 2009. In April 2009 he quit the Tahoera'a Huiraatira party.

He was appointed to the cabinet of Édouard Fritch as Minister of Health and Solidarity in January 2017, replacing Patrick Howell. He was reappointed to the Health portfolio following the 2018 French Polynesian legislative election in May 2018. As Health Minister he introduced a Sugary drink tax to counter diabetes. He also oversaw French Polynesia's response to the COVID-19 pandemic.
