= Jean-Marc Pambrun =

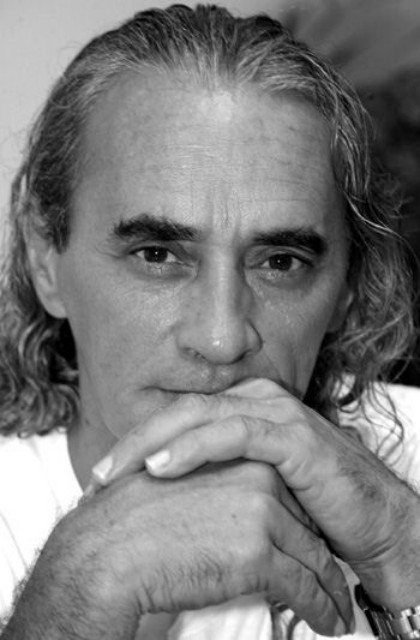
Image of Jean-Marc Tera'ituatini Pambrun

Jean-Marc Tera'ituatini Pambrun (22 December 1953 – 12 February 2011) was an anthropologist, who was one of the most controversial Polynesian intellectuals of his generation.

== Life ==
Son of a Polynesian from Raiatea, he spent his entire career in the Polynesian cultural field: director of the traditions department (1983-1992), head of the culture department of the town hall of Faa'a, director of the house of the culture of Papeete, twice advisor to the local government, then finally director of the Museum of Tahiti and the Islands from August 2005 until his death in Créteil on 12 February 2011.

Jean-Marc Pambrun is the author of numerous works, novels and plays. He has also made a few documentary films.
