= Tevaiti-Ariipaea Pomare =

French Polynesian politician

Minister of Finance and Economy
- Incumbent
- Assumed office 15 May 2023
- President: Moetai Brotherson
- Preceded by: Yvonnick Raffin

Minister of Energy
- Incumbent
- Assumed office 15 May 2023
- Preceded by: Yvonnick Raffin

Personal details
- Born: 1976 or 1977 (age 48–49) Pirae, French Polynesia
- Party: A here ia Porinetia

Tevaiti-Ariipaea Pomare (born 1976 or 1977) is a French Polynesian actuary, civil servant, politician, and Cabinet Minister.

Pomare was born in Pirae. He studied in France at ENSAE Paris and the Institute of Financial Science and Insurance, and then worked at the Bank of France, KPMG and Winter & Associates as an actuary. In 2014 he returned to French Polynesia, where he worked for social welfare agency Caisse de Prévoyance Sociale. In 2020 he became a consultant.

In the 2023 election campaign, Pomare was an activist for A here ia Porinetia. Despite this, on 15 May 2023 he was appointed Minister of Economy, Finance, and Energy in the Tāvini Huiraʻatira government of Moetai Brotherson.
