= Tuarii Tracqui =

French actor and dancer

Tuarii Tracqui (born 1991) is a French Polynesian actor and dancer. He is the son of dance expert Manouche Lehartel.

Tracqui was born in Tahiti. He began dancing at the age of 15 after the death of his father. In 2008 he enrolled in the Artistic Conservatory of French Polynesia, graduating with a diploma of traditional studies, and winning a gold medal in dance. He then studied Tahitian language at the University of French Polynesia. He won best dancer at the 2012 Heiva, and served on the jury for the 2016 Heiva a Paris. In 2015 he started acting, on stage in Les champignons de Paris, and on television in Tupapa'u and the short comedy series Maui and Coco. He also worked as a choreographer on the TV show "Dance in paradise".
