= Vannina Crolas =

French Polynesian politician

Minister of Public Services and Modernisation of Administration
- Incumbent
- Assumed office 15 May 2023
- President: Moetai Brotherson
- Preceded by: Christelle Lehartel

Minister of Employment and Labour
- Incumbent
- Assumed office 15 May 2023
- Preceded by: Virginie Bruant

Personal details
- Born: 1966 or 1967 (age 58–59)
- Party: Tāvini Huiraʻatira

Vannina Crolas (born 1966 or 1967) is a French Polynesian politician and Cabinet Minister. She is a member of Tāvini Huiraʻatira.

Crolas trained as a lawyer, then worked for the Office of Posts and Telecommunications for eight years, before moving to the Faʻaʻā town administration in 2002. She was town secretary, and then as deputy director of general services. In June 2019 she was appointed general secretary of the Tāvini Huiraʻatira party, succeeding Etienne Chimin. She offered her resignation as general secretary in the leadup to the 2023 French Polynesian legislative election following disputes within the party over the choice of Moetai Brotherson as the party's presidential candidate and the removal of Eliane Tevahitua from the party list in favour of Maurea Maamaatuaiahutapu.

On 15 May 2023 she was appointed Minister of Public Services, Employment, Labour, and Modernisation of Administration in the government of Moetai Brotherson.
