= 2001 French Polynesian legislative election =

← 1996	6 May 2001	2004 →
- All 49 seats in the Territorial Assembly; 25 seats needed for a majority
Party	Leader	Seats	+/–
Tāhōʻēraʻa Huiraʻatira	Gaston Flosse	28	+6
Tāvini Huiraʻatira	Oscar Temaru	13	+3
Fetia Api	Boris Léontieff	7	New
Independents	–	1	−2
This lists parties that won seats. See the complete results below.

Legislative elections were held in French Polynesia on 6 May 2001 for the Territorial Assembly. The result was a victory for Tahoera'a Huiraatira, which won 28 of 49 seats. The pro independence Tāvini Huiraʻatira won 13 seats, and Fetia Api 7. A single independent, Chantal Flores (associated with the Tapura Amui no Tuhaa Pae party), was elected in the Austral Islands. The Aia Api party failed to reach the 5% threshold and was eliminated from the Assembly.

Following the election Gaston Flosse was re-elected as President of French Polynesia.

== Results ==
Party	Seats
Tahoera'a Huiraatira	28
Tāvini Huiraʻatira	13
Fetia Api	7
Independents	1
Total	49
Source: Von Strokirch
