= Miriama Bono =

Polynesian architect, abstract painter, and curator

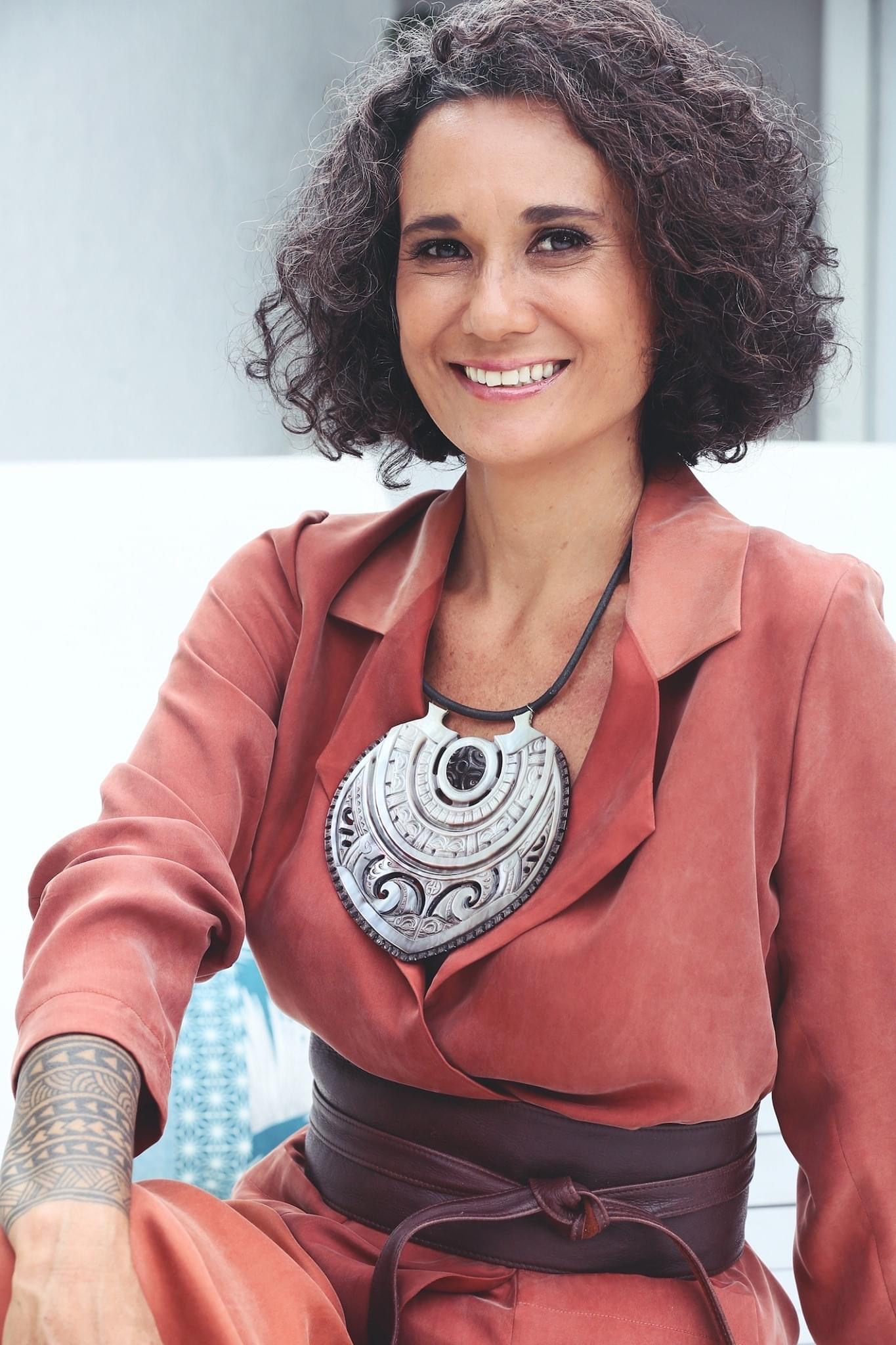
- Born: 9 July 1977 (age 48)
- Education: Lycée Paul-Gauguin; National School of Architecture of Paris-La Villette
- Occupations: Architect; painter; curator; cultural manager
- Years active: 2002–present
- Known for: Directing the Museum of Tahiti and the Islands (Te Fare Iamanaha); Polynesian art podcasts
- Honours: Chevalier de l' Ordre national du Mérite

Miriama Bono (born 9 July 1977) is a Polynesian architect, abstract painter, and exhibition curator. She served as director of the Museum of Tahiti and the Islands (Te Fare Iamanaha) from 2017 to 2023, leading the museum's major renovation and coordinating international partnerships. She is also known for podcasts focused on Polynesian creativity and storytelling.

== Early life and education ==
Bono grew up in French Polynesia and attended Lycée Paul-Gauguin in Papeete. At 19, she entered the École nationale supérieure d'architecture de Paris-La Villette, graduating in March 2002 with a specialization in territorial planning.

== Career ==
=== Early professional roles ===
Returning to French Polynesia in 2002, Bono first worked as an architectural consultant within the services of the presidency of French Polynesia. She then joined the Ministry of the Environment, where she served successively as chief of staff and communications officer until 2004, at the onset of local political instability.

=== Artistic practice ===
From 2004 to 2008, while living in France (Ajaccio and Paris), she devoted herself to abstract painting, developing a refined, pared-back style presented in exhibitions in Strasbourg, Paris, Ajaccio, and Nouméa.

=== Cultural engagement in Polynesia ===
Back in Polynesia in 2008, she led the Atelier des artistes at Le Méridien Hotel in Punaauia and organized several events. In 2012, Wallès Kotra and Heremoana Maamaatuaiahutapu, co-founders of the FIFO – Festival of Oceanian Documentary Film, entrusted her with the festival's delegation. She helped open FIFO to other Pacific festivals (Australia, New Zealand, New Caledonia, Hawaiʻi) by supporting the PADISA framework. In 2015, she chaired the association organizing FIFO and became a technical advisor for communication and culture to the Minister of Culture, Environment and Communication, where she launched preliminary studies for the future cultural center of French Polynesia.

=== Museum of Tahiti and the Islands (2017–2023) ===
In 2017, Bono was appointed director of the Museum of Tahiti and the Islands, succeeding Theano Jaillet. Her combined background in architecture and cultural management was seen as key to the institution's renovation.

Construction began in 2019; Bono oversaw the building site and coordinated international partnerships that enabled, for the 2023 reopening, the temporary return to Polynesia of 20 major objects from institutions including the British Museum, the Museum of Archaeology and Anthropology, Cambridge, and the Musée du Quai Branly – Jacques Chirac. Among them was the celebrated statue of the deity A‘a from Rurutu, a landmark loan that boosted the regional visibility of the museum, renamed Te Fare Iamanaha.

In parallel, she curated several exhibitions, including the Polynesian representation at the Révélations art fair in Paris and “Maro‘ura, a Polynesian Treasure” at the Musée du Quai Branly – Jacques Chirac.

=== Curatorial activities (since 2023) ===
In November 2023, Bono left the directorship to focus on artistic and curatorial projects and on promoting Polynesian artists across the Pacific and Europe. She participated in both Talanoa Forum initiatives led by artist Yuki Kihara—at the Venice Biennale (2020) and at Sydney's Powerhouse Museum (2023)—and contributed to international publications.

In 2024, she was a speaker for the exhibition GAUGUIN’S WORLD: Tōna Iho, Tōna Ao at the National Gallery of Australia (Canberra), in connection with the Savage Klub and its founder Rosanna Raymond, and supported the participation of Tahitian artist Tahe Drollet. The exhibition later traveled to the Museum of Fine Arts, Houston, where she gave a lecture promoting an Indigenous artistic perspective beyond post-Gauguin readings. She also contributed to curatorial thinking for the Queensland Triennial towards Polynesian participation in 2027, and collaborated on Tau o Mai | Journeys with Mai at the Fitzwilliam Museum (University of Cambridge) with Hinatea Colombani and Tahe Drollet (selection of works and label writing). She is also preparing, with the Tahiti Podcast label, a youth fiction podcast about Mai.

== Podcasts ==
In 2019, Bono launched Tahitian Talk, described as the first native Polynesian podcast devoted to creative processes in French Polynesia. In March 2020, during the first COVID-19 lockdown, she created Parau Tama, dedicated to Polynesian tales and legends. Building on these experiences, she co-founded the Tahiti Podcast label to produce programs in a similar spirit.

== Publications ==
- “The Oceanian Documentary Film: A New Form of Resistance”, Lagoonscapes, vol. 3, no. 2, 2023, pp. 286–292. doi:10.30687/LGSP-2785-2709-2023-02-008 edizionicafoscari.unive.it/media/pdf/article/the-venice-journal-of-environmental-humanities/2023/2/art-10.30687-LGSP-2785-2709-2023-02-008_OesbpmR.pdf
- “Rendre visible la diversité dans les musées”, Hommes & Migrations, no. 1340, 2023, pp. 65–71. www.cairn.info/revue-hommes-et-migrations-2023-1-page-65.htm
- With Tamara Maric, Marine Vallée, Vairea Teissier, Tara Hiquily, Mahinatea Gatien: “Repenser le musée de Tahiti et des Îles – Te Fare Manaha: genèse, histoire, bilan et perspectives d’un projet de rénovation”, Journal de la Société des Océanistes, no. 155, 2022, pp. 269–282. www.cairn.info/revue-journal-de-la-societe-des-oceanistes-2022-2-page-269.htm

== Honours ==
- Knight of the Ordre national du Mérite (2017).
- Knight of the Légion d'honneur (2025).
- Knight of the Ordre des Arts et des Lettres (2025).
