= Fauura Bouteau =

French Polynesian jeweller

Fauura Bouteau (born 24 April 1942) is a French Polynesian jeweller and president of the Association of Polynesian Art Crafts and the Association of Polynesian Art Jewellery. She is the mother of politician Nicole Bouteau.

Bouteau was born in Tautira. After working in a local hotel, she moved to France after she was married. She returned to French Polynesia in 1973, and worked as a farmer, before starting a business making traditional Polynesian jewellery in the 1980s.

In March 2019 she was made a knight of the Order of Tahiti Nui.
