= Isabelle Sachet =

French Polynesian politician

Minister of Family and Solidarity, in charge of Equal Opportunities
- In office 24 May 2018 – 21 February 2022
- President: Édouard Fritch
- Succeeded by: Virginie Bruant

Minister for the Fight against Exclusion and the Status of Women
- In office 17 September 2020 – 21 February 2022
- Preceded by: Nicole Bouteau
- Succeeded by: Virginie Bruant

Member of the French Polynesian Assembly for Windward Isles 3
- In office 7 May 2013 – 30 April 2023

Personal details
- Born: 1958 (age 67–68)
- Party: Tahoera'a Huiraatira; Tapura Huiraatira

Isabelle Sachet (née Crolas) (born 1958) is a French Polynesian politician and former Cabinet Minister who served in the government of Édouard Fritch. She is a member of the Tapura Huiraatira.

Sachet worked as a teacher, and then as a school principal. In February 2001 she was made a chevalier of the Ordre des Palmes académiques. She was first elected to the Assembly of French Polynesia in the 2013 French Polynesian legislative election as a representative of the Tahoera'a Huiraatira. In the 2014 municipal elections she headed the Tahoera'a Huiraatira list in Faaa, losing by a wide margin to Oscar Temaru.

In December 2015 she quit the Tahoera'a party to join Édouard Fritch's Tapura Huiraatira, citing the need to give Fritch a majority. She was re-elected to the Assembly in the 2018 election. Following the election she was appointed to Fritch's Cabinet as Minister of Family and Solidarity, in charge of Equal Opportunities, surrendering her position in the Assembly as a result. A cabinet reshuffle in September 2020 following the resignation of Teva Rohfritsch saw her gain responsibility for the Fight against Exclusion and the Status of Women.

She was replaced as a Minister in a cabinet reshuffle in February 2022, and her portfolios were taken over by Virginie Bruant. After leaving cabinet she returned to the Assembly. She was not included in Tapura's list at the 2023 election.
