= Ronny Teriipaia =

French Polynesian politician (born 1971)

Minister of Education
- Incumbent
- Assumed office 15 May 2023
- President: Moetai Brotherson
- Preceded by: Christelle Lehartel

Personal details
- Born: 1971 (age 54–55)
- Party: Tāvini Huiraʻatira

Ronny Teriipaia-Naia (born 1971) is a French Polynesian educator, politician and Cabinet Minister. He is a member of Tāvini Huiraʻatira.

Teriipaia had a twenty-year career in education, particularly primary education, before entering politics. He was chair of the Tāvini's youth wing from 2009 to 2010. In 2014 he completed a masters thesis at the University of French Polynesia on Mā̕ Ohi tradition and culture within the Catholic Church of French Polynesia. In 2017 he completed a doctoral thesis on the same subject. In 2021 he was the first person to pass the admission tests for Agrégation in Reo Tahiti.

On 15 May 2023 he was appointed Minister of Education in the government of Moetai Brotherson.
