= Kehaulani Chanquy =

Kehaulani Chanquy is a French Polynesian dancer. She leads the Hitireva dance troupe, and runs the Arato’a dance school.

Chanquy began dancing as a child, and was trained at the Artistic Conservatory of French Polynesia.

In 2000, at the age of 19, she took over the Arato’a dance school. In 2006 she established the Hitireva troupe. With Hitireva, she won the Heiva grand prize in the amateur category in 2009, and in the professional category in 2016. In 2018, in collaboration with the CAPF, she presented E Parauparau Te Ôfa’i, a dance show aimed at telling the history of the Arahurahu marae.
