= Cédric Mercadal =

French Polynesian politician

Minister of Health
- Incumbent
- Assumed office 15 May 2023
- President: Moetai Brotherson
- Preceded by: Jacques Raynal

Personal details
- Born: 1982 or 1983 (age 42–43)
- Party: Tāvini Huiraʻatira

Cédric Mercadal (born 1982 or 1983) is a French Polynesian lawyer, civil servant, politician, and Cabinet Minister. He is a member of Tāvini Huiraʻatira.

Mercadal grew up in French Polynesia and trained as a lawyer in France. He worked as a technical adviser in the government of Oscar Temaru before working for 12 years as a legal officer for the CPS social insurance fund.

On 15 May 2023 he was appointed Minister of Health and Prevention, in charge of Generalized Social Protection in the government of Moetai Brotherson.
