= Madeleine Moua =

French Polynesian dance troupe leader

Madeleine Teroroheiarii Moua (5 April 1899 - 16 November 1989) was a French Polynesian dance troupe leader and major choreographer of Tahitian dance. She was the founder of the Heiva troupe. She was descended from the Tahitian royal family.

== Biography ==
Moua was born in Papeete and started dancing at the age of six. After becoming a school principal, she wanted to pass on her knowledge. In 1956 she revived Tahitian dance and made it respectable, by founding her dance group, called Heiva. At this time Tahitian dance was called tamure and danced in the disreputable nightclubs of Papeete and had a bad reputation.

In 1956, after having attended Breton and Auvergne folk dances, Moua felt the need to bring traditional Tahitian dance up to date. This is how, when she was director of the Paofai school in Papeete, she set up the first dance group. In 1974 the group toured Australia.

Coco Hotahota joined Heiva from the start before founding Temaeva, a troupe that modernized the tamure. Other members of Heiva included Louise Kimitete, Pauline Morgan, and Joseph Uura. The tuirai festivities restored the old dances and became institutionalized in a festival which was renamed Heiva when French Polynesia became autonomous.

== Posterity ==
Coco Hotahota tracked down former troop leaders and collected their knowledge, then exported it overseas. Thus the initiative of Madeleine Moua took on considerable proportions. Today there are thousands of Tahitian dance schools around the world, particularly in Japan, the United States, Mexico and China . It is to Madeleine Moua that Polynesia owes the rebirth of Tahitian dance which almost disappeared in the 18th century.

In 2016, Tahiti's postal service put her image (and that of fellow dancer Gilles Hollande) on a stamp.

In 2019, she was the subject of a "Portrait of a Woman", a 50-minute feature film directed by Tony Turqem broadcast on Polynésie la 1.
