= Yvonnick Raffin =

French Polynesian politician

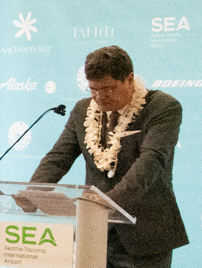
- Raffin in 2022

Minister of Finance and Economy
- In office 17 September 2020 – 15 May 2023
- President: Édouard Fritch
- Preceded by: Teva Rohfritsch
- Succeeded by: Tevaiti-Ariipaea Pomare

Minister of Tourism
- In office 10 November 2021 – 21 February 2022
- Preceded by: Nicole Bouteau
- Succeeded by: Édouard Fritch

Personal details
- Born: 3 February 1963 (age 63) Papeete
- Party: Tapura Huiraatira

Yvonnick Raffin (born 3 February 1963) is a French Polynesian politician and former Cabinet Minister. He is a member of Tapura Huiraatira.

Raffin was born in Papeete and trained as an engineer. He worked as a deputy director-general at EDT. On 1 May 2017 he was appointed head of social welfare agency Caisse de Prévoyance Sociale.

On 17 September 2020 he was appointed Minister of Finance in the cabinet of Édouard Fritch, replacing Teva Rohfritsch who had resigned after becoming a Senator. On 10 November 2021 he was also allocated the tourism portfolio following the resignation of Nicole Bouteau. A cabinet reshuffle in February 2022 saw him gain responsibility for telecommunications, but surrender responsibility for tourism.
