= Maco Tevane =

French Polynesian politician

Minister of Culture and the Environment
- In office 18 May 1994 – 4 August 1994
- President: Gaston Flosse
- Preceded by: Justin Arapari (culture); Pierre Dehors (environment)
- Succeeded by: Patrick Howell

Minister of Social Affairs, Employment, and Labour
- In office 11 September 1991 – 18 May 1994
- Preceded by: Joël Buillard
- Succeeded by: Raymond Van Bastolaer

Personal details
- Born: 13 August 1937 Papeete, French Polynesia
- Died: 21 August 2013. Papeete, French Polynesia
- Party: Here Ai'a

Maco Tevane, real name Marc Maamaatuaiahutapu (13 August 1937 – 21 August 2013) was a French Polynesian author, playwright, and politician who served as Minister of Culture in the government of Gaston Flosse in the 1990s. He was a defender of Polynesian culture and the Tahitian language and is considered the founding father of popular Tahitian theatre. He was the father of politician Heremoana Maamaatuaiahutapu and TNTV director Mateata Maamaatuaiahutapu.

== Early life ==
After graduating from high school with a national diploma he worked as a surveyor for the land registry before working for the lands service. After gaining a qualification in teaching Tahitian he worked as a court interpreter and then for the Office de Radiodiffusion Télévision Française as a television host.

In August 1972 he founded the Tahitian Academy. In 1974 he was one of its first academic members. In 1979 he created the Artistic Conservatory of French Polynesia to promote traditional arts and culture.

== Political career ==
In October 1966 Tevane was elected as a municipal councillor in Papeete. From 1972 to 1982 he worked as an advisor to the French Polynesian government. He frequently represented French Polynesia at meetings of the South Pacific Commission.

He stood unsuccessfully for the National Assembly in the 1978 French legislative election, losing to Gaston Flosse. He ran again in the 1981 election, but gained only 3.9% of the vote. Shortly before the 1982 French Polynesian legislative election he founded the Social Democrat party with Frantz Vanizette, but gained only 2.8% of the vote.

In September 1991 he was appointed Minister of Social Affairs, Employment, and Labour in the government of Gaston Flosse. He later served as Minister of Culture and the Environment. He resigned as a minister in August 1994 following a coalition realignment.

== Plays ==
- 1972: Te pe'ape'a hau 'ore o Papa Penu e o Mama Roro (The incessant arguments of Papa Penu and Mama Roro)
- 1974: Te huno'a mana'o 'ore hia ("The Unexpected Son-in-Law")

== Honours ==
In 1983 he was made a Chevalier of the Ordre national du Mérite. In 1989 he was made an officer.

In June 2000 he was appointed an Officer of the Order of Tahiti Nui.

In November 2016 Taunoa College was renamed as Maco Tevane College in his honour.
