= Manouche Lehartel =

- Marthe Taiana Tepuanoanoa Lehartel
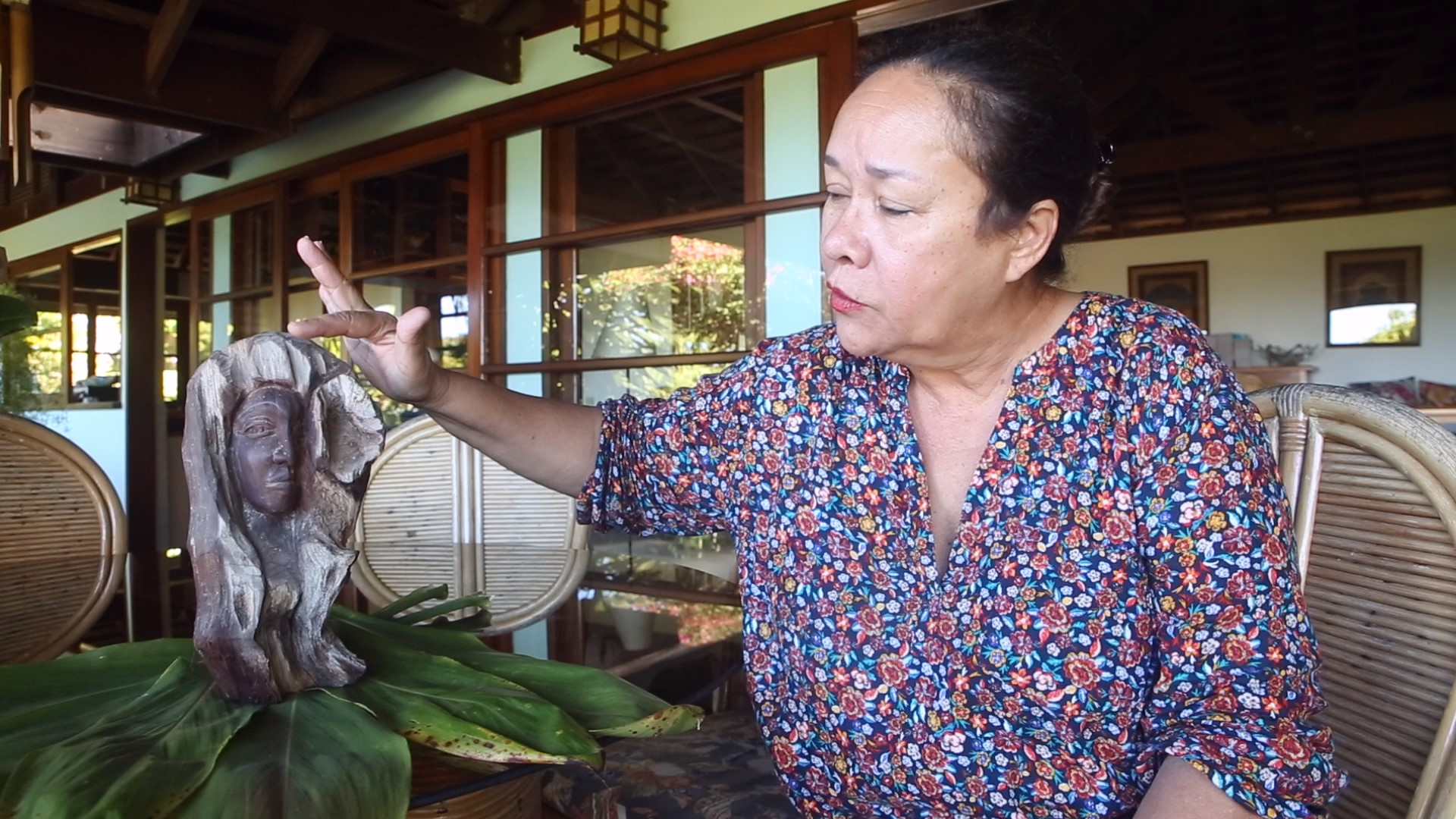
- Manouche Lehartel and a sculpture by Vaiere Mara
- Occupation: Museographer Tahitian dance troupe leader
- Years active: Since 1983
- Employer: Tahiti Museum
- Children: Tuarii Tracqui

Manouche Lehartel is a French Polynesian dance expert. She has served repeatedly on the jury of the Hevia i Tahiti festival and cofounded the 'Ori Tahiti Nui dance competition. She was the first Polynesian director of the Musée de Tahiti et des Îles, and directed the museum for twenty years. She is the mother of dancer and actor Tuarii Tracqui.

She has a long involvement with the Heiva i Tahiti dance festival, having served on its jury seven times. She was president of the jury in 2013, 2014, and 2022. In 2012 she co-founded (with Tumata Robinson) the 'Ori Tahiti Nui international dance competition.

She was first appointed director of the Musée de Tahiti et des Îles in 1983. In December 2016 she was reappointed as acting director of the museum following the departure of Théano Jaillet. She was replaced in March 2017 by Miriama Bono.
