= Tapura Amui No Raromatai =

Political party in French Polynesia

The Tapura Amui No Raromatai was a political party in French Polynesia. In the 2004 general election on May 23, 2004, and the subsequent by-elections on February 13, 2005, the party was part of Oscar Temaru's Union for Democracy (French: Union pour la Démocratie) coalition that won 27 out of 57 seats.

== See also ==
- List of political parties in French Polynesia
- Elections in French Polynesia
- Assembly of French Polynesia
- Politics of French Polynesia
