= Emmanuel Kasarhérou =

Emmanuel Kasarhérou (b. 1960) is the curator of Musée du quai Branly – Jacques Chirac, located in Paris, France. He is the first Kanak person to head a major museum in mainland France. He is the former head of the Jean-Marie Tjibaou Cultural Centre in New Caledonia. He specializes in the art of New Caledonia and Oceanic cultures.

== Early life ==
In 1960, Emmanuel Kasarhérou was born in Noumea, New Caledonia. His father, who was of Kanak descent, worked as a tailor; he had traveled to Paris to learn his craft. His mother, Jacqueline de La Fontinelle, was originally from France. She was a linguist who specialized in the Houailou language. As a child, Emmanuel saw himself as Indiana Jones, and he was passionate about prehistory. He received training from José Garanger, an oceanic archaeologist, with whom he participated in archaeological excavations.

== Career ==
In 1985, when Kasarhérou was 25 years old, he became the director of Musée de la Nouvelle-Calédonie (Museum of New Caledonia). At the time, New Caledonia was in the midst of a civil war. In 1990, Kasarhérou and Roger Bouley were co-curators of an exhibition of Kanak artwork at the museum.

In 1994, he became involved with the development of the Tjibaou Cultural Center. The center was named after Jean-Marie Tjibaou, the founder of the Kanak and Socialist National Liberation Front (FLNKS), who had been assassinated in 1989.

In 2013, Kasarhérou and Broulay co-curated “Kanak, art is a Statement" at Musée du Quai Branly – Jacques Chirac. He became an assistant director of the museum in 2014. In 2020, it was announced that Kasarhérou would be the new head of Musée du Quai Branly – Jacques Chirac. As director, Kasarhérou shared that he wanted to acknowledge the colonial history and context of the museum.

== Views ==
Kasarhérou has spoken of his perspective as someone of both French and Kanak descent. He explained, "I feel as much the descendant of people who were colonizers of a certain place as of people who were colonized." He has discussed the lack of indigenous perspective in the display of their art. He has remarked, "You should not imagine that just by putting our objects in your museums you're letting us be the ones to speak about them."
