= Nathalie Heirani Salmon-Hudry =

- Born: August 9, 1983 (age 42); Papeete, French Polynesia
- Occupations: disability advocate, writer, politician
- Notable work: Je suis née morte, Sur les chemins de la vie

Nathalie Heirani Salmon-Hudry (born 9 August 1983) is a French Polynesian disability advocate, writer and politician. Her book Je suis née Morte (I was born dead) was awarded the Vi Nimö literary prize in New Caledonia in 2015.

== Biography ==
Salmon-Hudry was born in Papeete. She is severely disabled due to a medical error during her birth. She writes using a computer head pointer; her book Je suis née morte is an autobiography which describes her life growing up with a disability in Tahiti. The book won the Vi Nimö prize, awarded by high school students in New Caledonia.

In 2014, she participated in the Paris Book Fair and the Oceanian Book Fair in Rochefort. In 2015, she sponsored the “Fight like a girl” event in Pirae, an introduction to self-defense techniques for young women, as part of the day to combat violence against women.

In 2019, she published her second book, Sur les chemins de la vie, which she edited herself. These are personal reflections on universal topics like love and courage. She also talks about her faith and spirituality. She says that she was inspired in writing this book by encounters with homeless people.

On 15 May 2023 she was appointed Interminsterial Delegate for Disability in the government of Moetai Brotherson.
