= Boris Léontieff =

French Polynesian politician (1955–2002)

Mayor of Arue
- In office 1989 – 23 May 2002
- Succeeded by: Philip Schyle

Leader of Fetia Api Party
- In office 1996 – 23 May 2002
- Preceded by: None (Party founded)
- Succeeded by: Philip Schyle

Member of the French Polynesian Assembly for Windward Isles
- In office May 1996 – 23 May 2002

Personal details
- Born: 19 September 1955 Papeete, French Polynesia
- Died: 23 May 2002 (aged 46)
- Cause of death: Plane disappearance
- Party: Fetia Api
- Relatives: Alexandre Léontieff

Boris Léontieff-Teahu (19 September 1955 – 23 May 2002) was a French Polynesian politician and member of the Assembly of French Polynesia. He was the mayor of Arue, a small commune on the Windward Islands, and founder and President of the Fetia Api party until his disappearance in 2002.

He was the brother of former President of French Polynesia, Alexandre Léontieff.

The club pitch of the football team A.S. Arue in Tahiti Ligue 1, of Tahitian football, was named after him.

== Political career ==
Boris Léontieff was born in Papeete, French Polynesia on 9 September 1955. He began his political career in 1989 as the Mayor of Arue, a small town on the outskirts of Papeete.

In 1996, Léontieff founded the Fetia Api party, which advocated for French Polynesian independence and opposed Gaston Flosse. Journalist Jean-Pascal Couraud, who blamed Gaston Flosse for the closure of his newspaper, also helped establish the party.

Léontieff ran for the Windward Islands seats at the 1996 French Polynesian legislative election. His party successfully won one seat, and he was elected to the Assembly. At the same election, his brother returned to politics and successfully represented a pro-independence party, sharing the beliefs of his brother Boris. Shortly after this, Couraud went missing on December 15, 1997, and Boris Léontieff temporarily left his position.

At the 2001 election Fetia Api won seven seats, and Léontieff was again elected to the Assembly.

== Disappearance ==
On 23 May 2002, Léontieff and Fetia Api members Lucien Kimitete, Arsen Tuairau and Ferfine Besseyre set out on a flight from Kaukura to Makemo in the Tuamotus to campaign in municipal elections. The plane was diverted due to bad weather to Nuku Hiva in the Marquesas Islands, and failed to arrive in Makemo. A sea-search was unsuccessful, and was called off after a week. The French colonial government refused to delay the elections. Despite a number of private searches, the aircraft was never found, and Léontieff was declared dead in January 2003. A 2005 inquiry into the disappearance by the Fetia Api party concluded that the aircraft may have crashed due to a fuel supply problem.

In 2004, allegations that Jean-Pascal Couraud had been murdered by members of the Gaston Flosse's private police force, the Presidential Intervention Group (GIP), led to speculation that Léontieff's disappearance had been the result of foul play. Allegations were also made that both Léontieff and Courard had been under surveillance by the Flosse regime. The Assembly of French Polynesia began an inquiry in June 2005. In 2009 a letter was found admitting guilt to Couraud's kidnapping, and a French judge investigating the case expanded their investigation to include Léontieff's disappearance. The investigation found no explanation for the plane's disappearance, and the case was closed in May 2011. A claim for compensation by Léontieff's widow was rejected in March 2013.
