= Virginie Bruant =

French Polynesian politician

Minister of Labour, Family, Solidarity, and the Status of Women
- In office 21 February 2022 – 15 May 2023
- President: Édouard Fritch
- Preceded by: Isabelle Sachet
- Succeeded by: Vannina Crolas (Labour); Chantal Galenon (Solidairity)

Member of the French Polynesian Assembly for Windward Isles 1
- In office 5 May 2013 – 30 April 2023

Personal details
- Born: 1979 (age 46–47)
- Party: Tahoera'a Huiraatira; Tapura Huiraatira

Virginie Bruant (born 1979) is a French Polynesian politician and former Cabinet Minister. She is a member of the Tapura Huiraatira.

Bruant is the French Polynesian representative of the Société des auteurs, compositeurs et éditeurs de musique (SACEM).

She was first elected to the Assembly of French Polynesia in the 2013 French Polynesian legislative election as a representative of the Tahoera'a Huiraatira, and elected chair of the budget and financial control committee. In March 2015 she was one of a group of 14 Tahoera'a MPs who demanding an accounting of the use of the parliamentary group's funds. Shortly afterwards, in May 2015, she became a founding member of Tapura Huiraatira. She was re-elected to the Assembly in the 2018 election and elected chair of the health, solidarity and labour committee.

In February 2022 she was appointed to Cabinet as Minister of Labour, Solidarity, Training, Status of Women, Family and Non-autonomous Persons.
