= 2008 French Polynesian legislative election =

- 27 January 2008 (first round); 10 February 2008 (second round)
- All 57 seats in the Assembly of French Polynesia
Party	Leader	Vote %	Seats
To Tatou Ai'a	Gaston Tong Sang	32.69	23
Union for Democracy	Oscar Temaru	31.89	19
Tāhōʻēraʻa Huiraʻatira	Gaston Flosse	21.82	10
Te Henua Enata a Tu		2.21	2
Te Niu Hau Manahune		1.62	2
Tapura Amui	Chantal Florès-Tahiata	0.94	1
This lists parties that won seats. See the complete results below.
President before	President after
Oscar Temaru; UMP	Gaston Flosse; UMP

Early legislative elections were held in French Polynesia in early 2008. The first round was held on 27 January, with the second round on 10 February. The early elections was the first one to be conducted under a reformed electoral system.

== Background ==
=== 2007 political crisis ===
In July 2007, Former French Polynesian President Gaston Tong Sang was heavily criticized by Gaston Flosse, former president and the founder of Tong Sang's party, Tahoeraa Huiraatira. Flosse accused Tong Sang of caving in too easily to the demands of some of French Polynesia's minor coalition parties and ignoring the needs of Tahoeraa Huiraatira. Critics of Flosse asserted that the attack was merely a move by Flosse to regain the presidency, an accusation bolstered by revelations that Flosse had "secret talks" with Oscar Temaru, former president and a leading pro-independence politician who has been Flosse's long time political opponent in the past. According to reports, the talks were aimed at ousting Sang from office and setting up a unity platform between Flosse and Temaru's respective political parties.

On 29 August 2007, a no confidence motion was introduced by Temaru's Union for Democracy (UPLD). The UPLD said that the no confidence motion against Tong Sang was based on the fact that he had only small support in the Assembly, thus losing his legitimacy to govern. Tong Sang's own Tahoeraa Huiraatira party asked him to resign ahead of the vote of no confidence against him. Tong Sang refused the calls from his party to step down.

Tong Sang's government fell after the vote of no confidence was passed by French Polynesia's 57 member Assembly on August 31. The motion Sang was passed by a majority 35 members of the Assembly, including some members of the governing Tahoera'a Huiraatira party. Tong Sang tried to save his government by offering Tahoer'a Huiraatira 7 ministerial posts. The deal was refused.

The motion against Tong Sang was the first time that Oscar Temaru's Union for Democracy and Gaston Flosse's Tahoera'a Huiraatira party formed a de facto alliance to oust a sitting French Polynesian government.

=== Post-crisis ===
After his ousting from government, Gaston Tong Sang left Tahoera'a Huiraatira and founded a new party, O Porinetia To Tatou Ai'a. The new party, from the onset, had 6 members in the Assembly, all former members of Tahoera'a Huiraatira.

After Tong Sang's ouster, which was the third time a French Polynesian government was ousted from power via motions of no confidence since 2004, calls for electoral reform were heard. This culminated in an electoral reform package that was passed by France in November of the same year.

After elections were announced, President of French Polynesia Oscar Temaru stated that he would prefer to have elections after the French municipal elections in March 2008.

== Electoral system ==
The new system, approved in France on 26 November 2007, was meant to stabilise the chaotic French Polynesian political scene. Under the new system, a two-round election system was promulgated, and candidates from any political party require at least 12.5% of the vote to enter the second round of voting, and a general electoral threshold of 5% was set.

== Results ==
Party	First round		Second round		Seats
Party	Votes	%	Votes	%	Seats
To Tatou Ai'a (Note: Coalition of O Porinetia To Tatou Ai'a, Rautahi, Aia Api, Fetia Api, Te mana Toa and Taatiraa no te Hau)	41,061	32.69	55,257	42.84	23
Union for Democracy (Note: Coalition of Tavini Huiraatira and Tapura Amui No Raromatai)	40,050	31.89	47,811	37.07	19
Tahoera'a Huiraatira	27,403	21.82	21,965	17.03	10
No Oe E Te Nunaa	6,612	5.26			0
Te Henua Enata a Tu	2,772	2.21			2
Te Niu Hau Manahune	2,035	1.62	2,502	1.94	2
Tapura Amui no Tuhaa Pae	1,183	0.94	1,448	1.12	1
Te Avei'a	1,101	0.88			0
Porinetia Ora	1,099	0.87			0
Te Henua Enana Kotoa	497	0.40			0
Here Ai'a Te Nunaa Ia Ora	487	0.39			0
Tapura Amui No Raromatai	312	0.25			0
Te E'a No Te Autaea'era'a	288	0.23			0
Hau Pakumotu	221	0.18			0
A Tia I Nia Tamaarii Tuhaa Pae	203	0.16			0
Te Ao Hou No Oe	171	0.14			0
Heikura	63	0.05			0
Te Ati O Te Henua Enana	44	0.04			0
Total	125,602	100.00	128,983	100.00	57
Valid votes	125,602	99.00	128,983	99.05	
Invalid/blank votes	1,265	1.00	1,241	0.95	
Total votes	126,867	100.00	130,224	100.00	
Registered voters/turnout	176,751	71.78	170,211	76.51	
Source: Haut Commissariat

== Aftermath ==
According to reports, the two pro-autonomy/anti-independence factions were likely to agree to form the government for the next five years, but coalition talks broke down on 20 February 2008. The President of the Assembly was decided to be elected on 22 February 2008, with presidential elections in the Assembly to follow on 24 February 2008.

In the election for the President of the Assembly, the incumbent Edouard Fritch was reelected with 36 votes while the pro-independence candidate Antony Géros received 21 votes; one of the 37 pro-autonomy MPs had therefore evidently voted for Géros.
