= List of political parties in French Polynesia =

This article lists political parties in French Polynesia.

French Polynesia has a multi-party system, where multiple parties can achieve electoral success.

== Parties nationally represented ==
Party	Ideology	Founded	MAs	Députés	Senators	Mayors of municipalities with more than 3,000 inhabitants
Serve the People; Tāvini Huiraʻatira	Polynesian independence; Progressivism	1977	20 / 57	1 / 3	0 / 2	2 / 21
Let's Stay the Course; A Fano Tiʻa	Polynesian independence; Green politics	1977	17 / 57	0 / 3	0 / 2	0 / 21
List of the People; Tāpura Huiraʻatira	French Polynesian autonomy; Liberalism	2016	15 / 57	1 / 3	2 / 2	18 / 21
I Love Polynesia; A here ia Porinetia	French Polynesian autonomy; Reformism; Libertarianism	2020	3 / 57	1 / 3	0 / 2	0 / 21
Rally of the Maohi People ʻĀmuitahiraʻa o te Nūnaʻa Māʻohi; Rassemblement du peuple Maohi	Conservatism	1977	1 / 57	0 / 3	0 / 2	0 / 21

== Other Parties ==
Party	Ideology	Founded	Mayors of municipalities with more than 3,000 inhabitants	Municipal Councillors
Alliance for Development; Hotuātau firiāuì		2025	1 / 21	0 / 1,056
Hau Māʻohi	Polynesian independence	2016	0 / 21	1 / 1,056
Long Live the People; Ia Ora te Nuna'a	French Polynesian autonomy	2022	0 / 21	1 / 1,056
Heiura-Les Verts	Green politics	1997	0 / 21	2 / 1,056
Love of the Land; Here Ai'a	Polynesian independence	1965	0 / 57	0 / 1,056
All of Us, Together; Taho'e tatou	French Polynesian autonomy	2024	0 / 21	0 / 1,056
New Land; Aia Api	Nationalism; Radicalism	1982	0 / 21	1 / 1,056

== Former parties ==
- A Tia Porinetia (2013 - 2016)
- Aia Api (New Land) (1982 - 2015)
- Fetia Api (New Star) (1996 - 2016) - Autonomist
- No Oe E Te Nunaa (This Country Is Yours)
- Porinetia Ora (2004 - 2015) - Autonomist
- Tapura Amui No Raromatai
- Tapura Amui no Tuhaa Pae (Austral Archipelago Union List) (2001 - 2018) - Pro-independence
- Tapura Amui No Te Faatereraa Manahune - Tuhaa Pae (2004) - Pro-independence Coalition
- Te Tiarama

== See also ==
- List of political parties by country
