= Artistic Conservatory of French Polynesia =

Cultural organization in French Polynesia

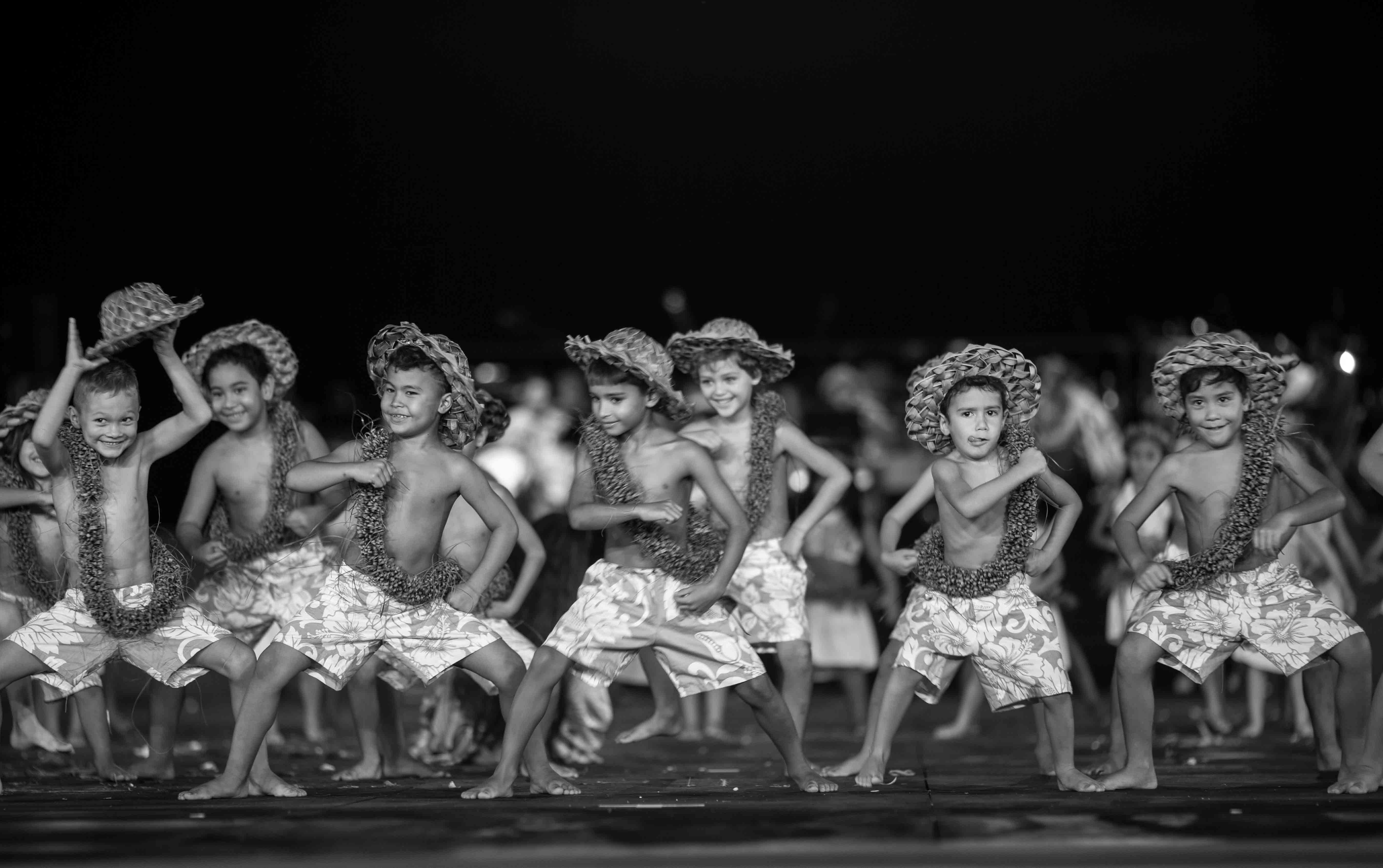
A pic from a biannual grand gala organized by the Conservatoire Artistique de Polynésie Française to showcase the work done in its classes (2019)

The Artistic Conservatory of French Polynesia (ty: te fare upa rau est / fr: Conservatoire artistique de Polynésie française) or CAPF is a cultural organisation in French Polynesia whose goal is the conservation of the cultural heritage of French Polynesia. It was founded in 1979 by Maco Tevane and Claude Malric.

== Notable staff ==
- Louise Kimitete, dancer
- John Mairai, playwright
- Paulina Morgan
