= Heremoana Maamaatuaiahutapu =

French Polynesian politician

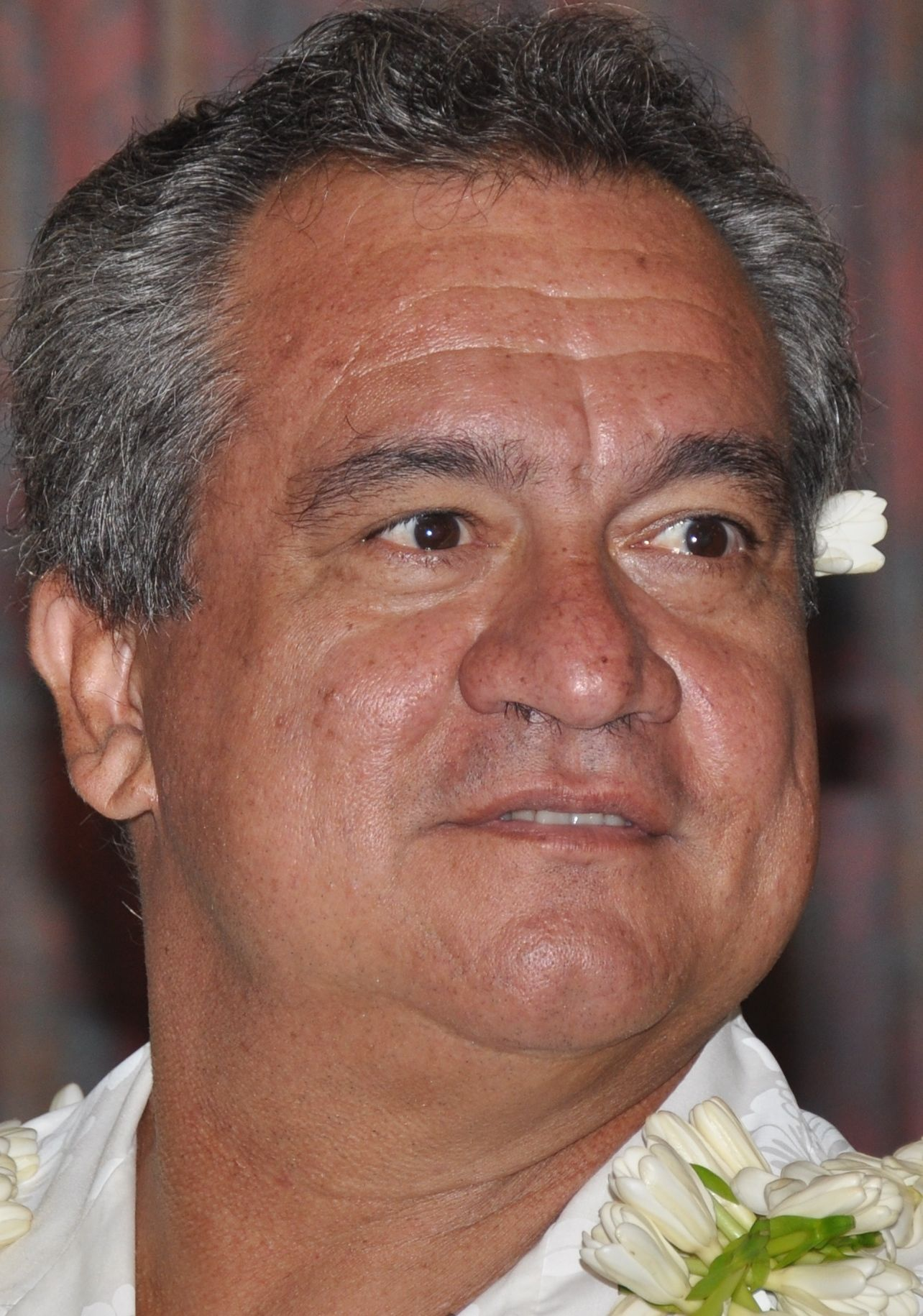
- Maamaatuaiahutapu in 2014

Minister of Culture and the Environment
- In office 25 March 2015 – 15 May 2023
- President: Édouard Fritch
- Preceded by: Nicole Sanquer
- Succeeded by: Moetai Brotherson

Minister of Youth and Sport
- In office 17 September 2020 – 21 February 2022
- Preceded by: Christelle Lehartel
- Succeeded by: Naea Bennett

Personal details
- Party: Tapura Huiraatira

Heremoana Maamaatuaiahutapu is a French Polynesian civil servant, politician, and former Cabinet Minister. He is a member of Tapura Huiraatira. He is the son of politician Maco Tevane and the brother of TNTV director Mateata Maamaatuaiahutapu.

== Early life ==
Maamaatuaiahutapu was educated in Bordeaux, graduating with a diploma of advanced studies in anthropology, then returned to French Polynesia where he worked as a civil servant and then at the Polynesian Center for Human Sciences and Musée de Tahiti et des Îles. In 2002 he was appointed director of the Maison de la Culture - Te Fare Tauhiti Nui. In this role, he helped establish the International Oceanian Documentary Film Festival. In 2010, he was elected chair of GIE Tahiti Tourism.

In February 2013 he was awarded the Ordre national du Mérite.

== Political career ==
In September 2014 he was appointed as Minister of Language Promotion, Culture, Communication and the Environment in the government of Édouard Fritch. As he was a senior civil servant at the time, he had to wait at least six months before taking up his ministerial duties. In the intervening period his portfolios were managed by Minister of Education Nicole Sanquer, and he was employed as a technical advisor in her office. He formally took office on 25 March 2015.

Following the 2018 French Polynesian legislative election in May 2018 he was reappointed as Minister of Culture and the Environment, in charge of Handicrafts. As environment minister he promoted the listing of the Marquesas Islands as a World Heritage Site and a ban on seabed mining.
