= Mateata Maamaatuaiahutapu =

Journalist and broadcaster

Mateata Maamaatuaiahutapu (born 1968) is a journalist and broadcaster from French Polynesia.

== Biography ==
Maamaatuaiahutapu was born in Papeete, Tahiti, French Polynesia. Her parents were Caroline Ellacott-Maamaatuaiahutapu and Maco Tevane, and she has three siblings. Her brother Heremoana Maamaatuaiahutapu became the Minister of Culture for French Polynesia.

Maamaatuaiahutapu joined Tahiti Nui Television (TNTV) on its establishment in 2000 and worked as a journalist, editor, and director. In 2015 she was appointed general manager of the network.
