= Elections in French Polynesia =

French Polynesia elects the Assembly of French Polynesia (Assemblée de la Polynésie française), the unicameral legislature at the territorial level. The Assembly has 57 members, elected for five-year terms by proportional representation in multi-seat constituencies. French Polynesia has a two-party system, which means that there are two dominant political parties, making it difficult to be elected under the banner of another party.

In June 2011, the electoral law was changed to a two-round system with a bonus of a third of the seats for the winning list in the second round, with the rest of the seats distributed proportionally; the electoral threshold to advance to the second round is 12.5%.

== Past elections ==
=== 2004 elections ===
The elections in 2004 produced a close result leading to unstable majorities in the assembly. In addition, the election was invalidated in districts in Tahiti and Mo'orea, prompting by-elections for 37 of the 57 seats.

=== 2007 elections ===
On September 14, 2007, Oscar Temaru, 63, was elected President of French Polynesia for the third time in three years (with 27 of the 44 votes cast in the Tahiti assembly). He replaced former President Gaston Tong Sang, who lost a no-confidence vote in the 31 August parliament.

=== 2008 elections ===
In the elections on January 27 and February 10, 2008, the To Tatou Ai'a (Our Land) party led by Gaston Tong Sang, Mayor of Bora Bora, won 29 seats out of the 66 possible but not an overall majority. The Union for Democracy coalition which included Oscar Temaru's pro-independence Tavini Huiraatira party gained 20 seats. A surprise coalition between old enemies Gaston Flosse (Tahoera'a Huiraatira, 10 seats) and Temaru saw once again the election of Flosse as President of French Polynesia.

== See also ==
- Electoral calendar
- Electoral system
