= Patrick Howell =

French Polynesian politician

Minister of Solidarity
- In office 25 March 2015 – 13 January 2017
- President: Édouard Fritch
- Preceded by: Nuihau Laurey
- Succeeded by: Jacques Raynal

Minister of Health
- In office 25 March 2015 – 13 January 2017
- President: Édouard Fritch
- Preceded by: Nuihau Laurey
- Succeeded by: Jacques Raynal
- In office 30 May 1996 – 11 September 2001
- President: Gaston Flosse
- Preceded by: Michel Buillard
- Succeeded by: Armelle Merceron

Minister for Scientific Research
- In office 30 May 1996 – 11 September 2001
- Preceded by: Simone Grand
- Succeeded by: Louise Peltzer
- In office 18 May 1994 – 28 June 1995
- Preceded by: Michel Buillard
- Succeeded by: Simone Grand

Minister for the Environment
- In office 18 May 1994 – 30 May 1996
- Preceded by: Pierre Dehors
- Succeeded by: Karl Meuel

Minister for Employment
- In office 28 June 1995 – 30 May 1996
- Preceded by: Raymond Van Bastolaer
- Succeeded by: Lucette Taero

Personal details
- Party: Tahoera'a Huiraatira; Tapura Huiraatira

Patrick Howell is a French Polynesian civil servant, politician, and former Cabinet Minister. He is a member of Tapura Huiraatira.

Howell trained as a dental surgeon and worked at the Teva I Uta medical center in the early 1980s before becoming head of dental hygiene services in French Polynesia. In 1993 he became director of public health. In the 1980s he campaigned against French nuclear testing and for the creation of a health register for test workers as part of the Tomite No Te Rai Hau ("Blue Skies Committee").

In May 1994 he was appointed Minister for the Environment and Scientific Research in the government of Gaston Flosse. In a cabinet reshuffle in June 1995 he became Minister of Employment, while retaining his Environment portfolio. In May 1996 he was appointed Minister of Health and Scientific Research, positions he held until September 2001.

In 2008 he was elected a municipal councillor in Punaauia.

In September 2014 he was appointed as Minister of Health and Solidarity in the government of Édouard Fritch. As he was a senior civil servant at the time, he had to wait at least six months before taking up his ministerial duties. In the intervening period his portfolios were managed by Vice-president Nuihau Laurey, and he was employed as a technical advisor in his office. He formally took office on 25 March 2015. In May 2015 he and five other Ministers were deemed to have resigned from the Tahoera'a after ceasing to attend their political council. In May 2015 he was appointed as one of the French Polynesian government's delegates to the newly-formed Nuclear Tests Information Commission, tasked with investigating the health and environmental impact of French nuclear testing. In October 2015 he established a health study of the inhabitants of Hao and Makemo, which were used as support bases for the tests.

In October 2016 he was selected as Tapura's candidate for French Polynesia's 3rd constituency in the 2017 French legislative election. He surrendered his ministerial portfolios in January 2017 so he could focus on the campaign. He led in the first round, but lost to Moetai Brotherson in the second.
