= Politics of French Polynesia =

Politics of French Polynesia takes place in a framework of a parliamentary representative democratic French overseas collectivity, whereby the President of French Polynesia is the head of government, and of a multi-party system. Executive power is exercised by the government. Legislative power is vested in both the government and the Assembly of French Polynesia.

Between 1946 and 2003, French Polynesia had the status of an overseas territory (French: territoire d'outre-mer, or TOM). In 2003 it became an overseas collectivity (collectivité d'outre-mer, or COM). Its statutory law of 27 February 2004 gives it the particular designation of "overseas country" to underline the large autonomy of the territory.

== Executive branch ==
Main office-holders
Office	Name	Party	Since
High Commissioner	Éric Spitz	Non-Partisan	23 September 2022
President of French Polynesia	Moetai Brotherson	Tāvini Huiraʻatira	12 May 2023
President of the Assembly	Antony Géros	Tāvini Huiraʻatira	11 May 2023

The President of the French Republic is represented by the High Commissioner of the Republic in French Polynesia (Haut-Commissaire de la République en Polynésie française). The government is headed by the President of French Polynesia. He submits as Council of Ministers a list of members of the Territorial Assembly, the Assembly of French Polynesia (Assemblée de la Polynésie française), for approval by them to serve as ministers.

== Legislative branch ==
French Polynesia elects the Assembly of French Polynesia (Assemblée de la Polynésie française), the unicameral legislature on the territorial level. The Assembly of French Polynesia has 57 members, elected for a five-year term by proportional representation in multi-seat constituencies. Since the territorial elections of March 6, 2001, the parity bill now requires that the number of women matches the number of men at the Assembly.

== Political parties and elections ==
Party	First round		Second round			
Party	Votes	%	Votes	%	Seats	+/–
Tapura Huiraatira	53,790	43.04	66,725	48.18	38	New
Tahoera'a Huiraatira	36,747	29.40	37,606	27.72	11	–27
Tavini Huiraatira	25,890	20.72	31,357	23.11	8	–3
Te Ora Api o Porinetia	4,604	3.68				
E Reo Manahune	2,503	2.00				
Popular Republican Union	1,443	1.15				
Total	124,975	100	135,688	100	57	0
Valid votes	124,975	98.31	135,688	98.33		
Blank votes	1,091	0.86	1,128	0.89		
Invalid votes	1,056	0.83	1,006	0.79		
Total	127,122	100	137,990	100		
Registered voters/turnout	206,662	61.51	206,520	66.82		
Source: Haut-Commissariat (first round, second round)

The members of the Assembly of French Polynesia are elected in 6 different electoral districts or electoral circumscriptions (French: circonscriptions électorales) which slightly differ from the administrative subdivisions (subdivisions administratives) on the Tuamotus and the Gambier Islands. The 6 electoral circumscriptions (circonscriptions électorales) are:

- electoral circumscription of the Windward Islands (circonscription des Îles du Vent) (37 members)
- electoral circumscription of the Leeward Islands (circonscription des Îles Sous-le-Vent) (8 members)
- electoral circumscription of the Austral Islands (circonscription des Îles Australes) (3 members)
- electoral circumscription of the Gambier Islands and the Islands Tuamotu-East (circonscription des Îles Gambier et Tuamotu Est) (3 members)
- electoral circumscription of the Islands Tuamotu-West (circonscription des Îles Tuamotu Ouest) (3 members)
- electoral circumscription of the Marquesas Islands (circonscription des Îles Marquises) (3 members)

== Judicial branch ==
Court of Appeal or Cour d'Appel; Court of the First Instance or Tribunal de Premiere Instance; Court of Administrative Law or Tribunal Administratif.

== Administrative divisions ==
French Polynesia has five administrative subdivisions (French: subdivisions administratives):

- Windward Islands (French: Îles du Vent or officially subdivision administrative des Îles du Vent) (the two subdivisions administratives Windward Islands and Leeward Islands are part of the Society Islands)
- Leeward Islands (French: Îles Sous-le-Vent or officially subdivision administrative des Îles Sous-le-Vent) (the two subdivisions administratives Windward Islands and Leeward Islands are part of the Society Islands)
- Marquesas Islands (French: (Îles) Marquises or officially subdivision administrative des (Îles) Marquises)
- Austral Islands (French: (Îles) Australes or officially subdivision administrative des (Îles) Australes) (including the Bass Islands)
- Tuamotu-Gambier (French: (Îles) Tuamotu-Gambier or officially subdivision administrative des (Îles) Tuamotu-Gambier) (the Tuamotus and the Gambier Islands)

note: Clipperton Island (French: Île de Clipperton), just off the coast of Mexico, was administered by France from French Polynesia.

== International organization participation ==
ESCAP (associate), FZ, ITUC, SPC, WMO

== See also ==
- 2004 French Polynesian legislative election
