= Nicole Bouteau =

French Polynesian politician (born 1969)

Nicole Boutea
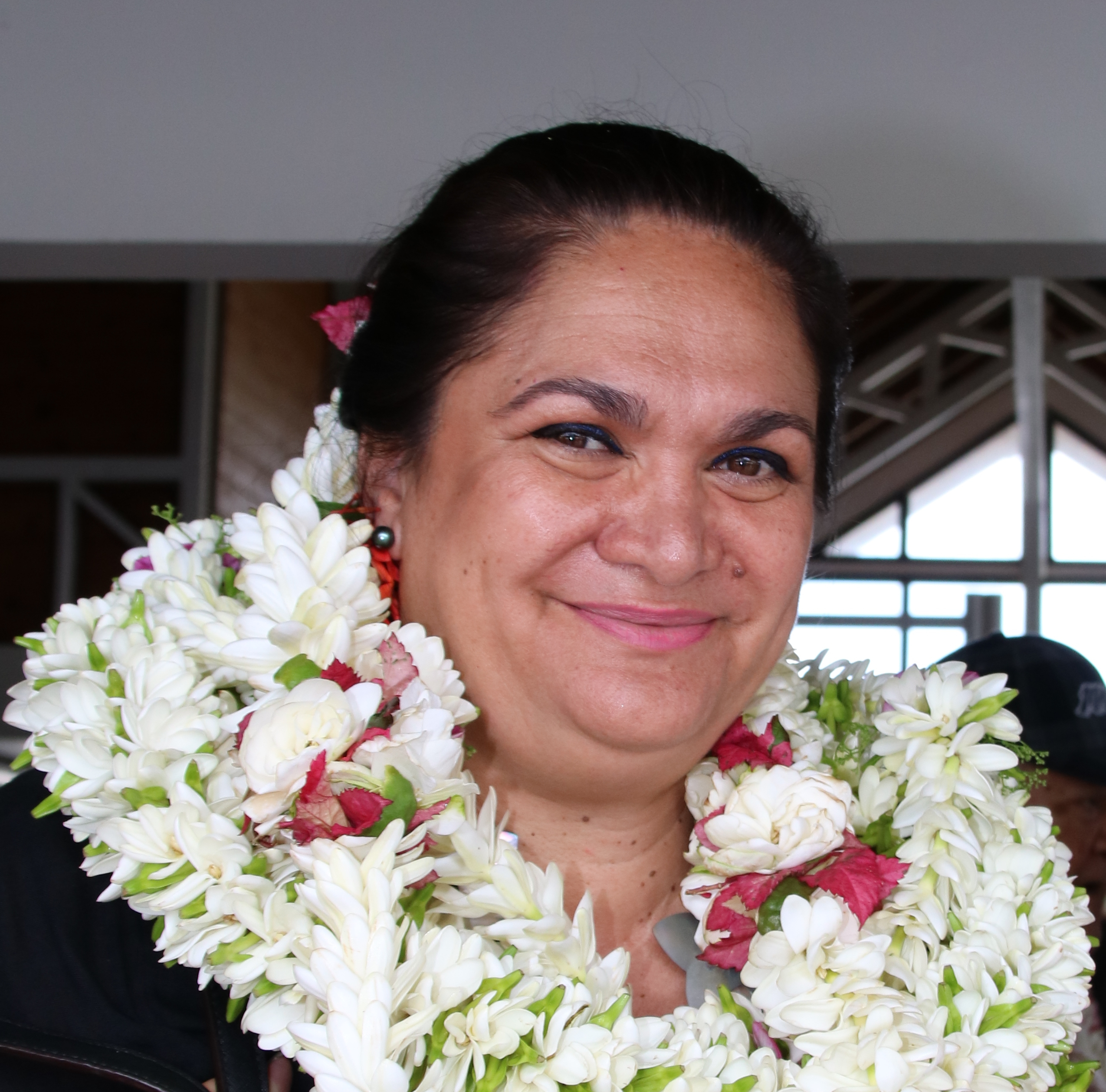
- Bouteau in 2017

Personal details
- Born: 1969 (age 56–57)
- Party: Ia Ora te Nuna'a; Tapura Huiraatira; Alliance for a New Democracy; No Oe E Te Nunaa

Nicole Bouteau (born 1969) is a French Polynesian politician. She is a member of the Assembly of French Polynesia and a former Minister of Tourism. She is the daughter of artist Fauura Bouteau.

== Education ==
Bouteau has a masters degree from the University of French Polynesia.

== Political career ==
Bouteau is a member of the Assembly of French Polynesia, representing the Windward Islands (Iles du vent) in 2003-2008 and since May 2013. She is a member of the Tapura Huiraatira party but has previously been a member of Rassemblement pour une majorité autonomiste and A Ti'a Porinetia. In April 2003 she founded the No Oe E Te Nunaa party. At the 2004 election president Gaston Flosse lost his majority, and Bouteau sided with pro-independence leader Oscar Temaru. Following the collapse of Temaru's government she united with Philip Schyle to contest the Windward Islands by-elections as the Alliance for a New Democracy (ADN). As ADN leader she voted to topple Flosse's government, but abstained on the presidential vote which followed. In August 2006 she was forced to vacate her seat in the Assembly due to election funding irregularities. Following her disqualification she ran for the French National Assembly, but was unsuccessful. She subsequently contested the 2008 election as the leader of No Oe E Te Nunaa. The party was the only party to cross the 5% threshold in the first round of voting, but refused to form an alliance for the second round, and failed to win any seats.

In 2009 she ran for a seat in the European Parliament.

She held the position of Minister of Tourism in 2001-2002 and 2017-2021 (Ministre du Tourisme et de l’Artisanat traditionnel March–May 2001; Ministre du Tourisme, de l’Environnement et de la Condition féminine, March 2001-April 2002; Ministre du Tourisme, des Transports internationaux, chargée des Relations avec les institutions, January 2017-May 2018; Ministre du tourisme, du travail en charge des transports internationaux et des relations avec les institutions, May 2018-November 2021. She resigned in November 2021 in protest after Tearii Alpha, a minister opposing government policy on Covid vaccination, was allowed to stay in the government.

She is also a member of the municipal council for the commune of Papeete, the capital city of French Polynesia, elected most recently in June 2020.

In the 2022 French legislative election, she contested French Polynesia's 1st constituency but lost to Tematai Le Gayic.

In September 2022 she joined Teva Rohfritsch and Philip Schyle in resigning from Tapura Huiraatira, citing disappointment with Edouard Fritch's government. In December 2022 she and Rohfritsch founded the Ia Ora te Nuna'a party.
