= Taivini Teai =

French Polynesian politician

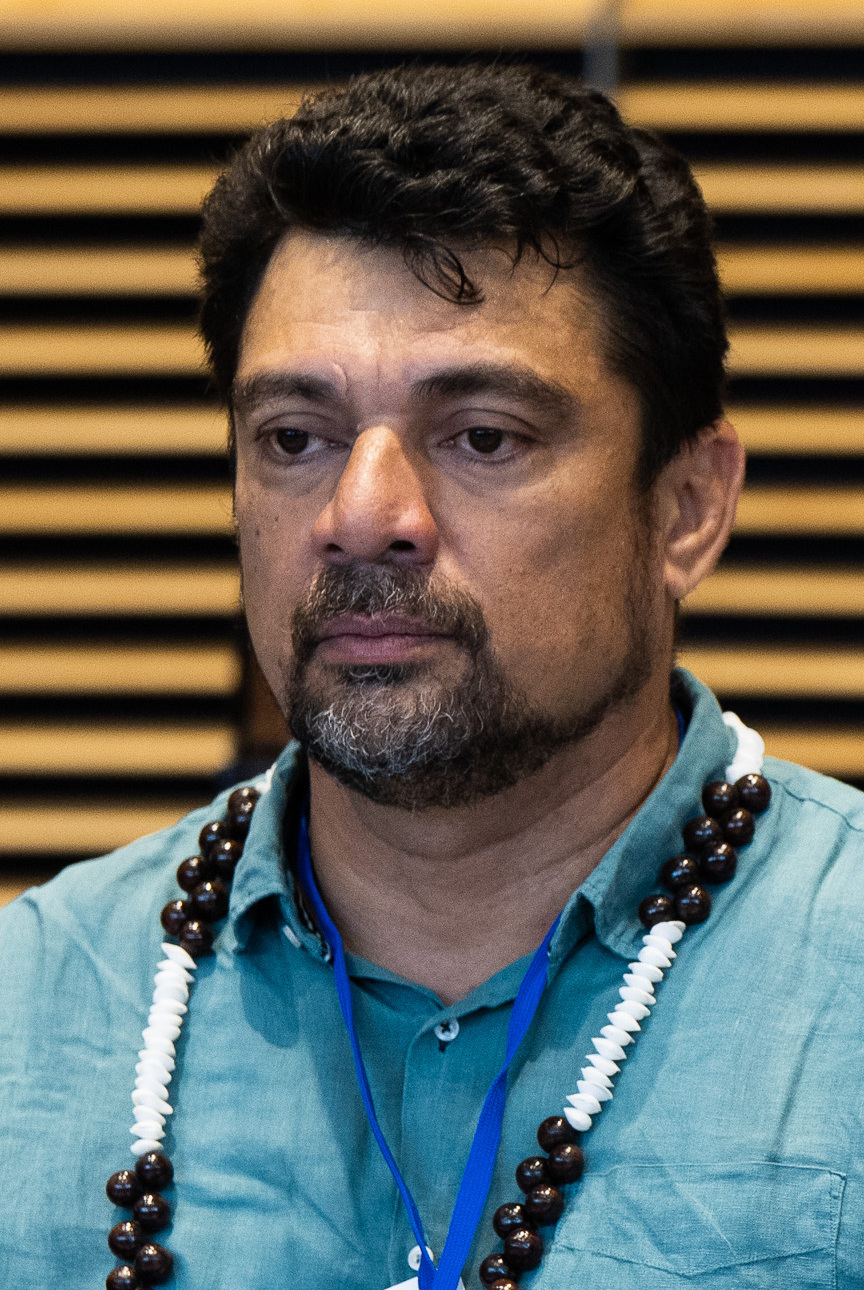
- Taivini Teai in 2024

Minister for the Primary Sector
- Incumbent
- Assumed office 15 May 2023
- President: Moetai Brotherson
- Preceded by: Tearii Alpha

Minister of Research
- Incumbent
- Assumed office 15 May 2023
- Preceded by: Tearii Alpha

Personal details
- Party: Tāvini Huiraʻatira

Taivini Teai is a French Polynesian scientist, politician, and Cabinet Minister. He is a member of Tāvini Huiraʻatira.

Teai was educated at the French Pacific University, graduating in 1996 with a doctorate. After completing a post-doctoral fellowship at the Malardé Institute he joined the university as a chemistry lecturer in 1998. His research includes work on the flavour of Tahitian vanilla. In 2011, following the resignation of Louise Peltzer, he unsuccessfully stood for president of the university, losing to Eric Conte.

On 15 May 2023 he was appointed Minister for the Primary Sector, in charge of Research, in the government of Moetai Brotherson.
