= Jean-Claude Teriierooiterai =

Tahitian linguist and anthropologist

Jean-Claude Teriierooiterai (1952 — 22 October 2020) was a French Polynesian linguist and anthropologist. An advocate of the Tahitian language, he was a member of the Tahitian Academy.

Teriierooiterai grew up in Papenoo on the island of Tahiti, and was the grandson of Norwegian trader Bjarne Kroepelien. At the age of 14 he was sent to school in New Caledonia, where he encountered the Wallisian language and wrote a Wallisian - Tahitian - French lexicon. He graduated with a degree in electrical engineering from the Lycée technique de Nouméa, then returned to Tahiti.

He worked as professor of Polynesian Culture at the University of French Polynesia and was president of the Fa’afaite-Tahiti Voyaging Society.

In 2013 he defended a doctoral thesis on Polynesian navigation, on Myths, astronomy, time division and traditional navigation: the Oceanian heritage contained in the words of the Tahitian language.

On 10 June 2013 he was inducted into the Tahitian Academy.

In 2014 he worked with Marguerite Lai and the Artistic Conservatory of French Polynesia to produce Te Feti’a Avei’a, a dance production about the journey of a Polynesian canoe. In 2019 his show Te Aho Nunui won the Heiva i Tahiti best author award.

Teriierooiterai died in Paris in October 2020. His book Le fabuleux voyage de la langue tahitienne ("The Fabulous Journey of the Tahitian Language") was published posthumously in 2022.
