= Joseph Pokossy Doumbe =

Cameroonian pharmacist and politician (1932–2021)

Member of the National Assembly of Cameroon
- In office 1970–1973

Municipal Councilor of Douala
- In office 1962–1977

Personal details
- Born: Joseph Dipita Pokossy Doumbe; 21 August 1932 Kaduna, Colony and Protectorate of Nigeria
- Died: 28 April 2021 (aged 88)
- Party: CPDM

Joseph Pokossy Doumbe (21 August 1932 – 28 April 2021) was a Nigerian-born Cameroonian politician and pharmacist.

== Biography ==
Born in Kaduna, Nigeria to Cameroonian parents, Doumbe moved to Douala with his widowed mother at the age of 7. In 1949, he left for France to attend the Collège Jules Ferry in Coulommiers and the Lycée Michelet in Vanves. In 1959, he graduated from the Faculté de pharmacie de Paris after interning at a hospital in Limeil-Brévannes.

In 1960, Doumbe returned to Cameroon and received 1 million CFA francs to open a pharmacy. He opened Douala's second pharmacy, after Mayor Rodolphe Tokoto had opened the first. He served as President of the Syndicat des pharmacies du Cameroun, the Conseil de l’ordre des pharmacies, and the Association pharmaceutique Interafricaine.

Doumbe began his political career in the 1960s. He was elected to the Municipal Council of Douala in 1962, serving until 1977. He was then elected to the National Assembly on 7 June 1970, where he stayed until 1973. On 6 November 1987, he was appointed 1st Deputy Delegate of the Government of Douala. He was also a member of the Cameroon People's Democratic Movement political bureau. Additionally, he was President of the Conseil d'Administration des Aéroports du Cameroun.

The husband of a fellow politician, Doumbe had nine children. He died on 28 April 2021 at the age of 88.
