= Raymond Bagnis =

French medical doctor (1932–2023)

Raymond Bagnis (17 May 1932 – 19 July 2023) was a French medical doctor who practiced in French Polynesia for fifty years, during which he did significant research on Ciguatera fish poisoning. He was also a founder of the Proscience Te Turu ‘Ihi Association, and served as President of the French Polynesia Council of Physicians in 2019.

== Life and career ==
Raymond Bagnis was born in Nice on 17 May 1932. He trained as a medical doctor at the École du service de santé des armées de Bordeaux, graduating in 1959. He was then sent to Mauritania, where he worked in the mobile hygiene service for three years. In 1963, he moved to French Polynesia. After working in the Gambier Islands, he joined the Malardé Institute in 1967, leading their research on Ciguatera and becoming a leading expert on the disease.

Bagnis retired from the institute in 1990. He then lectured at French Pacific University, before returning to medical practice. In 1992 he founded the Proscience Te Turu ‘Ihi Association to promote science to the public, and played a strong role in its annual science festival. He finally retired in 2012. In June 2016 he was made a commander of the Order of Tahiti Nui.

In May 2019, following the resignation of Gilles Soubiran, he was appointed president of French Polynesia's Council of Physicians.

Raymond Bagnis died on 19 July 2023, at the age of 91.
