= Lycée Michelet =

Lycée Michelet may refer to one of several French high schools/sixth form colleges named after Jules Michelet:

- Lycée Michelet (Brive-la-Gaillarde), Brive-la-Gaillarde, Corrèze
- Lycée Michelet (Lannemezan), Lannemezan, Hautes-Pyrénées
- Lycée Michelet (Marseille), Marseille, Bouches-du-Rhône
- Lycée Michelet (Montauban), Montauban, Tarn-et-Garonne
- Lycée Michelet (Nantes), Nantes, Loire-Atlantique
- Lycée Michelet (Nice), Nice, Alpes-Maritimes
- Lycée Michelet (Vanves), Vanves, Hauts-de-Seine
