= Mireille Chinain =

Marine scientist

Mireille Chinain is a French Polynesian marine scientist at the Malardé Institute. She headed research of ciguatera at the institute.

== Life ==
Chinain is a graduate of the French National Centre for Scientific Research and the University of French Polynesia.

From 1990 to 2000, Chinain was a scientist in the medical oceanography unit at the Malardé Institute in Tahiti, French Polynesia. In 2000 Chinain was appointed head of the ciguatera research program at the institute. Research in her laboratory focuses on the ecology, biodiversity, taxonomy and systematics of the ciguatera-causing dinoflagellate Gambierdiscus, and developing of methods for toxin detection. Chinain and her team also manage field monitoring programs throughout French Polynesian lagoons and the Pacific region, and Chinain manages the epidemiological survey of marine biotoxins intoxications for French Polynesia.

== Recognition ==
Chinain has received the Tyge Christensen Award (2010, from the International Phycological Society), the Albert Sézary Award (2006, from the Académie Nationale de Médecine, Paris, France) and the Tregouboff Award in Marine Biology (2005, from the Académie des Sciences, Paris, France).

== Publications ==
- Intoxications Par Biotoxines Marines, European University Edition EUE, 2011
