= Samuel Raapoto =

Samuel Raapoto (22 May 1921 – 15 June 1976) was a French Polynesian religious leader, who from 1963 until his death was first president of the Maohi Protestant Church. He was a founding member of the Tahitian Academy. He was the father of politician and academic Jean-Marius Raapoto, linguist Turo Raapoto, and journalist Etienne Raapoto.

Raapoto was born in Tevaitoa, on the island of Raiatea, in a Protestant family. After training at the pastoral school in Tahiti, he became pastor of the parish of Mahaena, then of the island of Makatea, while being employed at the Compagnie des Phosphates de l'Océanie. He then studied theology in Strasbourg before returning to French Polynesia.

In 1963, he became the first president of the Evangelical Church of French Polynesia, and remained so until his death on 15 June 1976, giving his function at the head of this Protestant church a recognized prestige. He worked in particular to unify the liturgy of this church. Finally, he took care to forge relations with international Protestant organizations.

He was also a founding member of the Tahitian Academy, Fare Vāna'a, and temporarily provided it with space at the headquarters of his Church in its early years.

He died of a heart attack on 15 June 1976.

== Tributes ==
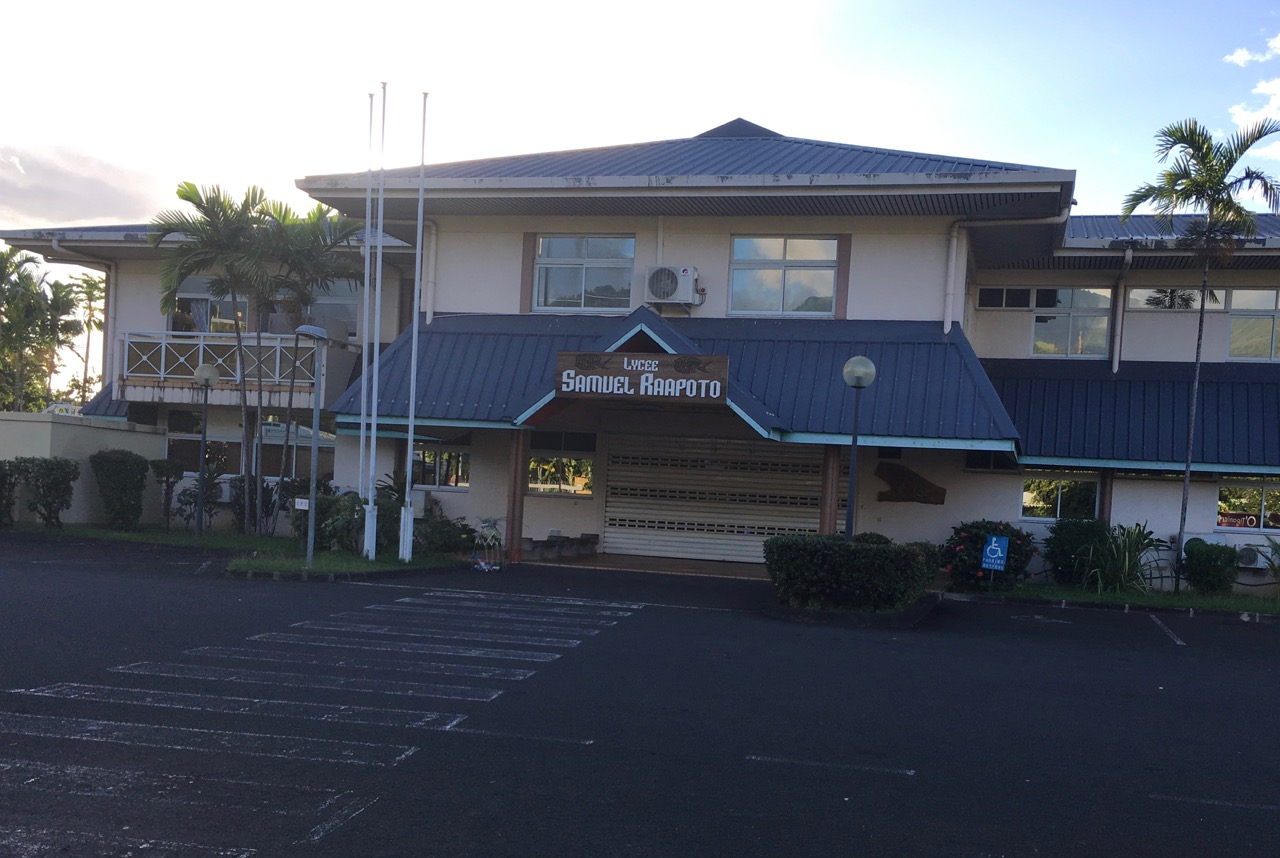
Lycée Samuel Raapoto

A stamp bearing his likeness was issued in 1988. In 2000, a high school of the Ma'ohi Protestant Church was named after him.
