= Order of Tahiti Nui =

Order of Tahiti Nui Ordre de Tahiti Nui (French)
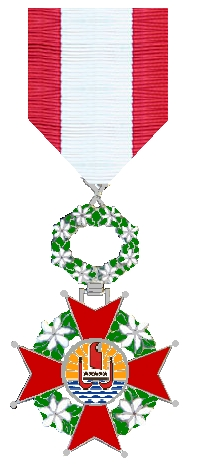

Awarded by French Polynesia
- Type: Territorial order of merit
- Established: 5 June 1996
- Eligibility: Must be of French nationality
- Awarded for: Outstanding merit in the service of French Polynesia
- Status: Currently Awarded
- Grand Master: President of French Polynesia
- Classes: Maximum number of members: 1 Grand-maître; 10 Grand(s)-croix; 40 Commandeur(s); 100 Officier(s); 300 Chevalier(s; plural form)
- Grand Croix Commandeur Officier Chevalier; Ribbons of the Ordre de Tahiti Nui

The Order of Tahiti Nui was established on 5 June 1996 by the Assembly of French Polynesia to reward distinguished merit and achievements in the service to French Polynesia.

== History ==
The Order of Tahiti Nui was established June 5, 1996 by resolution of the Assembly of French Polynesia. The Organic Law of 12 April 1996 granted a plan of autonomy to the territory of French Polynesia, allowing it to freely determine distinctive signs reflective of the islands' personality. The articles defining the order were adopted June 24, 1996 by Order No. 660 of the Council of Ministers of French Polynesia.

== Organization ==
=== Council of the Order ===
The organization and discipline of the order are provided by the Council of the Order consisting of three permanent members which are, by right, the President of French Polynesia, the President of the Assembly of French Polynesia, and the President of the Economic, Social and Cultural council. In addition, four recipients of the Order are nominated for five year terms. The Council deliberates on matters concerning the statutes of the Order. It also meets on appointments, promotions, and disciplinary issues of members. It certifies that appointments and promotions are made in accordance with regulations.

=== Grand Master ===
The President of French Polynesia is the Grand Master (Grand maitre) of the Order. He presides the Council of the Order that meets on his demand twice a year. He designates for a five-year term the four non-permanent members of the Council. In last resort, he decides for every matter concerning the Order.

The dignity of Grand Cross is conferred to the President upon entering office. He, at the investiture ceremony, is recognized as the Grand Master of the Order by the members of the Council. The large necklace is given to him by the oldest member of the Council by pronouncing the following words: "Mr. President of French Polynesia, we recognize you as Grand Master of the Order of Tahiti Nui". The insignia of the Grand Cross are, if necessary, handed to him, before the ceremony of investiture, by the oldest member of the council of the order.

=== Grand Chancery ===
The administration of the Order is handled by a Grand Chancery. It is headed by a Chancellor who is the Secretary General of the Government of French Polynesia. The Chancellor is also the keeper of the Seal of the Order.

He is tasked to present the Grand Master reports and projects on the future of the Order. He also presents candidates and nominees to promotion. In the events of a disciplinary action against a member, he is the one reporting it in the registries.

The Grand Chancery perceives, by right, for each certificate:

Rank	Amount
Grand-Croix	10,000 XPF
Commandeur	5,000 XPF
Officier	3,000 XPF
Chevalier	2,000 XPF

== Insignia ==
The insignia is a cross of four arms glazed in red enamel, terminating in a ball at each point. The arms are connected by a circular crown of Tahitian gardenia enameled in green and white. The obverse center of the cross shows the Coat of arms of French Polynesia colored by enamel in orange, red, and blue. The reverse has the inscription in relief: "Order of Tahiti Nui." The cross is suspended by another crown of Tahitian gardenia enameled in green and white. The ribbon is red with a wide central stripe in white.

Because of its nature of territorial order, the Order of Tahiti Nui has to be worn after the national orders (Legion of Honour, Order of Merit and Order of Liberation). During official celebrations, wearing the insignia is mandatory.

=== Chevaliers ===
The insignia of the Chevaliers, with a diameter of 45 mm, is nickel-plated; it is worn on the left side of the chest, attached by a white moire ribbon edged with red on each side of 37 mm width.

=== Officiers ===
The Officiers carry in the same place an insignia of the same diameter, gilded, attached by a ribbon similar to that of the Chevaliers, but including a rosette.

=== Commandeurs ===
The Commandeurs wear in saltire the gold insignia of 60 mm in diameter, surmounted by a bail, attached to the tie of 37 mm width.

=== Grands-Croix ===
The Grand Crosses carry in sling a large cord 101 mm wide over the right shoulder and below which is suspended a cross similar to that of the Commandeurs. In addition, they carry on the left side of the chest a plate or star with eight golden branches and radiated 88 mm, with, applied, the golden cross of the Commandeurs of 60 mm.

== Eligibility ==
To be received into the Order, the recipient must be of French nationality.

=== Members ===
The Order consists in three ranks (Chevalier, Officier, and Commandeur), and one dignity (Grand Cross). The maximum number of members of the Order is set to 450 holders distributed as follows:

- 300 Chevaliers
- 100 Officiers
- 40 Commandeurs
- 10 Grands-croix

Until the maximum number is reached, the annual appointments and promotions shall not exceed ten per cent of holders in each grade.

To be appointed or promoted, the recipient must justify the following:

- Chevalier: Minimum 15 years of services or activities of assorted distinguished merits.
- Officier: Minimum 7 years of seniority in the rank of Knight.
- Commandeur: Minimum 5 years of seniority in the rank of Officer.
- Grand-croix: Minimum 3 years of seniority in the rank of Commander.

The period of seniority starts the day insignias are awarded.

=== Non-members recipients ===
Foreigners who have distinguished themselves in the service of French Polynesia, whether or not they reside in the territory, may receive a distinction in the order of Tahiti Nui, within the limits of quotas, by period of three years. They are not members of the Order.

In periods of three years, the number of distinctions in the order of Tahiti Nui awarded to persons of foreign nationality may not exceed sixty-five recipients distributed in the following manner :

- 30 Chevaliers
- 20 Officiers
- 10 Commandeurs
- 5 Grands-croix

=== Ceremony ===
When the insignia is handed over by a person other than the President, the following words are addressed to the recipient: ° On behalf of the President and by virtue of the powers conferred on us, we make you (Chevalier, Officier or Commandeur) in the Order of Tahiti Nui." With regard to the dignitaries, the following formula is pronounced: "On behalf of the President and by virtue of the powers conferred on us, we raise you to the dignity of Grand-croix in the Order of Tahiti Nui."

== Selected recipients ==
=== Grand Cross (Grand-croix) ===
- Gaston Flosse, President of the Government of French Polynesia (conferred by right as Grand Master of the Order, 26 June 1996)
- His Majesty Tāufaʻāhau Tupou IV, King of Tonga (exceptional elevation, 4 March 1997)
- Jiang Zemin, General Secretary of the Chinese Communist Party and President of China (exceptional elevation, 3 April 2001)
- Gaston Tong Sang, President of French Polynesia (conferred by right as Grand Master of the Order, 20 June 2007)
- Édouard Fritch, President of French Polynesia (conferred by right as Grand Master of the Order, 14 September 2014)

=== Commander (Commandeur) ===
- Raymond Bagnis, medical doctor and Ciguatera researcher (June 2016)
- Andréa de Balmann, first Polynesian woman to qualify as a doctor (15 January 1997)
- Anne Boquet, High Commissioner of the Republic in French Polynesia (promoted 24 June 2008)
- Alain Christnacht, nuclear scientist (25 June 2021)
- Jacqui Drollet, former health minister and Assembly of French Polynesia president (January 1997)
- Robert Hervé, industrialist and politician (15 January 1997)
- Raphaëla Le Gouvello, navigator (appointed 3 November 2003)
- Henriette Kamia, disability activist (2 December 2022)
- John Martin, soldier, linguist, and founder of the Tahitian Academy (January 1997)
- Dominique Perben, former Minister of Overseas Territories (appointed 4 August 1999)
- Bernard Pons, Minister of State (appointed 30 December 1997)
- Edward Rudner, founder of Renaissance Cruises (30 August 1999)
- Philippe Séguin, Minister of State (appointed 10 April 2002)
- Apenera Short, Cook Islands Queen's Representative
- Nainoa Thompson, President of Polynesian Voyaging Society, Pwo navigator (promoted 26 June 2014)

=== Officer (Officier) ===
- Suzanne Chanteau, medical researcher (appointed 11 September 2019)
- Hubert Coppenrath, former archbishop of Papeete (24 June 2020)
- Flora Devantine, writer and educator (June 2007)
- Roger Doom, Assembly of French Polynesia president (June 2000)
- Hervé Le Cléac'h, former Bishops of Taiohae (15 January 1997)
- Jacques Maillot, former CEO of the airline "Corsair" (appointed 7 November 2001)
- Tony Marshall, German singer (appointed February 2009)
- Louise Peltzer, linguist and politician (June 2007)
- Rere Puputauki, former head of the Presidential Intervention Group (August 1999)
- Jean-Marius Raapoto, former Minister of education (appointed 25 April 2019)
- Maco Tevane, founding father of Tahitian theatre (June 2000)
- Pierre Vérin, academic (27 June 2002)

=== Knight (Chevalier) ===
- Alain Atger, police commander (July 2018)
- Naea Bennett
- Matahi Brothers, banker (December 2022)
- Jeanne Chane, vanilla merchant (July 2017)
- Michel Charleux, archaeologist (July 2018)
- Vaimalama Chaves
- Eliane Chungue, medical researcher (September 2019)
- Lucien Li, police commander (July 2018)
- John Mairai, poet, actor, and playwright (June 2020)
- Dominique Marghem, former head of the health department (June 2019)
- Etienne Raapoto, journalist (June 2020)
- Poenaiki Raioha, paddlesurfer (September 2014)
- Angelo Schirinzi, Trainer of Beach Soccer National Team at FIFA Beach Soccer World Cup in Tahiti 2013 (4. Place, losing the small final against Brasil in Penalty shoot-out 7-8). Tahiti is the first Pacific Islands nation to reach the knockout stage of a FIFA tournament. (October 2013)
- Yosihiko H. Sinoto
- Heimanu Taiarui, soccer player (October 2013)
- Angelo Tchen, soccer player (October 2013)
- Esther Tefana, singer (1998)
- Reynald Temarii, soccer player (October 2013)
- Charles Tetaria, athlete, language advocate, and former cabinet minister (June 2019)
- Jonathan Torohia, soccer player (October 2013)
- Mareva Tourneux, medical doctor (June 2014)
- Teva Zaveroni, soccer player (October 2013)
