= Turo Raapoto =

French Polynesian linguist, writer and theologian

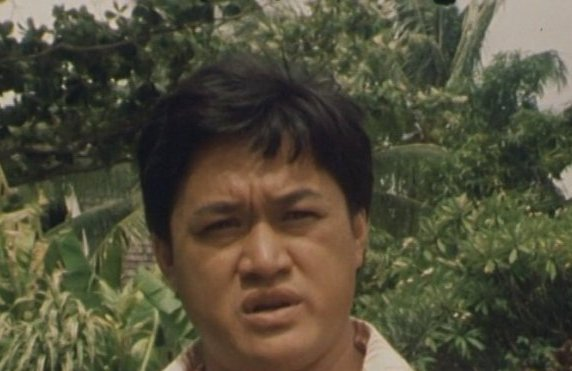
Turo Raapoto

Turo a Raapoto or Turo Raapoto (sometimes spelled Duro Raapoto) (16 March 1948 – 7 May 2014) was a French Polynesian linguist, writer and theologian. He was the son of religious leader Samuel Raapoto and the brother of academic Jean-Marius Raapoto and journalist Etienne Raapoto.

Raapoto was born in Raiatea. In 1975, he joined Jacqui Drollet and Henri Hiro to found Ia Mana Te Nunaa ("Power to the People"), a radical pro-independence party opposed to nuclear testing. His work on the Tahitian language and culture helped re-establish Maohi cultural identity. As a linguist he is notable for designing a graphical system for transcribing the Tahitian language. This system was also adopted for other languages of French Polynesia: in particular, it was adopted in 2001 by the Marquesan Academy, to transcribe the Marquesan language.

Raapoto was a member of the Maohi Protestant Church.
