= Tumahai =

Tumahai is a surname of Māori origin. Notable people with the surname include:

- Charlie Tumahai (1949–1995) New Zealand singer, bass player and songwriter
- Lisa Tumahai (born 1966), New Zealand iwi leader
- Rony Tumahai (1948–2018), French Polynesian politician
