= Etienne Raapoto =

Etienne Raapoto (born 19 March 1951) is a French Polynesian journalist and television presenter who presented the news in Reo Tahiti on Polynésie la 1ère for nearly 40 years. He is the son of former Maohi Protestant Church president Samuel Raapoto and the brother of academic Jean-Marius Raapoto and linguist Turo Raapoto.

Raapoto was born in Papeete and educated at Charles Viénot school. He then studied teaching and theology in France and Switzerland. Returning to French Polynesia, he trained education staff for the Protestant Church, and ran a youth center in Pirae while studying Reo Tahiti with Maco Tevane.

In 1983 he joined Polynésie la 1ère (then known as RFO) as its first bilingual journalist. In 1984, he presented the first news program in Tahitian. During his career with Polynésie la 1ère he contributed to the creation of Polynesian-focused and Reo Tahiti content, including the television programs Haumanava, Ha'amana'o na, Fare Ma'ohi and Tahi, Rua, Toru. He retired in April 2016, making his last news broadcast on Polynésie la 1ère on 7 April.

Following his retirement he was part of the team which translated the Disney film Moana into Reo Tahiti.

In June 2020, he was made a knight of the Order of Tahiti Nui.
