= Jacques Maillot (businessman) =

French businessman (born 1941)

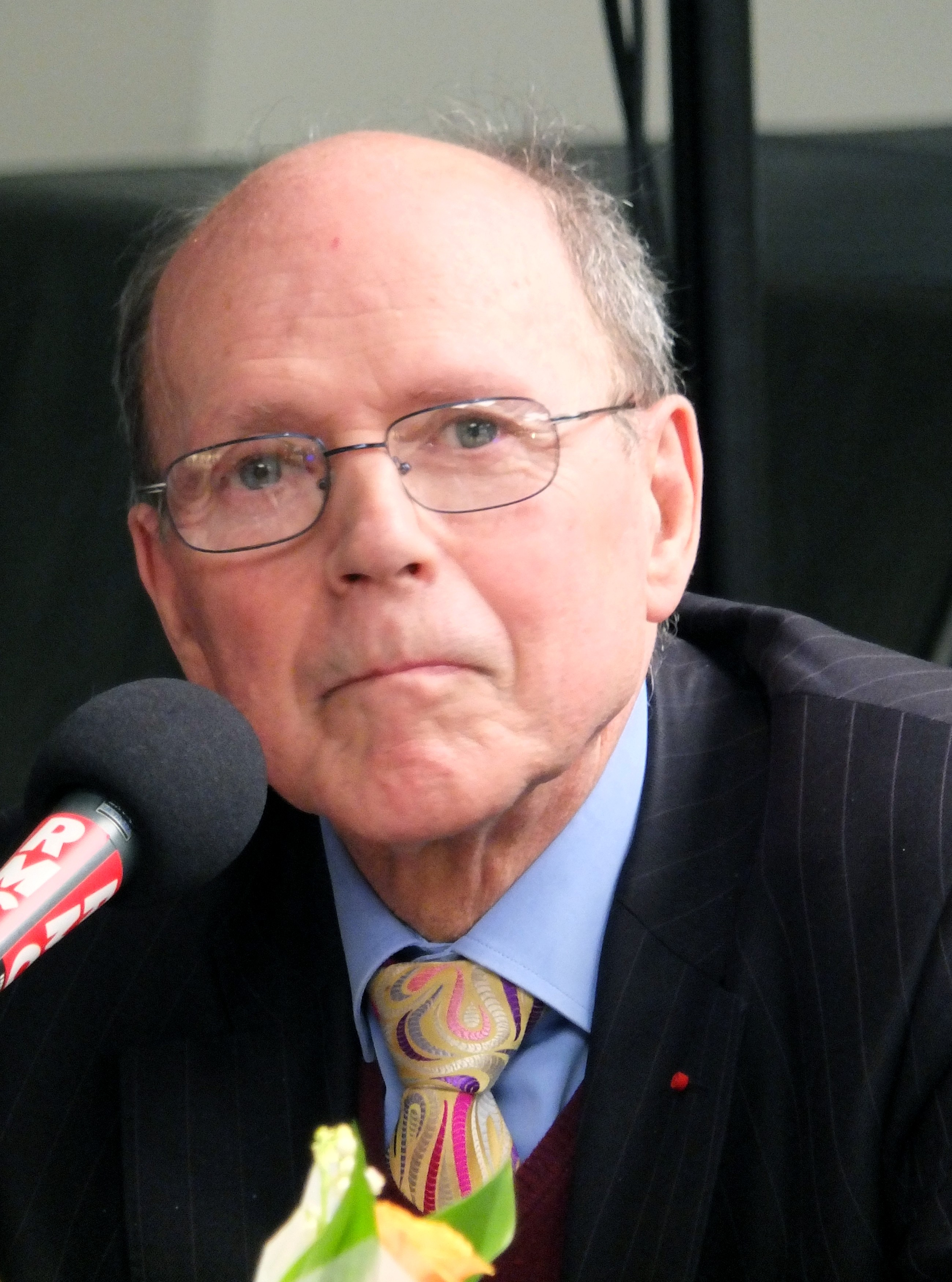
Jacques Maillot 2013

Jacques Maillot (French: [ʒak majo]; born 17 November 1941) is a French businessman. He is the founder of travel company Nouvelles Frontières and the airlines Corsair International and AeroLyon.

== Biography ==
Maillot was born in Issy-les-Moulineaux. During his childhood, he took on many responsibilities in Scouting. After completing a baccalaureate in philosophy at the Lycée Michelet in Vanves, he obtained a law degree. In July 1965, he organized a first trip to Morocco for 150 young people from the left bank of Paris.

In October 1967, with François Chevalier he set up a non-profit association under the name of Nouvelles Frontières to democratize travel and try to bring a cultural dimension. In 1968, the association became a limited company whose name evokes the democratization of travel for many French people, mainly to the islands of Overseas France and Corsica. He worked to build his company in the form of an integrated network including 200 agencies, two airlines, Corsair International and AeroLyon and a hotel chain, mainly in the Antilles. After having sold part of the company's capital to the German group Preussag in May 2001, he left the group's management in November 2001 due to disagreement with the strategy implemented by the new management. He maintained responsibilities as an administrator and consultant.

In February 2003, he was appointed by the Minister of Transport as administrator of the SNCF as a passenger representative.

On 7 April 2004, he became CEO of Eurotunnel after a very stormy general meeting which overthrew the old management with the help of Nicolas Miguet and a majority of small shareholders. On 18 February 2005, he decided to leave his position as chairman of the group; he resigned as a director on 4 March 2005.

He also created the humanitarian association Feu vert pour le développement and directs the magazine Témoignage Chrétien. He is also a member of the board of Compagnie des Alpes and sits on the board of Assicurazioni Generali France.

On 17 January 17, 2006, he invested 800,000 euros in the EasyVoyage group founded by Jean-Pierre Nadir alongside Francis Reversé, former boss of 3615 Degriftour, pioneer of electronic commerce in terms of travel sales.

== Honours ==
In 2001 he was made an officer of the Order of Tahiti Nui. In July 2002 he was made an officer of the Legion of Honour.
