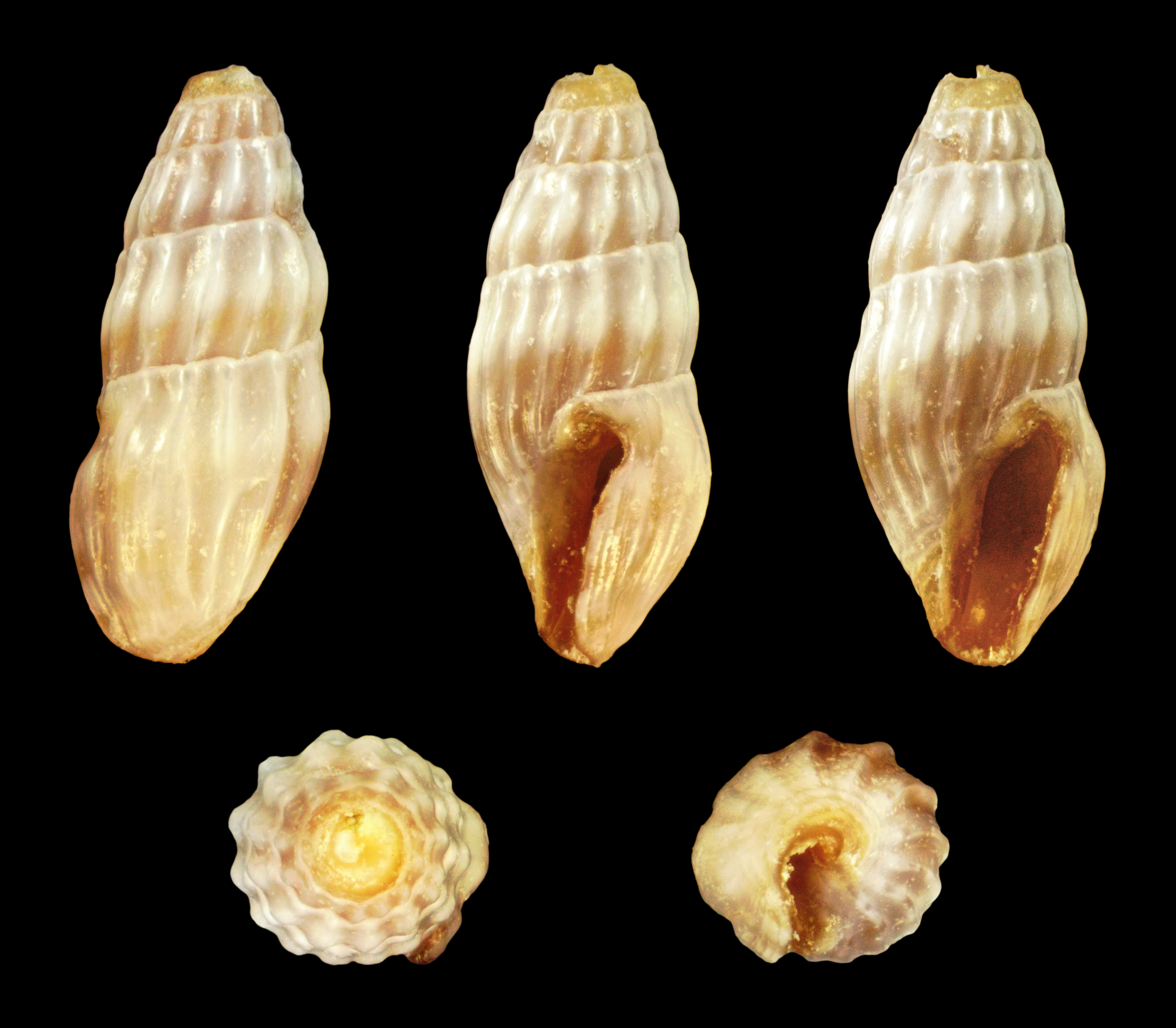
- A shell of Clavus pusilla

Scientific classification
- Kingdom: Animalia
- Phylum: Mollusca
- Class: Gastropoda
- Subclass: Caenogastropoda
- Order: Neogastropoda
- Superfamily: Conoidea
- Family: Drilliidae
- Genus: Clavus
- Species: C. pusilla

Binomial name
- Clavus pusilla (Garrett, 1873)

Synonyms
- Clavus (Tylotiella) pusilla (Garrett, 1873); Drillia exilis Pease; Drillia pusilla Garrett, 1873

= Clavus pusilla =

Species of gastropod

Clavus pusilla is a species of sea snail, a marine gastropod mollusk in the family Drilliidae.

== Description ==
The shell grows to a length of 7 mm. The whorls are nearly plane, longitudinally plicately ribbed. The ribs are small and close, descending from the sutures. The aperture is very short. The siphonal canal is short and open. The shell is reddish chestnut, the ribs whitish, with a dark band below the middle of the body whorl.

(Original description) The small, solid shell has an oblong, subfusiform shape. It is slightly shining, ashy white, the lower portion of the whorls grayish brown. The spire is rather long, convex in outline. The protoconch is subacute. The shell contains 6-7 convex whorls, slightly constricted beneath the suture. The body whorl is contracted at the base and furnished with a stout varix on the right side. The shell is longitudinally ribbed. These ribs are small, slightly oblique, somewhat flexuous, subangular, slightly nodulous next the suture, about 15 on the whorls of the spire. The base of the shell is spirally ridged and grooved. The short siphonal canal is rather widely open and truncate. The oblong-ovate aperture is light-brown and measures about one-third the length of the shell. The anal sinus is large and rounded. The peristome is rather sharp and furnished with a small sinus near the base.

== Distribution ==
This marine species occurs off Madagascar and in the demersal zone of tropical Pacific Ocean off the Philippines, Viti, Cook Islands & Paumotu Islands and off Taiwan.
