= Matahi Brothers =

French Polynesian businessperson (1961–2023)

Matahi Brothers (26 March 1961 – 2 May 2023) was a French Polynesian banker and company director, who was managing director of the SOCREDO bank from 2017 to 2022.

Brothers was born in New Caledonia and grew up in Papeete and Vairao on Tahiti. He studied at the University of Nice in France, graduating with master's degrees in management and accounting. He joined SOCREDO in 1987 as an account manager, and worked his way up through the ranks. From 2003 to 2006 he was director-general of OPT, before returning to SOCREDO to work as deputy chief executive. He also served as a director of Air Tahiti and Air Tahiti Nui. In January 2017 he was appointed managing director of SOCREDO, replacing James Estall. He retired from the position in 2022.

In December 2022 he was made a Knight of the Order of Tahiti Nui.
