= Rere Puputauki =

Léonard Colombel Puputauki, also known as Rere Puputauki, is the former head of French Polynesia's Presidential Intervention Group (GIP). Since being removed from office he has been convicted of manslaughter, abuse of public funds, and ignoring labour laws over actions taken while managing the GIP. Charges of kidnapping relating to the disappearance and murder of journalist Jean-Pascal Couraud are still pending.

In August 1999 he was made an officer of the Order of Tahiti Nui.

Following the election of Oscar Temaru as President of French Polynesia in 2005, Puputauki was replaced as head of the GIP. He subsequently led the organisation in a rebellion against the government, repeatedly blockading Tahiti's main port in an effort to prevent his replacement, gain new contracts, and destabilise the government. In October 2006, the GIP seized government buildings, including the territorial assembly and presidential palace. After being driven out by French gendarmes with tear gas they demanded the resignation of the French High Commissioner. In November 2006 he threatened further blockades.

In March 2010 he was convicted of ignoring labour laws over a scheme in which he used GIP staff to transfer tuna boats from China and South Korea to French Polynesia for his private fishing business. He was sentenced to one year in prison. The prison sentence was upheld on appeal in 2012.

In April 2010 he was sentenced to four years in prison for manslaughter over the 2003 sinking of the Tahiti Nui IV. In December 2019, the administrative court of French Polynesia ruled that he did not have to reimburse the government for compensation paid to the families of the victims.

In July 2013 he was charged with kidnapping and forcible confinement as part of an organised criminal gang over the 1997 disappearance and murder of journalist Jean-Pascal Couraud. In April 2014 Le Monde leaked wiretap recordings in which Puputauki discussed the murder of Couraud with two of his GIP subordinates. The wiretap evidence was thrown out by the Court of Cassation in January 2015. The charges are still outstanding.

In October 2016 he was convicted of abuse of public funds over his management of the GIP, and sentenced to a further 18 months imprisonment. In May 2017 he was convicted of abuse of trust over a failed property deal, and given a two-year suspended prison sentence. The sentence was upheld on appeal in 2018.
