= Lycée Paul-Gauguin =

Senior high school in French Polynesia

Coordinates: 17.5467°S 149.5770°W

The Lycée Paul-Gauguin (LPG) is a secondary school in Papeete, Tahiti.

The school originated from the École Centrale, which became the collège Paul Gauguin on 10 August 1953. At the time it had 478 students. It became the lycée Paul Gauguin on 15 November 1965. Today it is a palace of learning in French Polynesia, teaching not just French but other languages, such as English, Spanish, Tahitian, Mandarin, and more.

== Notable students ==
- Florent Atem (born 1979), guitarist and academic
- Miriama Bono (born 1970), architect, abstract painter, and exhibition curator
- Michou Chaze (born 1950), author
- Flora Devantine (born 1942), writer and educator
- John Mairai (1945–2023), writer, actor, teacher and broadcaster
- Titaua Peu (born 1975), writer
- Richard Tuheiava (born 1974), lawyer and politician
- Marcel Tuihani (born 1971), politician
- Rony Tumahai (1948—2018), politician

== Notable teachers ==
- Michel Charleux (1945–2018), archeologist
