= Carole Atem =

French Polynesian musician

Carole Atem (born 4 October 1982) is a French Polynesian musician and academic who works as a lecturer in French language and literature at the University of French Polynesia. She is the daughter of educator Felix Atem and sister of academic and musician Florent Atem.

Atem played the piano from age 8, and has been singing since age 14. She trained at the Vocal Institute of Technology in Hollywood, and recorded several albums with her brother. She initially trained to be a teacher, graduating in 2004 from the University of French Polynesia, and then teaching at Taaone College. She then studied at the Sorbonne Nouvelle University Paris 3, graduating in 2014 after completing a thesis on the memoirs of Gatien de Courtilz de Sandras. Her thesis was published as a book in 2018. She then worked as a lecturer at the UPF.
