= Andréa de Balmann =

Andréa de Balmann (24 April 1913 – 2007) was the first French Polynesian woman to qualify as a doctor. She was the mother of doctor Mareva Tourneux.

De Balmann was born on Makatea in the Tuamotus. Her father was the director of the French Phosphate Company there. Her mother died in the 1918 influenza pandemic when she was four years old, and at the age of 11 she was sent to France for her education. When the uncle she was staying with died, she was left alone in France. In 1936, she graduated as a dental surgeon, and in 1939, as a medical doctor - the first Polynesian woman to do so. After graduating, she returned to Tahiti, where she became involved in the conspiracy of the Mamao group to rally French Polynesia to the cause of Free France.

She was director of the maternity ward at Vaiame hospital, and later director of the Malardé Institute.

In 1972 she was made a knight of the Ordre national du Mérite. She was promoted to officer in 1981, and commander in 1990. In 1977 she was made a knight of the Legion of Honour. She was promoted to officer in 1997. In January 1997 she was made a Commander of the Order of Tahiti Nui.
