= Eric Conte =

Eric Conte (born 1956) is a French Polynesian historian and archeologist, who served as President of the University of French Polynesia from 2011 to 2017.

Conte is a professor of Oceanian ethnoarchaeology at the University of French Polynesia, specialising in the settlement of eastern Polynesia and the evolution of its pre-European societies. Since 2006 he has directed UPF's International Center for Archeological Research in Polynesia.

In June 2011 he was elected president of the UPF following the resignation of Louise Peltzer. He was re-elected as president in April 2013. In 2016 he oversaw the establishment of a center for human sciences in the Pacific. His term as president ended in April 2017, and he was replaced by Patrick Capolsini.

In May 2019 he edited Une histoire de Tahiti, des origines à nos jours ("A history of Tahiti, from its origins to the present day"), a collective work covering the history of eastern Polynesia.

In April 2023 he published Sur le chemin des étoiles ("On the way to the stars"), a work on Polynesian navigation.
