= Alain Atger =

French police officer

Lieutenant-Colonel Alain Atger (born 8 January 1961) is a French police officer serving in French Polynesia.

Atger was born in Gignac, Hérault. After serving in Pau, He was posted to French Polynesia in August 2015 as commander of the Papeete research section. He was replaced in October 2019 by Christelle Tarrolle.

In July 2018 he was made a knight of the Order of Tahiti Nui.
