= Esther Tefana =

French Polynesian singer (1948–2021)

Esther Tefana (27 October 1948 – 14 May 2021) was a French Polynesian singer. She made a name for herself in French Polynesian popular music.

Tefana was born in Papeete, French Polynesia. Shew grew up in a musical environment, her father having played alongside Bimbo, and recorded her first album, Anuanu, in 1964 at the age of 16. In the 1960s and 1970s she worked with Eddie Lund, and later with Patrick Noble. Alongside music, she worked in the tourist industry. From 1970 she spent five years in Africa. After returning to her homeland, she continued to sing. She has recorded 27 records, 14 of them on Océane Production.

In 1998 she was made a knight of the Order of Tahiti Nui.

Tefana died on 14 May 2021.
