= Henriette Kamia =

French Polynesian disability activist (born 1955)

Henriette Kamia (born 1955) is a French Polynesian educator and disability activist. She is president of the Te Niu o Te Huma federation.

Kamia was born on the island of Fatu-Hiva in the Marquesas Islands and was educated at école Sainte-Anne on Hiva Oa and Collège La Mennais in Papeete. She trained as a teacher, but went blind in her first year of teaching. After learning Braille in France she returned to Tahiti to teach visually-impaired students at the Center for Hearing and Speech Education in Pirae. In 1987 she became president of the Huma Mero federation. She has since served as president of the Polynesian Federation of Adapted and Disabled Sports, and vice-president of the Olympic Committee of French Polynesia. In 2015 she became president of the Te Niu o Te Huma federation.

In 2001 she was made a knight of the Order of Tahiti Nui. In December 2017 she was elevated to officer. In December 2022 she was elevated to the rank of commander. In 2010 she was made a knight of the Legion of Honour. In 2021 she was promoted to officer. She was awarded her medal in 2022.

In June 2023 she was awarded a Poerava award by the Union of French-speaking Women of Oceania.
