= William Robinson (sailor) =

William Albert Robinson (13 August 1902 – 16 January 1988) was an American sailor and author of travel books who founded the Malardé Institute in French Polynesia. He is the father of French Polynesian dancer and choreographer Tumata Robinson.

Robinson was born in Kenosha, Wisconsin. He was an only child raised by his mother, Ella Huegin. After graduating from polytechnic studies, he took a job in a textile factory in New York City.

Between 1928 and 1931 he circumnavigated the world on the small yacht Svaap. Later, on the same ship, he sailed to the Galápagos Islands to shoot a nature film there, but suffered a perforated appendix on the spot. While recuperating, he lost his yacht to Ecuador. He settled in Tahiti in the Ofaipapa valley. He later moved to Ipswich, Massachusetts, where he ran a small shipyard building fishing vessels.

During this time, he acquired a brigantine, which he named after his wife Florence C. Robinson. He made voyages on this ship with a small crew between the islands of the Indian Ocean, the Red Sea and the Mediterranean. During World War II, he built minesweepers, submarine chasers and landing craft at his shipyard.

After the end of the war, he returned to Tahiti and on the yacht Varua, which he built at his shipyard in Ipswich, sailed with a crew of several men to the South Pacific Ocean, calling at the Galapagos and Panama. When he returned to Tahiti, he found his friends there had contracted Elephantiasis. He assisted in founding a medical institution to fight the disease, which later became the Malardé Institute. As a result, he was awarded the Legion of Honour by the French government. He died in Tahiti in 1988.

== Publications ==
- 10,000 Leagues Over the Sea (1932) (this is the title used for U.S. editions)
- Deep Water and Shoal (1932) (this is the title used for U.K. editions)
- Voyage to the Galapagos (1936)
- To the Great Southern Sea (1956)
- Return to the Sea (1972)
- Gull Graves (2014 published posthumously)

== Comprehensive Chronology compiled from texts and newspaper clippings ==
- 1902 WAR "Robbie" born
- 1909 Florence Crane Robinson (1st wife) born
- 1912 Sally or Sallie Lancashire White Robinson (2nd wife) born
- 1928 Circumnavigates world on Svaap; finish Fall of 1931.
- 1931 Philomene Ah You Wan Kim born? (mother of WAR's first 3 daughters) - some say 1934; WAR writes (in To the Great Southern Sea) that she's 21 in 1950 when they leave Tahiti, but could be lying for purposes of perceived propriety
- 1932 "Deep Water & Shoal" (U.K.) aka "10,000 Leagues Over the Sea" (U.S.) published about Svaap circumnavigation, dedicated to WAR's mother.
- 1933 Marries FCR; August sets sail for Galapagos in Svaap with FCR; evacuated with appendicitis May
- 1934 Steamer to Tahiti with FCR, builds home in Ofaipapa
- 1935 Living in Tahiti; unclear if FCR with him
- 1936 "Voyage to Galapagos" published about trip with FCR, book dedicated to rescue crew.
- 1937 Returns to Massachusetts by steamer, presumably reconciles with FCR, opens Robinson's Boat Yard on Crane property
- 1938 Somehow gets to Ceylon and buys brigantine "Annapuranyamal," rechristens it Florence C. Robinson "Flossie", sails back to Mass via Red Sea & Mediterranean (this narrative is taken directly from Return to the Sea)
- 1938 Christopher Robinson (son) born to FCR (some say 1939). Flossie returns to the South Pacific as commercial cargo boat (stated in Return to the Sea)
- 1940 Starts building boats for the Navy until late in WWII
- 1941 In process of building Varua and at some point moves onto it.
- 1942 October FCR divorces WAR in Reno based on grounds of "extreme cruelty"; WAR married SLWR (2nd wife) in late 1942, both live on Varua in harbor.
- 1943 FCR "Princess Svetlana" marries Prince Serge Belosselsky-Belozevsky, b. 1898; they eventually have daughters Marina and Tatiana
- 1945 July Sails to Tahiti on Varua with SLWR and settles at Ofaipapa
- 1947 WAR and SLWR are given 7 year old Piho as foster child
- 1948 Establishes Malarde Institute to fight elephantitis, ciguatera, leprosy, zika and dengue; opens in 1949
- 1949 WAR working on establishing Malarde; "lends" Piho to foster parents in Hawaii
- 1951 SLWR leaves Tahiti for Europe; presumably divorces at some point. 12/31/51 WAR sails for Panama with pregnant PAYWK
- 1952 Circles Pacific in Varua with PAYWK and 11 year old Piho; 1st daughter Hina born in Panama
- 1954 2nd daughter Tumata born; becomes famous Tahitian dance performer and author
- 1955 3rd daughter Nona born 1955 or 1956
- 1956 "To the Great Southern Sea" published - discusses birth of Hina, dedicated to her.
- 1957 PAYWK dies in an asylum, reportedly of thorazine overdose
- 1958 Sails with 3 daughters to Thailand around 1957–58, just prior to and/or after PAYWK's death
- 1959 Marries May Man Shook Wong
- 1960 Rampa Robinson born (4th daughter) to MMSW
- 1969 FCR dies
- 1972 "Return to the Sea" published, dedicated to daughters Tumata, Nona and Rampa
- 1978 Prince SBB dies
- 1982 Christopher dies
- 1988 WAR dies
- 1992 Rampa marries wealthy Thomas duBois Hormel (b. 1930), becomes philanthropist and enivornmental activist. Marriage ends 2002, TDR dies 2019.
- 2008 September Tumata publishes "Comme deux navires qui se croisent dans la nuit" about her parents' relationship
- 2014 Daughters publish WAR's story "Gull Graves" reportedly found in his papers.
