= Rony Tumahai =

French Polynesian politician

Mayor of Punaauia
- Preceded by: Jacques Vii
- Succeeded by: Simplicio Lissant

Member of the French Polynesian Assembly for Windward Isles 3
- In office 4 June 2015 – 26 August 2018

Personal details
- Born: 7 September 1948
- Died: 26 August 2018
- Party: To Tatou Aia; Tahoera'a Huiraatira; Tāpura Huiraʻatira

Rony Tumahai (7 September 1948 — 26 August 2018) was a French Polynesian politician who served as Mayor of Punaauia and as a Member of the Assembly of French Polynesia.

Tumahai was educated at Lycée Paul-Gauguin before working as a teacher and then as a school manager at Manotahi elementary school in Punaauia. In 1995 he was elected to the Punaauia municipal council, becoming third deputy mayor, then first deputy mayor in 2001. He was elected mayor on a To Tatou Aia ticket in 2008.

He was first elected to the Assembly of French Polynesia in June 2015 as a Tahoera'a Huiraatira MP, when vacancies were created following the formation of the government of Édouard Fritch. In February 2016 he attended the founding congress of Tāpura Huiraʻatira and was elected one of the party's vice-presidents. He resigned from the party in March 2018 following a dispute over list rankings for the 2018 French Polynesian legislative election, and subsequently rejoined after being appointed head of its list in the Windward Isles 3 section. He was re-elected in the 2018 election.

He died on 26 August 2018 of a cerebral hemorrhage.
