= Raphaëla Le Gouvello =

French windsurfer (born 1960)

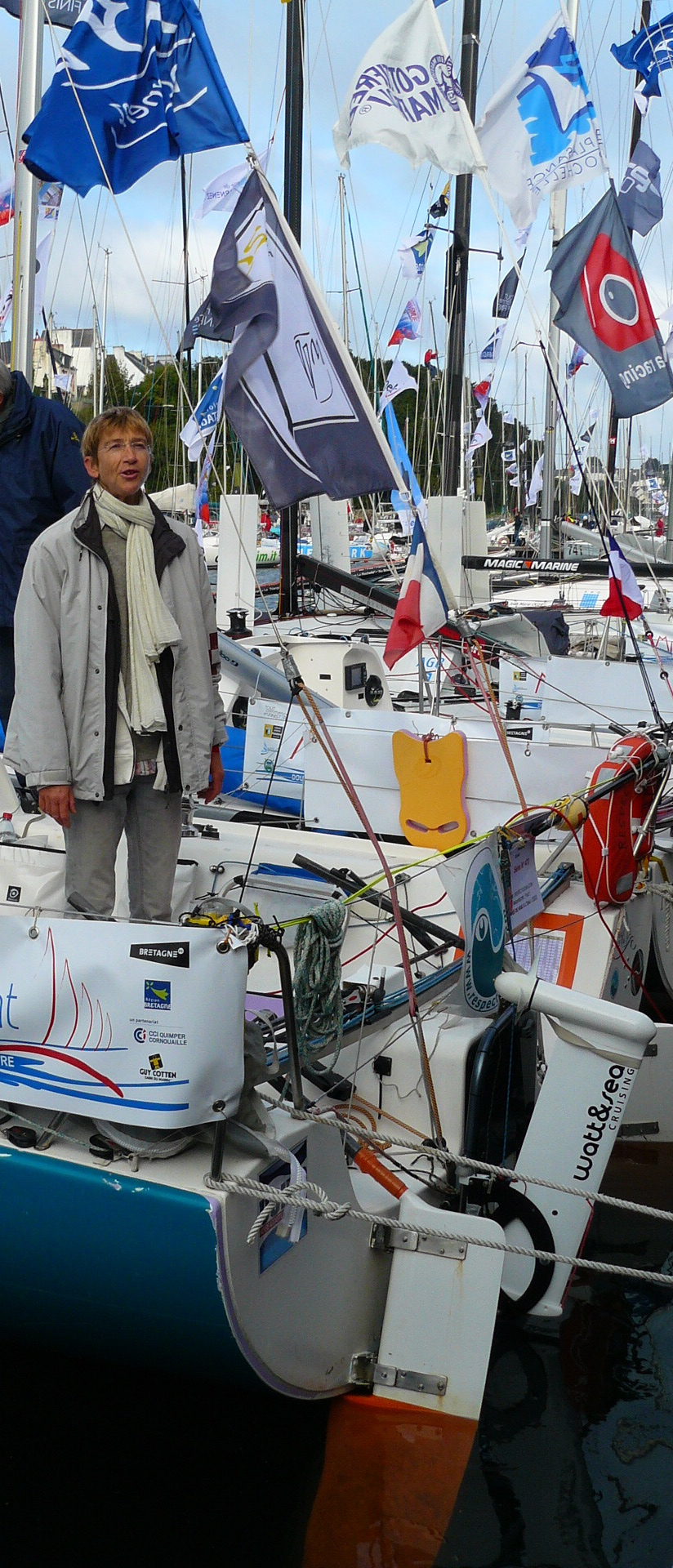
- Rafaëla le Gouvello in Douarnenez, a few days before the start of her first transoceanic boat race, the 2013 Transat 6.50.
- Born: 1960 (age 64–65); Paris, France
- Honours: Commander of the Order of Tahiti Nui

Raphaëla le Gouvello du Timat (born 1960) is a French windsurfer and conservationist. She has successfully completed four windsurfing crossings, solo and unassisted, of the Atlantic Ocean in 2000, the Mediterranean in 2002, the Pacific Ocean in 2003 and the Indian Ocean in 2006. She later founded the NGO Respect Ocean to protect the marine environment.

Le Gouvello was born in Paris and is of Breton descent. She initially trained as a veterinarian. She began windsurfing in 1976 and eventually competed at a national level.

In November 2003 following her passage from Peru to Tahiti she was made a Commander of the Order of Tahiti Nui.

In 2019 she completed a PhD on the circular economy in a small-scale fishery-dependent socio-ecological system through the University of Western Brittany's School of Marine and Coastal Sciences.
