= Jean-Marius Raapoto =

French Polynesian politician (1943–2025)

Minister of Education
- In office 12 February 2009 – 25 November 2009
- President: Oscar Temaru
- In office 23 February 2008 – 15 April 2008
- President: Gaston Flosse
- In office 3 March 2005 – 20 April 2006
- President: Oscar Temaru
- In office 17 June 2004 – 23 June 2004

Member of the French Polynesian Assembly for Unknown
- In office 6 May 2001 – 4 May 2013
- In office 16 March 1986 – 16 March 1991

Personal details
- Born: 1 January 1943 Papara, French Polynesia
- Died: 23 March 2025 (aged 82)
- Party: Ea no Maohinui; Tireo; Tāvini Huiraʻatira
- Relations: Turo Raapoto and Etienne Raapoto (brothers)
- Parent: Samuel Raapoto (father)

Jean-Marius Raapoto (1 January 1943 – 23 March 2025) was a French Polynesian educator, academic and politician who served as a Cabinet Minister. He was a major advocate for the Tahitian language, and served as Minister of Education in various governments between 2004 and 2009.

Raapoto was the son of religious leader Samuel Raapoto and the brother of linguist Turo Raapoto and journalist Etienne Raapoto.

== Background ==
Raapoto was born in Papara on 1 January 1943. After attending university in Dordogne he trained as a teacher at Normal school in Strasbourg. He worked as a teacher, then as principal of Charles Viénot school, before returning to France to pursue a degree in linguistics. He taught at Pomare IV college, before becoming its principal in 1980. He later worked for the department of education, where he was an advocate of the Tahitian language before becoming professor of Reo Mā’ohi at the University of French Polynesia. In 1996, he graduated with a doctorate in language science.

Raapoto died on 23 March 2025, at the age of 82.

== Political career ==
In 1985, he founded the Ea no Maohinui party, and he was elected to the Assembly of French Polynesia in the 1986 French Polynesian legislative election. He lost his seat at the 1991 election. He later formed the Tireo party. In 1998, he contested the election to the French Senate, losing to Gaston Flosse.

In June 2004, he was appointed Minister of Education in the cabinet of Oscar Temaru. He was reappointed when Temaru regained the presidency in March 2005, but surrendered his portfolio in April 2006 to return to the Assembly to shore up Temaru's majority. He was later reappointed, and oversaw the trial of English-language and te reo education to pre-schoolers.

Following the 2008 French Polynesian legislative election he was reappointed Education Minister in the coalition cabinet of Gaston Flosse, but resigned as a Minister in April 2008 after Flosse lost a confidence vote and Gaston Tong Sang became president. He rejoined the Assembly in July 2008. He rejoined cabinet again as Education Minister when Temaru returned to power in February 2009. He was not reappointed to Temaru's fifth cabinet in 2011, instead serving as chair of the Assembly's education committee.

After retiring from politics he worked for the town of Faaa, then moved to Niau in the Tuamotus where he opened a coconut oil mill.

In 2019, he was appointed an officer of the Order of Tahiti Nui.
