= Suzanne Chanteau =

French Polynesian medical researcher

Suzanne Chanteau (born 27 June 1952) is a French Polynesian medical researcher who directed the Pasteur Institute in New Caledonia from 2008 to 2013. She is notable for developing rapid diagnostic tests for plague, cholera, and bacterial meningitis.

Chanteau was born in Papeete. After studying biology in France, she worked at the Malardé Institute in Tahiti from 1975 to 1993, working on Ciguatera fish poisoningg and Lymphatic filariasis. In 1994 she began working for the Pasteur Institute, initially in Madagascar, where she worked on Tuberculosis and Plague. In Madagascar she developed a rapid diagnostic method for plague and a rapid test for Cholera. In 2002 she was appointed director of the Pasteur Institute's research center in Niger, studying Meningitis. Again, she developed a rapid diagnostic test for the disease. From 2008 to 2013 she was director of the Pasteur Institute in New Caledonia.

== Honours ==
In 1999 she was made a knight of the Ordre national du Mérite. In 2002 she was made a knight of the National Order of Madagascar. In 2007 she was made a knight of the Legion of Honour.

In September 2019 she was made an officer of the Order of Tahiti Nui.
