= Lucien Li =

Lucien Li (born 18 January 1961) is a French Polynesian police commander.

Li was born in Papeete. Summoned for military service in 1979, he joined the naval infantry battalion of Tahiti, and then was assigned to the 57th Pacific Command Battalion. In 1984 he attended the École de sous-officiers de la Gendarmerie nationale. In 1985 he was assigned to the mobile platoon in Papeete. In 1987, he helped suppress protests against French nuclear testing.

In 1994 he transferred to the National Gendarmerie, working in Pirae as a gendarme. He later served in Arue, Moorea, and the Tuamotus, before being assigned to the Papeete research brigade as an investigator. In 2007 he had risen to command the research section, and in this role he was responsible for identifying the victims of Air Moorea Flight 1121. After transferring to Paris, he returned to French Polynesia in 2012. In August 2014 he was appointed head of the Compagnie des archipels, the second Polynesian to hold the position.

In July 2018 he was made a knight of the Order of Tahiti Nui.

In December 2020 he was appointed as head of the reception and security service of the presidency.
