= Jeanne Chane =

French Polynesian vanilla trader

Jeanne Chane (born 31 August 1935) is a French Polynesian vanilla trader and the "single most powerful person in the Tahitian vanilla trade".

== Biography ==
Chane was born in Uturoa on the island of Raiatea and is of Chinese descent. Her family has been involved in vanilla production for three generations, and she took over the family business at the age of twenty.

In 1995, she was made a knight of the Order of Agricultural Merit. In 2008, she was promoted to officer. In July 2017, she was made a knight of the Order of Tahiti Nui.
