= Mareva Tourneux =

French Polynesian doctor

Mareva Tourneux (born 5 October 1952) is a French Polynesian doctor.

== Life ==
Tourneux was born in Pirae. She is the daughter of doctor Andréa de Balmann.

She studied at the University of Nancy in france, graduating as a doctor in 1979.

As a doctor, she developed family planning services in French Polynesia, and introduced free screening for breast and uterine cancer. In 2016, she worked as director of health, and chief of staff to the Minister of Health, Patrick Howell. In 2022 she is the head of a kidney dialysis centre in Mo'orea.

== Honours ==
In 2012 Mareva Tourneux was made a knight of the Ordre national du Mérite.

In June 2014 she was made a knight of the Order of Tahiti Nui.

In July 2018 she was made a knight of the Legion of Honour.
