= Michou Chaze =

Tahitian author (born 1950)

Michou Chaze (born 1950) is a Tahitian author writing in "Tahitian French", a localized variation of French. She is also known as Rai Chaze or Rai a Mai.

The daughter of a French father and Polynesian mother, she was born in Papeete. She was educated at the Lycée Paul Gauguin and then spent eleven years studying and then working as a fashion photographer in the United States but returned to her native island. In her writing, she rejects both colonial oppression and cultural nationalism.

Her stories have also appeared in Tahiti Pacifique.

== Selected works ==
Selected works:

- Vai la rivière au ciel sans nuages short stories (1990)
- Toriri poetry (2000)
- Contes Tahitiens children's stories (2009)
- Avant la saison des pluies novel (2010)
