= Dominique Marghem =

Dominique Marghem (born 28 November 1948) is a French medical doctor, who, who has spent his career working in French Polynesia. From 2010 to 2012 he served as director of French Polynesia's health department.

Marghem was born in Mitry-Mory in France. He trained as a doctor, and was sent to French Polynesia as part of his military service. He stayed in French Polynesia after completing his military service, and was recruited by the department of health. He worked on Bora Bora, and then on Raiatea, before being appointed chief medical officer for the Leeward Islands in 1989. From 1995 to 2001 he was deputy director of health. In 2010 he was appointed director of health. He retired in 2012.

In June 2019 he was made a knight of the Order of Tahiti Nui.
