= Mangareva language =

Oceanic language spoken in French Polynesia

Mangareva
- te reo magareva
- Native to: French Polynesia
- Region: Gambier Islands, Mangareva Island
- Ethnicity: 1,340 (2011 census?)
- Native speakers: 600 (2011 census)
- Language family: Austronesian: Malayo-Polynesian; Oceanic; Polynesian; Eastern Polynesian; Marquesic; Mangareva

Language codes
- ISO 639-3: mrv
- Glottolog: mang1401
- ELP: Mangareva
- Mangareva is classified as Severely Endangered by the UNESCO Atlas of the World's Languages in Danger.

Mangareva or Mangarevan (autonym te reo magareva, [te re.o ma.ŋa.re.va]; in French mangarévien) is a Polynesian language spoken by about 600 people in the Gambier Islands of French Polynesia (especially the largest island Mangareva) and by Mangarevians emigrants on the islands of Tahiti and Moorea, located 1,650 kilometres (1,030 mi) to the North-West of the Gambier Islands.

== Vitality ==
At the 2017 census, only 24.8% of the population age 15 and older in the Gambier Islands still reported that Mangarevan was the language they spoke the most at home (down from 38.6% at the 2007 census), while 62.6% reported French as the main language spoken at home (up from 52.3% at the 2007 census), 4.9% reported Tahitian (down from 6.4% in 2007), and 4.6% reported some Chinese dialects (predominantly Hakka) (up from 3.5% in 2007).

The ten years between 2007 and 2017, based on official census numbers, have seen a global decline in the number of Mangarevan-speaking adults (i.e. people aged 15 and older who reported that Mangarevan was the language they spoke the most at home):

- 300 in 2007 → 270 in 2017, in the Gambier Islands
- 50 in 2007 → 53 in 2017, on the islands of Tahiti and Moorea
- 424 in 2007 → 332 in 2017, across French Polynesia as a whole.

Speakers have some bilingualism in Tahitian, in which there is a 60% lexical similarity, and usually with French, as well. It is a member of the Marquesic subgroup, and as such is closely related to Hawaiian and Marquesan.

According to the Endangered Languages Project, Mangarevan is considered endangered with less than 900 speakers out of an ethnic population of 1,491. The larger portion of the population in the Gambier Islands speak French.

== History ==
Mangarevan primarily shares commonalities with Cook Islands Māori, New Zealand Māori, Marquesan and Tahitian. The linguistic similarity with the New Zealand Māori can be traced back to the 1834 arrival of a New Zealand man who acted as a translator for French missionaries. Cultural traits shared between the Mangarevan and Māori, like the story of Māui, can all be traced back to the New Zealander's arrival as communication was clear due to linguistic similarities.

The first explorers to document the people, traditions, and language of the Gambiers were the French who eventually annexed the islands in 1881. Similar to many Polynesian languages, Mangareva's written language differentiates from spoken language because it was transcribed by Europeans. French missionaries reportedly found it difficult to pronounce or recognize the glottal stop of Mangarevan; they chose to represent it in writing using the letter h. Colonial and missionary influences from the past and in the present day have been large contributors to the attrition of language.

Mangarevan is also subject to a historical process of tahitianization, the pressure exerted by the dominant Tahitian language.

== Phonology ==
Mangarevan has nine phonemic consonants:

	Labial	Alveolar	Velar	Glottal
Nasal	m	n	ŋ ⟨g⟩	
Stop	p	t	k	ʔ ⟨ꞌ, h⟩
Continuant	v	r		

And five vowels:

	Front	Back
High	i	u
Mid	e	o
Low	a	

The absence of *s is shared with most Polynesian languages; the absence of *f is a characteristic shared with Rarotongan, Ra'ivavae and Rapa Iti.

Mangareva's phonology has been identified as a Marquesic derivative from Proto-Eastern Polynesian (PEP) and Proto-Central Eastern (PCE).

Doublets, words that have different phonological forms but the same etymological root, are more common in Mangarevan language in comparison to any other Eastern Polynesian culture. For example, a PEP doublet like fafine ('woman') becomes ʻaʻine in Mangarevan. Furthermore, a modern Mangarevan (MGV) doublet is veʻine ('married woman' or 'wife').

== Orthography ==
The Mangarevan language uses a Latin-script orthography:

Mangarevan alphabet
A a	E e	G g	H h / '	I i	K k	M m
[a]	[e]	[ŋ]	[ʔ]	[i]	[k]	[m]
N n	O o	P p	R r	T t	U u	V v
[n]	[o]	[p]	[r]	[t]	[u]	[v]

== Vocabulary ==
Since the vocabulary of the Mangarevan language was gathered half a century before English and French dialects and influences, the language is considered "pure" because of the lack of adopted foreign words. Many of the words found in Mangarevan are, however, influenced by other Polynesian languages since the time period of Mangareva's settlement paralleled the wayfaring period of other Polynesian cultures. The transformation of the Gambier Islands to a Catholic religion was the only new implementation to the native vocabulary as a new religious vocabulary had to be constructed in order to encompass new concepts.

== Comparison with other Polynesian languages ==
In terms of consonants, Mangarevan shares linguistic similarities with Cook Islands Māori, Paumotu, Tuamotoan, Rarotongan, as well as New Zealand Māori.

Similarities between Mangarevan, Rarotongan and Tahitian include the nominalizing suffix -ranga in place of -anga, and the plural marker mau.

One difference between Mangarevan and Marquesan, is that the consonant *r became a glottal stop in Marquesan: for example, 'candlenut' is rama in Mangarevan, but ʻama in Marquesan. As far as this phoneme is concerned, Mangarevan is conservative (just like Tahitian or Pa'umotu), whereas Marquesan is innovative.

The Gambier Islands were also probably located on the settlement routes towards Rapa Nui further East. Southern Austral migration from Rapa Nui to Mangareva in the 1300s characterized one of the final acts of Early Polynesian expansion. Therefore, the language of Rapa Nui shares a lot of vocabulary with Mangarevan.
