= Bruno Saura =

French anthropologist (born 1965)

Bruno Saura (born 5 August 1965) is a French anthropologist. Since the 1990s, he has been the author and regular contributor to numerous works on Polynesian culture. He is a professor of Polynesian civilization at the University of French Polynesia. His published works include a biography of Tahitian independence leader Pouvanaa a Oopa and a history of Rurutu.

Saura was born in Metz, in the Moselle region of France. He moved to French Polynesia in 1979 when his father, a police officer, was transferred there. From 1982 to 1986, he studied anthropology in France and then returned to Polynesia to continue his research in Huahine. After defending his thesis in Political Science at the Aix-Marseille University, he was appointed lecturer in Polynesian Civilization at the University of French Polynesia (UPF) in 1993. In 2006 he was appointed a professor at the UPF.
