= Henri Hiro =

Henri Hiro (1 January 1944 - 10 March 1990) was a poet, playwright and film director from French Polynesia. He was a pioneer of Polynesian poetry and theatre.

== Biography ==
Hiro was born on the island of Moorea. He studied theology in Montpellier and returned to Tahiti in 1972, but was not ordained a priest. According to his vision he came from a colonized society and wanted to return to traditional Polynesian values, and he worked to promote the Tahitian language, as well as his own culture and identity.

Hiro was also involved in the defense of the environment. He was one of the promoters of the association Ia ora te natura, and a leader of opposition to French nuclear testing. In 1975, he joined Jacqui Drollet and Turo Raapoto to found Ia Mana Te Nunaa ("Power to the People"), a radical pro-independence party opposed to nuclear testing.

In 1979 he made his first film, Le Château, together with Jean L'Hôte. It deals with the loss of identity among young people in Tahiti. In Marae, 1983, he recreated a traditional royal enthronement ceremony. Te ora, which Hiro made with Bruno Tetaria in 1988, is a song to Polynesian nature, presenting fifteen species of trees to children. He also published two collections of poetry in Tahitian and mounted theatrical shows in which he integrated polyphonic songs, dances or traditional recitations.

Hiro died in Huahine on 10 March 1990.

== Honours ==
Collège Henri Hiro in Faʻaʻā is named in his honour. In 2017 a poetry competition for school students was established in his honour.

On the 20th anniversary of his death in 2010 the Maison de la Culture in Papeete held a series of exhibitions and film screenings. On the 30th anniversary of his death in 2020 the Artistic Conservatory of French Polynesia held a series of poetry readings and unveiled a commemorative plaque.

== Publications ==
- Pehepehe i taù nūnaa, Tupuna, 1985
- Taaroa, OTAC, Tahiti, 1984.

== Films ==
- Le Château (1979)
- Marae (1983),
- Te ora (1988), television series written by Henri Hiro and produced by Bruno Tetaria; 15 films for children dedicated to different Polynesian trees.
