= Anna-Bella Failloux =

French Polynesian entomologist

Anna-Bella Failloux is a French Polynesian entomologist who is a professor of medical entomology at the Pasteur Institute.

Failloux was born on Raiatea and grew up on Tahiti. She studied plant physiology at Paul Sabatier University in Toulouse, before completing a thesis on the parasitic worms responsible for Lymphatic filariasis at Paris-Sud University. She then worked at the Malardé Institute before joining the Pasteur Institute in 1994. Since 2011 she has been director of research on arboviruses and insect vectors. Her work has covered Bancroft's filariasis, Dengue fever, and Chikungunya.

In January 2015 she was made a knight of the Legion of Honour for her work on mosquito-borne diseases.

In February 2019 she was promoted to professor at the Pasteur Institute.
