= Flora Devantine =

Tahitian author

Flora Aurima-Devatine (born October 15, 1942) is a Tahitian writer and educator. She publishes under her married name of Flora Devatine.

She was born Flora Aurima in Pari on the Tautira peninsula and was educated at the Lycée Paul Gauguin, continuing her studies in France where she received her baccalauréat and pursued studies in Spanish. She taught Spanish at the Lycée Collège Pomare IV from 1968 to 1997 and taught subjects including Polynesian poetry at the University of French Polynesia from 1987 to 1995. From 1979 to 1984, she served as State Commissioner for women's issues (Déléguée d’État à la Condition Féminine). From 2002 to 2006, she served as director for the cultural journal Littérama’ohi, Ramées de Littérature Polynésienne; she was head of the editorial board for the journal until 2010.

Aurima-Devatine writes traditional poetry in the Tahitian language and free verse in French. She has been a member of the Tahitian Academy, since it was created in 1972.

Her 2016 collection of poetry Au Vent de la piroguière – Tifaifai received the Prix Heredia by the Académie française in 2016. She was subsequently named a director of the Te Fare Vānaʻa.

In June 2007 she was appointed an Officer of the Order of Tahiti Nui.

== Selected works ==
- Vaitiare, Humeurs (1980)
- Tergiversations et rêveries de l’écriture orale: Te Pahu a Hono’ura. Papeete (1998)
