= Tahitianization =

Tahitianization is a term used to describe a situation where the Tahitian language influences on other nearby Polynesian languages. The phenomenon is most prevalent in the French Polynesia, but is not limited to that area alone. One notable factor in the process of tahitianization was that when king Pōmare II converted into Christianity and later started to spread the new religion into other communities near Tahiti.

In French Polynesia, the lesser-spoken languages are exposed to the tahitianization. This has influenced on the vitality of Mangareva language. Also, the Tuamotuan language has been greatly influenced by the Tahitian language. Out of all the languages in the French Polynesia, the languages of North Marquesan and South Marquesan have best managed to evade tahitianization.

The Rapa Nui language in the Easter Island has also been influenced by the Tahitian language, since many speakers moved into Tahiti at the start of the 19th century. The returning Rapa Nui brought many Tahitian influences with them: almost ten percent out of a word list of a little over 5,800 were from Tahitian.
