= Bjarne Kroepelien =

Norwegian wine merchant (1890–1966)

- Born: 3 May 1890; Bergen
- Died: 28 April 1966 (aged 75); Oslo
- Occupation: Wine merchant

Bjarne Kroepelien (born 3 May 1890 in Bergen, died 28 April 1966 in Oslo) was a Norwegian wine merchant who is best known for his large collection of books on the Polynesian Islands. It was this book collection that sparked Thor Heyerdahl's interest in Polynesia and inspired his first theories on the contact between these islands and South America.

== Life and work ==
=== Background ===
Bjarne Kroepelien was born in Bergen as the eldest of four children to his parents Jacob Valentin Kroepelien (1863–1926) and Dagny Gran (1867–1932). His father was a wine merchant, and Bjarne ended up in the same line of work.

In 1908, he moved to Chicago where he worked in the offices of a railway company. When he returned to Bergen in 1909, he took an office job for a commercial office. His brother, Trygve Gran Kroepelien (1891–1969), had become a rich businessman.

=== Polynesia ===
As a 27-year old, Kroepelien moved in 1917 to Polynesia, where he lived in Tahiti for two years. Here, he married Tuimata, one of the daughters of chief Teriieroo. When Spanish flu came to Tahiti in 1918, and took the lives of a third of the population, Tuimata also died. Kroepelien's efforts in helping the sick earned him the French Legion of Honour. He returned to Norway in 1919 and moved to Oslo. He left a child behind in Tahiti, and his descendants there included the academic and linguist Jean-Claude Teriierooiterai.

=== Collection ===
Kroepelien never returned to Polynesia. He wanted to live in Norway with the memories of his dead wife, and did not want to witness the changes the West had brought to the islands. He began instead to collect books from and about the South Seas, a collection that would eventually grow to around 5,000 books. This collection was left to the University of Oslo and today is located in the Kon-Tiki Museum.

== Bibliography ==
- Frankrikes vine (1922) - illustrated by Sverre Pettersen
- Kroepelien, Bjarne (1944). Tuimata. illustrated by Guy Krohg. Oslo: Cappelen.
- The Tahitian Imprints of the London Missionary Society, 1810-1834 (1950)
