= Simplicio Lissant =

French Polynesian politician

Mayor of Punaauia
- Incumbent
- Assumed office 7 September 2018
- Preceded by: Rony Tumahai

Member of the French Polynesian Assembly for Windward Isles 3
- Incumbent
- Assumed office 30 April 2023

Personal details
- Born: 1962
- Party: Tāpura Huiraʻatira

Simplicio Lissant (born 1962) is a French Polynesian politician and Member of the Assembly of French Polynesia. He has served as Mayor of Punaauia since 2018. He is a member of Tāpura Huiraʻatira.

He was first elected to the municipal council of Punaauia in 2002. He was elected deputy mayor in 2008, serving under Rony Tumahai. He ran in the 2013 French Polynesian legislative election as a candidate for A Tia Porinetia, but was not elected. In September 2018 he was elected as Mayor of Punaauia following Tumahai's death. He was re-elected unopposed as Mayor following the 2020 municipal elections in May 2020.

He was first elected to the Assembly of French Polynesia as a Tāpura candidate in the 2023 French Polynesian legislative election.
