= Eliane Chungue =

French Polynesian medical researcher

Eliane Chungue (born 16 August 1951) is a French Polynesian medical researcher and former director of the Malardé Institute.

Chunge was born in Papeete. After obtaining a doctorate of science at the University of Montpellier, she worked at the Malardé Institute in Tahiti, studying Ciguatera fish poisoning and dengue fever. From 1996 to 1999 she was director of the institute. She then moved to the Pasteur Institute in Paris, and from 2001 to 2004 she was director of the Pasteur Institute in New Caledonia. From 2005 to 2011 she worked with the Pasteur Institute of Madagascar to create an epidemio-surveillance unit.

In September 2019, she was made a knight of the Order of Tahiti Nui.
