= Tumata Robinson =

Tumata Robinson (born 1954) is a French Polynesian dancer and choreographer. She is the founder of the Tahiti Ora dance troupe, and cofounder of the 'Ori Tahiti Nui dance competition. She was the daughter of American sailor and Legion of Honour recipient William Albert Robinson.

Robinson grew up in Paea, a suburb of Papeete. Kept isolated as a child, dance lessons were her only outing. She founded her first dance troupe, Tumata, at the age of 18. She co-founded the Grands ballets de Tahiti in 1998, and the Tahiti Ora in 2008. Her dance presentation "The legend of Marukoa" won the grand prize at the Heiva competition in 2011, and subsequently toured internationally. In 2012 she co-founded (with Manouche Lehartel) the 'Ori Tahiti Nui international dance competition.

In July 2016 she was made a knight of the Ordre national du Mérite.
