= R. Keao NeSmith =

- Born: Waimea, Kauai County, Hawaii
- Education: University of Hawaiʻi at Hilo (BA); University of Hawaiʻi at Mānoa (MA); University of Waikato (PhD, 2012)
- Known for: Hawaiian language revival, translation of literature into Hawaiian
- Scientific career
- Fields: Hawaiian language, Tahitian language

R. Keao NeSmith is a Native Hawaiian linguist, educator, and translator.

== Early life and education ==
NeSmith was born and raised in Kekaha, Kauaʻi. Although his first language was English, he was surrounded by Hawaiian speakers (including his grandmother), and learned Hawaiian via immersion in childhood. He studied Japanese in high school. He began to study Hawaiian formally while working on his undergraduate degree at the University of Hawai'i at Hilo.

NeSmith holds a PhD in applied linguistics from the University of Waikato, having graduated in 2012.

== Career ==
He has taught at various universities, such as the University of Hawaiʻi at Hilo, l'Université de la Polynésie française in ‘Outumaoro, Tahiti, the University of Waikato in Hamilton, New Zealand, and the University of Hawaiʻi at Mānoa in Honolulu, Hawai‘i. He has taught Hawaiian language, Hawaiian Studies, subjects on endangered language revitalization, and Tahitian language.

His work on "Neo-Hawaiian" as a separate variety of Hawaiian has informed debate in Hawaiian language studies, as well as broader issues in language revitalization.

=== Translation work ===
He has translated a number of books into Hawaiian. He completed his first translation, of Alice's Adventures in Wonderland, in 2012. He has since translated books such as The Hobbit, The Little Prince, and the Harry Potter series. He is currently working on a Hawaiian translation of The Chronicles of Narnia.
