= Florent Atem =

French Polynesian guitarist

Florent Atem (born 24 November 1979) is a French Polynesian guitarist and academic who was the first Tahitian nominated for a Grammy Award. He is the son of educator Felix Atem and brother of academic and musician Carole Atem.

== Biography ==
Atem was educated at Raitama primary school, Taaone college, and Lycée Paul-Gauguin. He grew up in a musical environment - his sister played the piano, and his father the ukulele. At the age of 15 he learned to play the guitar. After a year of lessons, he took an internship at the Guitar Institute of Technology in Hollywood in 1997. While performing in America, he was invited to produce an album by music producer John Cuniberti, known for producing several Joe Satriani albums. He received his first Grammy nomination in 2007.

He later completed a master's degree at the University of French Polynesia, and began teaching at the university in 2007. In 2016 he completed a doctoral thesis on the Lewis and Clark Expedition at Aix-Marseille University. He is currently a lecturer in English and Anglo-Saxon languages and literature at UPF.

== Musical career ==
Atem has been nominated in the Grammy Awards six times, four times with his sister.

Known for Shredder Boy, he is the inventor of the "Slide Picking Technique", developed by him for 15 years.

In 2003, music producer John Cuniberti, said that "Florent is the new Satriani, with a style of his own".

=== Discography ===
==== Solo ====
- 2002 - Songs "Sacred Ground" and "Dream Valley", featured on the compilation "New Wave Natives, On The Edge"
- 2005 - Dreamtown
- 2006 - Song "Sacred Ground", featured on the compilation "Hawaiian Slack Key Kings"
- 2008 - Silver Flame (EP)
- 2008 - Song "Wonder Island", featured on the compilation "Hawaiian Slack Key Kings, Vol. 2"

==== Carole & Florent Atem ====
- 1997 - Southern Cross
- 1998 - Carole & Florent ATEM (Single)
- 1999 - Ha'amana'o (EP)
- 2002 - Favorites
- 2003 - Song "Love And Honesty", present in the collection "Hawaiian Style 3"
- 2004 - Song "Easy Lover", present in the collection "Duets - Island Style"
- 2006 - Song "One Love Medley", present in the collection "Everybody Loves Bob Marley"
