= Michel Charleux =

French archaeologist (1945–2018)

Michel Charleux (6 September 1945 — 14 October 2018) was a French archaeologist who did much of his work in French Polynesia and did important work on Tapa cloth.

Charleux was born in Paris, but spent much of his childhood in Ivory Coast, Senegal, and Niger. After high school at Lycée Louis-le-Grand he studied geology at the Sorbonne, then became a teacher. He then studied archeology at Paris 1 Panthéon-Sorbonne University. In 1973 he moved to French Polynesia, where he surveyed archeological sites and restored marae on Tahiti. He then worked in Vanuatu, studying Lapita culture sites on Malo Island.

He returned to French Polynesia in 1977, where he taught archaeology and managed the excavation of Vai'hi marae on Raiatea. In the 1980's he taught at Lycée Paul-Gauguin and worked the Musée de Tahiti et des Îles, where he developed a "museum-suitcase" to display the contents of the museum on small islands. He later worked at the Musée national des Arts d'Afrique et d'Océanie in Paris. In 1987, with the assistance of the French Navy, he conducted a 32-day archaeological dig on Eiao.

In September 1987 he put his research on hold after he was appointed principal of Telopea Park School in Canberra, Australia. In 2001 he was made a member of the Ordre des Palmes académiques.

After retiring in 2007 he began a doctoral thesis, and conducted a number of further digs on Eiao. In February 2013 he conducted a 100-day dig on the island. In 2017 he edited a book on Tapa cloth, Tapa: From Tree Bark to Cloth: An Ancient Art of Oceania, from Southeast Asia to Eastern Polynesia.

In July 2018 he was made a knight of the Order of Tahiti Nui.
