= John Martin (soldier) =

Tahitian soldier and linguist

- Born: 8 December 1921; Papeete, French Polynesia
- Died: 31 December 2012 (aged 91); Papeete, French Polynesia
- Military career
- Allegiance: Free French
- Branch: Troupes de marine
- Service years: 1940–1946
- Rank: Chief sergeant
- Awards: Legion of Honor Croix de guerre (1939–1945) Médaille militaire Resistance Medal Colonial Medal

John Martin (8 December 1921 – 31 December 2012) was a Tahitian soldier and linguist. After service in the Second World War, he went on to found the Tahitian Academy.

== Biography ==
Martin was born and raised in Tahiti, where he studied at the Vienot school and obtained his elementary certificate. In September 1940, aged 18, he enlisted in the expeditionary force founded by Captain Félix Broche, which would become the Pacific Battalion. Within its ranks, he rose through to the rank of master sergeant. He fought at the Battle of Bir Hakeim, in Tunisia, in Italy, then, from the summer of 1944 and the landing in Provence, he followed the rise of the 1st Free French Division as far as the Vosges.

He married in Paris in 1945 before returning to Tahiti with the other surviving volunteers of the Pacific Battalion, including one of his cousins, Walter Grand, president of the Territorial Assembly of French Polynesia from 1955 to 1958.

After the war, John Martin served from 1946 to 1950 in the Territory's Economic Affairs, before joining Radio Tahiti, where he became director of Tahitian language programs. He was official interpreter during Charles de Gaulle's 1956 and 1966 visits to French Polynesia. After three years spent in Paris as deputy to the head of the delegation of French Polynesia, from 1962 to 1965, he joined the government of the territory as chief of staff.

A fervent defender of the Tahitian language and culture, he was one of the founders, in 1972, of the Tahitian Academy. He translated The Little Prince into Tahitian.

In January 1997 he was appointed a commander of the Order of Tahiti Nui.

== Evolution in rank ==
- 2nd class : 9 September 1940
- Corporal: January 21, 1941
- Master Corporal: July 14, 1941
- Sergeant: October 25, 1941
- Staff Sergeant: October 18, 1944

== Honors ==
- Knight of the Legion of Honor (1972)
- Médaille militaire
- Croix de guerre (1939–1945)
- Resistance Medal
- Commander of the Order of Tahiti Nui (1997)
- Colonial Medal
- Croix de guerre des théâtres d'opérations extérieures
- Commemorative medal for voluntary service in Free France
