= Tuamotuan language =

Polynesian language native to French Polynesia

Pa‘umotu
- Reo Pa’umotu; Reko Pa’umotu
- Native to: French Polynesia
- Region: Tuamotus, Tahiti
- Ethnicity: 15,600 (2007 census?)
- Native speakers: 4,000 in Tuamotu (2007 census) many additional speakers in Tahiti
- Language family: Austronesian: Malayo-Polynesian; Oceanic; Polynesian; Eastern Polynesian; Tahitic; Pa‘umotu

Language codes
- ISO 639-3: pmt
- Glottolog: tuam1242
- ELP: Tuamotuan
- Pa‘umotu is classified as Severely Endangered by the UNESCO Atlas of the World's Languages in Danger.

Tuamotuan, Pa’umotu or Paumotu (Tuamotuan: Reo Pa’umotu or Reko Pa’umotu) is a Polynesian language spoken by 4,000 people in the Tuamotu archipelago, with an additional 2,000 speakers in Tahiti.

The Pa‘umotu people today refer to their islands as Tuamotu while referring to themselves and their language as Pa‘umotu (or Paumotu). Pa‘umotu is one of six Polynesian languages spoken in French Polynesia, the other five languages being Tahitian, Marquesan, Mangarevan, Rapa, and Austral.

The Pa‘umotu alphabet is based on the Latin script.

The language was particularly studied by anthropologist John Francis Stimson (1893–1958), and by linguist Jean-Michel Charpentier (1943–2014).

== About the language ==
=== History and culture ===
Little is known regarding the early history of the Tuamotus. It is believed that they were settled in c. 1150 AD by people from the Society Islands. Europeans first arrived in the islands in 1521, when Ferdinand Magellan reached them while sailing across the Pacific Ocean. Subsequent explorers visited the islands over the centuries, including Thor Heyerdahl, the famous Norwegian ethnographer who sailed the Kon-Tiki expedition across the Pacific in 1947.

The effects of early European visits were marginal as they had no political effects. The language, however, was ultimately affected by the Tahitian language, which was itself affected by European expansion. The eventual arrival of European missionaries in the 19th century also led to loanwords, including the creation of new vocabulary terms for the Pa‘umotu new-found faith, and the translation of the Bible into Pa‘umotu.

The original religion of the Tuamotus involved the worship of a higher being, Kiho-Tumu or Kiho. Religious chants have been preserved and translated that describe the attributes of Kiho and how he created the world.

In more recent times, the Tuamotus were the site of French nuclear testing on the atolls of Moruroa and Fangataufa.

=== Classification ===
Paumotu is a member of the Polynesian group of Oceanic languages, itself a subgroup of the Austronesian family.

Some foreign influence is present.

=== Geographic spread ===
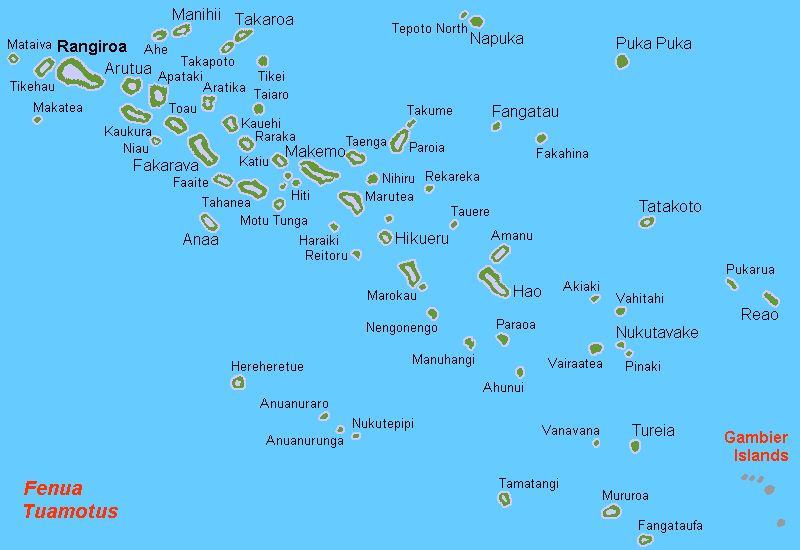
A rough map of the Tuamotu Archipelago

Pa’umotu is spoken among the atolls of the Tuamotu Archipelago, which amount to over 60 small islands. Many of the former inhabitants have moved to Tahiti, causing the language to dwindle.

In the 1970s, there were a number of Pa‘umotu living in Laie, O'ahu, Hawai'i, as well as other locations on the island of O'ahu. Some were reported to live in California and Florida. There were also a number of people living in New Zealand who were reportedly Pa‘umotu, although they came from Tahiti.

=== Dialects ===
Pa‘umotu has seven dialects or linguistic areas: covering Parata, Vahitu, Maraga, Fagatau, Tapuhoe, Napuka and Mihiroa. The native Pa‘umotu people are somewhat nomadic, shifting from one atoll to another and thereby creating a wide variety of dialects. The natives refer to this nomadic tendency as orihaerenoa, from the root words ori (meaning 'to wander around'), haere (meaning 'to go') and noa (meaning 'non-restriction').

Pa‘umotu is very similar to Tahitian, and a considerable amount of Tahitianization has affected Pa‘umotu. Primarily due to the political and economical dominance of Tahiti in the region, many Pa‘umotu (especially those from the Western atolls) are bilingual, speaking both Pa’umotu and Tahitian. Many young Pa‘umotu who live on atolls nearer to Tahiti speak only Tahitian and no Pa‘umotu.

An example is the Pa’umotu use of a velar sound such as k or g, which in Tahitian-Pa‘umotu (a blending of the languages) is rather a glottal stop. For example, the word for 'shark' in Pa’umotu is mago, but in the blending of the two languages it becomes ma'o, dropping the voiced velar nasal consonant g. The same is true with words such as matagi/mata'i and koe/'oe.

These differences in dialect lead to a split between "Old Pa‘umotu" and "New Pa‘umotu". Many younger Pa‘umotu do not recognize some words that their forebears used, such as the word ua for 'rain'. Younger Pa‘umotu use the word toiti for 'rain' in contemporary Pa‘umotu.

=== Vitality ===
According to UNESCO, Pa’umotu is "definitely endangered" Indeed, since before the 1960s, many of the Tuamotu islanders have migrated to Tahiti for education or work opportunities; this rural flight has strongly contributed to the weakening of Pa’umotu, which is sometimes described as a "dying language".

Since the 1950s, the only language used in education in French Polynesia was French. No Tahitian or Pa‘umotu is taught in schools.

The Pa‘umotu language is being monitored by a dedicated regulatory body, called Académie pa'umotu, or Kāruru vānaga. It was created in 2008, following the model of Académie tahitienne.

== Grammar ==
No systematic grammar has been published on the Pa‘umotu language. Current Tahitian-Pa‘umotu orthographies are based upon the Tahitian Bible and the Tahitian translation of the Book of Mormon.

An available source for Pa‘umotu-English comparatives is The cult of Kiho-Tumu, which contains Pa‘umotu religious chants and their English translation.

=== Phonology ===
Consonants
	Labial	Alveolar	Velar	Glottal
Nasal	m	n	ŋ ⟨g⟩	
Plosive	p	t	k	ʔ ⟨ʻ⟩
Fricative	f v			h
Rhotic		r		

The glottal stop is found in a large number of Tahitian loanwords. It is also found in free variation with /k/ and /ŋ/ in a number of words shared between Pa‘umotu and Tahitian. An epenthetic glottal stop may be found at the beginning of monophthong-initial words.

Vowels
	Front	Central	Back
High	i		u
Mid	e		o
Low		a	o

Short vowels contrast with long vowels and vowel length is thereby phonemic. A number of non-identical vowel pairs appear in Pu'amotu, and long vowels are interpreted as pairs of identical vowels and written by doubling the vowels in all cases. In non-stressed position, the distinction between long and short may be lost. The position of stress is predictable. Primary stress is on the penultimate vowel before a juncture, with long vowels counting double and semi-vocalized vowels not counting as vowels. One out of every two or three vowels is stressed.. that is, the minimum domain for assigning stress is two vowels, and the maximum is three. When a long vowel is stressed, the stress falls on the entire vowel, regardless of which mora is penultimate, unless the long vowel is word-final. No more than one unstressed vowel/mora can occur in a row, but, when the first of two vowels is long, there is no stresses mora between them. Morphemes of a single short vowel cannot be stressed.

=== Vocabulary ===
Naturally, a lot of similarity between other Polynesian languages can be seen in the vocabulary of Pa’umotu. 'Woman', for example, is vahine, very close to the Hawaiian and Maori wahine. Another example is 'thing', which in Pa’umotu is mea, and is the same in Samoan and Maori.

Pa’umotu speakers utilize fast deliberate speech, slow deliberate speech, and normal speech patterns. They apply phrase stress, which can be phonemic or morphemic, and primary stress, which is not phonemic.

== Notes and references ==
=== Further reading ===
- Charpentier, Jean-Michel; François, Alexandre (2015). Atlas Linguistique de Polynésie Française — Linguistic Atlas of French Polynesia (in French and English). Mouton de Gruyter & Université de la Polynésie Française. ISBN 978-3-11-026035-9.
- Edward Tregear (1895). A Paumotuan dictionary with Polynesian comparatives. Whitcombe & Tombs Limited (2010 edition: General Books, Wellington, New Zealand (and Nabu Press). p. 118. ISBN 1-245-00811-0.
