= Vairao =

Vaira'o
- Associated commune of Tai'arapu-Ouest
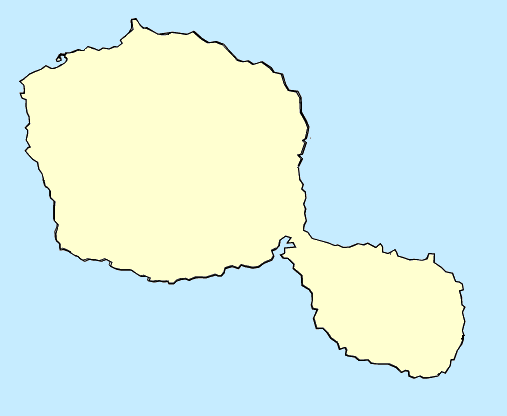
- Location within Tahiti
- Location of Vaira'o
- Coordinates: 17°49′9″S 149°17′32″W
- Country: France
- Overseas collectivity: French Polynesia
- Commune: Tai'arapu-Ouest
- Population (2022): 2,991
- Time zone: UTC−10:00

Vaira'o, also known as Port Vairao and Matiti, is a small port town and district on the southwest coast of Tahiti, located just northwest of Teahupo'o. A town hall and sports centers lie in the northern part of the village. It also features the Iti Diving International Centre, the only diving centre in Tahiti-Iti. Vaira'o Bay and lagoon are known for excellent fishing opportunities.
