= AeroLyon =

1996–2002 airline in France

Aerolyon
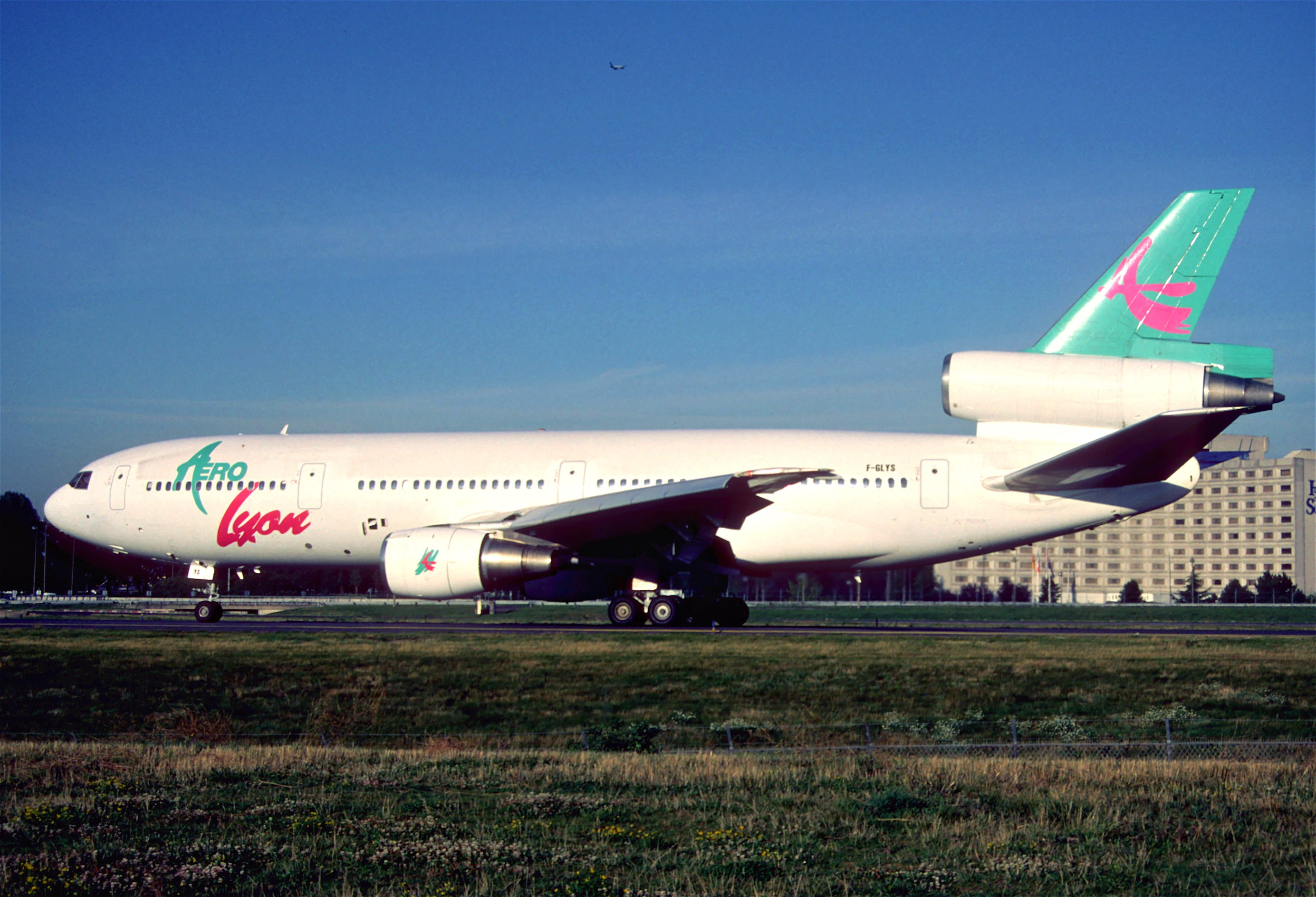
- Douglas DC10-30
IATA	ICAO	Call sign
4Q	AEY	AEROLYON
- Commenced operations: 1996
- Ceased operations: 2002
- Operating bases: Lyon Airport
- Hubs: Lyon Airport
- Secondary hubs: Paris-Charles de Gaulle
- Fleet size: 3
- Destinations: Caribbean, West Indies
- Parent company: Nouvelles Frontieres (1996-2000) TUI AG (2000-2002)

Aerolyon S.A. was a French long-haul airline that was established in October 1996 and started flying that December.

== History ==
Aerolyon was a long-haul airline based in Lyon, France. It flew on a regular basis from various French airports, including Lyon, Paris, Brest, Nantes and Bordeaux to the Caribbean, West Indies and other overseas French territories. It was owned by French tourism company Nouvelles Frontieres, which also owned Corsairfly. Aerolyon also performed services for other air carriers. In 2000, it would theoretically have been taken over by TUI AG when it bought Nouvelles Frontieres. Instead, TUI AG took control of Corsairfly.

In 1996, Aerolyon leased a McDonnell Douglas DC-10-30 from ChallengAir. In 1999, another DC-10 joined the fleet, and a third aircraft in 2002. The airline fleet would never expand beyond three DC-10s. Aerolyon ceased operations in May 2002 and was declared bankrupt in that August.

Aeroplus L'Air, an outfit run by Jean-Marie Gras, attempted to create a revival of the airline using a single Airbus A340. However in December 2002, a court in Lyon decided that a rescue plan was too risky, and it rejected the proposal.

== Fleet ==
Aerolyon operated the following aircraft. Two of the original aircraft were scrapped after Aerolyon's demise, and one of the first aircraft delivered to the company in 1997 was put in storage.

Aircraft	Total
McDonnell Douglas DC10-30	3
Total	3
