= Malardé Institute =

Tahitian research institute

Coordinates: 17°32′40″S 149°34′25″W

The Institut Louis-Malardé (ILM) is a medical research institution in Papeete, Tahiti, focused on public health research and epidemiological monitoring in French Polynesia. It was part of the international network of Pasteur Institutes.

== History ==
The institute was established in 1948 as the Medical Research Institute of Oceania. Initial funding was provided by American sailor William Albert Robinson. The foundation stone for the institute was laid on 24 July 1948, and the institute formally opened on 26 September 1949.

The ILM's research initially focused on Lymphatic filariasis. In its first ten years it reduced the rate of the disease from 8% to 1.2%, and the rate of infestation of the mosquitoes which serve as its vectors from 7.4% to 0.67%. In 1954 it expanded its research into other areas. In 1960 it began work on Tuberculosis. It later worked on Ciguatera fish poisoning leprosy, Zika virus, and Dengue fever.

The ILM is one of the three main players in research in French Polynesia. It hosts a medical entomology laboratory, a laboratory dedicated to toxic micro-algae and a pathological anatomy and cytology laboratory. A P3 (or NSB3) laboratory project was installed in 2016. In 2010 it established the Polynesian Center for Research and Promotion of Island Biodiversity in partnership with the University of French Polynesia, IFREMER, and the Research Institute for Development. In 2019 it was authorised to import sterile mosquito eggs to help in its research.

== Directors ==
- Andréa de Balmann
- Eliane Chungue (1996 - 1999)
- François Laudon (1999 - 2002)
- Patrick Howell (2008 - 2014)
- Pascal Ramounet (2014 - 2017)
- Hervé Varet (March 2017 - present)

== Notable staff ==
- Raymond Bagnis
- Suzanne Chanteau
- Anna-Bella Failloux
