= Marguerite Lai =

French Polynesian dance choreographer

Marguerite Lai is a French Polynesian dancer and choreographer. She is the leader of O Tahiti E, one of French Polynesia's most renowned dance troupes.

Lai is from Rangiroa in the Tuamotus, and is of Chinese-Polynesian descent. She began dancing at the age of 12, after moving to Papeete. In 1986 she founded the O Tahiti E dance troupe, which won the "best professional group" category at the Heiva competition four times, in 1987, 1998, 2005, and 2012. The troupe won again in 2019. In April 2017 she was responsible for a welcoming ceremony for the canoe Hōkūleʻa, which involved 200 dancers.

In 2002 she was made a knight of the Ordre des Arts et des Lettres. In January 2018 she was made a knight of the Ordre national du Mérite.
