= Tahitian Academy =

The Tahitian Academy (Tahitian: Te Fare Vānaʻa, French: Académie tahitienne) is a cultural institution in French Polynesia with the purpose of preserving and promoting the Tahitian language. The Academy standardizes vocabulary, grammar, and spelling; promotes the publication and translation of works in Tahitian; and studies the origins of the language and its relationship with other Pacific languages. Founded in 1972, it consists of up to twenty members elected by their peers.

Its current director is Flora Devatine.

== History ==
=== Establishment ===
The Tahitian Academy was conceived independently by linguist Martial Iorss and broadcaster John Martin, who was responsible for Tahitian programs at Radio-Tahiti. Both recognised the need for a body to standardise Tahitian grammar and vocabulary to enable Tahitian to be used as a modern language. In 1967, following the denial of permission for Territorial Councillor John Teariki to publish a Tahitian-language newspaper, the Territorial Assembly demanded the repeal of the ban on Tahitian-language publications. Following this, the Governing Council approved in principle the creation of an "Academy of the Tahitian language". In 1970 the Maohi Protestant Church established a commission to study the issue. In 1972 the Territorial Assembly voted to establish a commission to appoint the first 20 academics and draft the statutes of the Academy. The commission operated very quickly, but the first session of the Academy did not take place until 1974.

=== The first academy ===
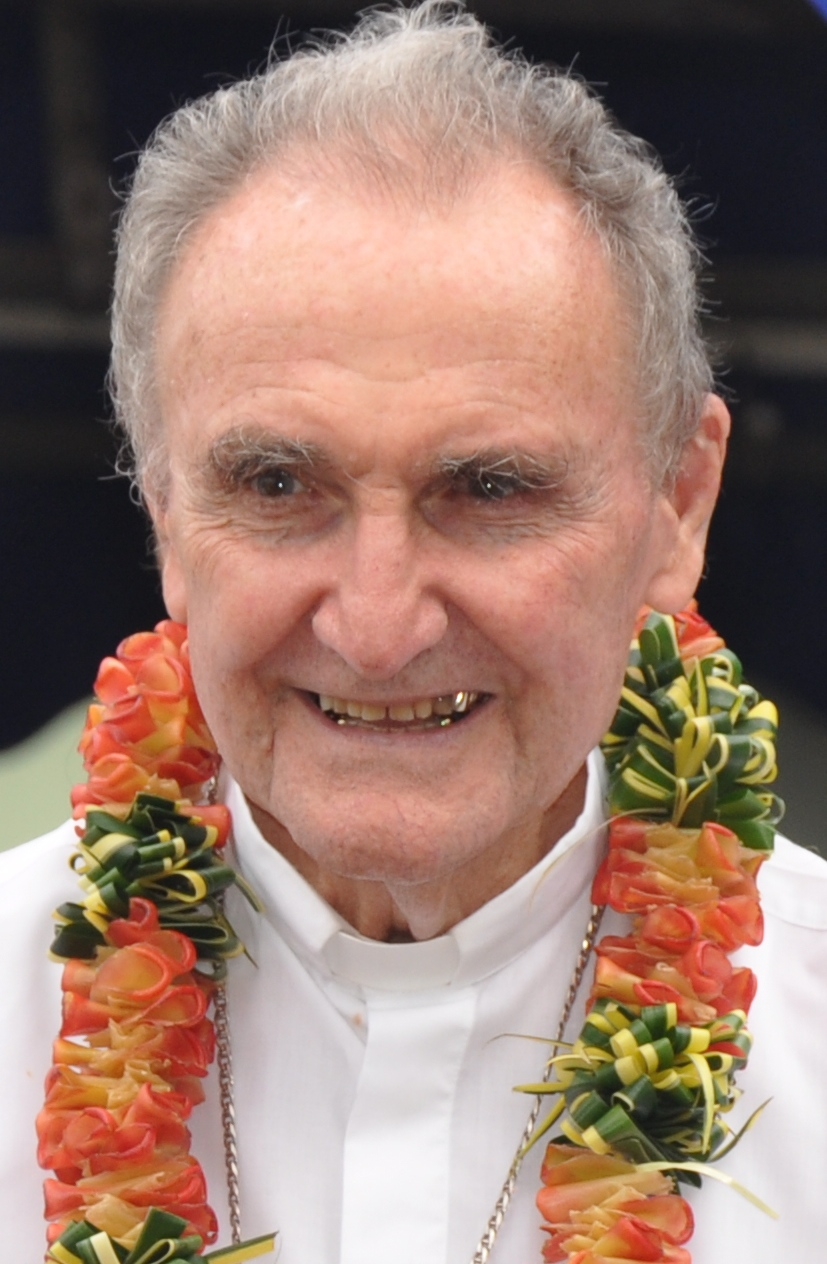
Hubert Coppenrath, one of the first members of the Academy

The first Academy included as members:

- Flora Devantine (b. 1942): Spanish teacher, Tahitian language poet
- Hubert Coppenrath (1930–2022): then parish priest of Papeete Cathedral
- John Doom (b. 1936): general secretary of the Evangelical Church of French Polynesia
- Yves Lemaitre (b. 1936): mathematician and linguist, director of ORSTOM in Papeete
- John Martin (1921–2012)
- Samuel Raapoto (1921–1976): president of the Evangelical Church of French Polynesia
- Nedo Salmon (1925–1994): territorial councilor
- Francis Sanford (1912–1996): Member of Parliament, resigned in 1978
- Maco Tevane (1937–2013): member of the Government Council

The membership of the first academy indicates that the Tahitian language was used by many members of the ruling categories (civil servants, politicians, men of the Church), including native metropolitans (Yves Lemaître, but also Paul Prévost, a linguist based in Papeete after training at INALCO).

The first sessions of the Academy took place at the headquarters of the Evangelical Church. The Academy first chose a Tahitian name: Fare Vana'a takes up that of an institution of ancient society, the place where old men passed on their traditional knowledge to young people. It then drafted articles of association, providing for an office (To'ohitu) of seven members elected for one year (director, chancellor, secretary, treasurer and 3 assessors).

=== Evolution and activities of the Academy ===
The Academy first devoted itself to the development of a Tahitian grammar, published in December 1986, then to a Tahitian-French dictionary, published in 1999. A French-Tahitian dictionary is not yet complete due to the requirement to create numerous Tahitian neologisms. A second volume of the French-Tahitian dictionary was published in June 2015.

The Academy has also produced more modest works: textbooks (one for primary school: Ta'u puta reo Tahiti, one for secondary school: Hei pua ri'i, collection of selected pieces) and a Lexicon of technical vocabulary (a list of neologisms for use by administrations).

In November 2002, after several months of intensive work in coordination with a committee of academicians composed of Bishop Hubert Coppenrath, Patua Coulin (known as “Mama Vaetua”), John Doom, John Martin, Raymond Pietri, Winston Pukoki and Maco Tevane, the digital Tahitian-French dictionary was produced by two passionate young Polynesians (Teiva Saranga and Kaimana Van Bastolaer) and implemented online in the form of a public website in order to disseminate the work of the Academy to as many people as possible. Particular attention was paid to the use of spelling respectful of the work of the institution, in particular at the level of the long vowels called "Tarava". The different pronunciations of words that look identical but have very different meanings was another major challenge. As of June 2012 over 785,000 searches have been performed in this online dictionary.

The Academy celebrated its 50th anniversary in 2022.

== Other language academies and associations in French Polynesia ==
=== Marquesas Islands ===
The Marquesan Academy (South Marquesan: Tuhuna Eo Enata) was established in 2000, with the aim of promoting and enriching the Marquesan language.

=== Tuamotus ===
The Pa'umotu–Karuru vanaga Academy was established in December 2008 to preserve and promote the Tuamotuan languages of the Tuamotu archipelago. It grew out of the Te Reo o te Tuamotu association and has 14 members to represent the seven linguistic areas of the Tuamotus.

=== Gambier Islands ===
Currently, there is only one association: Reo Magareva.

== See also ==
- Académie Française
