= University of French Polynesia =

French university in Tahiti

- Former names: French Pacific University
- Type: Public university
- Established: May 29, 1987
- Budget: 973 730 186 XPF
- President: Eric Conte
- Administrative staff: 72
- Students: 3051 (2012)
- Location: Puna'auia, French Polynesia; 17.5770°S 149.6092°W
- Language: French
- Website: www.upf.pf

The University of French Polynesia (French: Université de la Polynésie française, UPF) is a French university located in Tahiti at Puna'auia, French Polynesia.

== History ==
Created by a decree of May 29, 1987, the university was originally called French Pacific University and was split between two sites, one located in New Caledonia (now University of New Caledonia) and the other in Tahiti. The administrative headquarters of the university was in Papeete. Both centers have become autonomous with the Decree No. 99-445 of 31 May 1999.

The University of French Polynesia is based in Outumaoro, Punaauia, Tahiti. The number of students is growing steadily, with a significant increase of over 60% since 1999, and so has the range of course offerings. As of 2019, the number of students reached 2,898.

The University of French Polynesia is often the talk of local newspapers, especially because of its proactive policy for the employability of its graduates. One can mention, among others, the Employers' Forum, the sponsorship of class valedictorians by private companies, the Public Employment Fair, the innovative teaching methods developed by the academic community.

=== Presidents ===
- Pierre Verin (1997–1999), president of the French Pacific University
- Sylvie André (2001–2005), interim director between 1999 and 2000
- Louise Peltzer (2005–2011)
- Eric Conte (2011–2017)
- Patrick Capolsini (2017–)

== Organization ==
The university is headed by the President, who has authority over all the staff. He/she determines the policy of the institution with the assistance of the Board. As the executive authority, the President prepares and implements the multi-year contract with the French Ministry of Higher Education and concludes agreements and conventions on behalf of the university. The President is the chief officer of revenue and expenditure for the university budget and responsible for maintaining order. He/She is elected for a four-year term by a majority of elected Board members.

Professor Eric Conte was elected President of the University of French Polynesia on June 23, 2011.

Conte is assisted by four vice-presidents :

1. Board of Trustees: Patrick Capolsini, associate professor in computer science;
2. Scientific Council: Alban Gabillon, full professor in computer science;
3. Student Life: Vincent Dropsy, associate professor in economics
4. Student Vice President: Andrew John; he is the spokesman of student representatives in various committees.

The Board (CA) determines the policy of the institution. As such, it adopts the budget after a fiscal policy debate. It approves agreements and conventions signed by the President. In addition, upon the proposal of the President, it fills positions allocated to the university. It reviews and adopts rules and approves the annual report of the president.

== The campus ==
Covering an area of over 12 hectares, including facilities in excess of 15,000 m^{2}, the campus of Outumaoro includes:

- Teaching buildings (classrooms, tutorial rooms, amphitheaters);
- Research laboratories;
- Meeting rooms, video rooms, computer rooms, a language laboratory;
- A library with approximately 45,000 books, 257 journal subscriptions, videos and DVDs (over 800 titles), CD-Rom and an online electronic documentation (databases, texts, periodicals );
- A dorm with 72 rooms housing mostly students from remote islands;
- A student restaurant and cafeteria for lunch meals;
- A sports hall for courses and sports competitions;
- A climbing wall, a unique facility in French Polynesia.

== Teaching and research ==
=== Teaching ===
The University of French Polynesia has a diversified and wide course offering, adapted to the local labor market of French Polynesia. As of 2012, it numbers 3051 students plus 40 PhD candidates.

Education in Law, Economics, Management

- Certificate of legal studies
- Bachelor of Public Administration (L3)
- BA of Law
- BA of Economics and Management
- BA of Tourism and International Resort Management
- Master in the Law of Economic Activities
- MA in Management
- "Ombudsman" degree
- University-specific certificate in Environmental Law
- University certificate in Labor Law in French Polynesia
- Preparation for Civil Service Exams
- Institute of Judicial Studies
- Training in Land Claims in French Polynesia
- Courses for local councilors and municipal officials: "The institutions of French Polynesia", "Financial management of local authorities", "Implementation of the general code of local authorities in French Polynesia", "Public Accounting", "Local government litigations"," Local financial litigations "," Contracts and Procurement "," Control of economic and social activities by public authorities "," Criminal accountability of elected and municipal officials", " Intercommunality "
- University degree "Becoming a team manager"
- University degree of Business Creation and Management
- University degree "Assistant Accountant"
- University certificate "Accounting of private and public companies with SAGE software application"
- University Certificate in "E-business"
- Training in Human Resource Management

Courses in Arts, Languages and Social Sciences

- BA in History and Geography
- BA in Foreign Languages Applied to International Business (English-Spanish)
- BA in Arts and French Literature
- BA in English Studies
- BA in Polynesian Studies
- MA in the Languages, Cultures and Societies in Oceania
- University-specific certificate " English for Business"
- Speaking in Tahitian - Level 1
- Speaking in Tahitian - Level 2
- Speaking in Tahitian - Level 3
- Speaking Spanish
- Training "Introduction to eco-responsibility"

Multidisciplinary training

- Degree for accessing university, Option A (Humanities)
- BA in Oceanic Environments

Science courses

- Health and Pre-Med Studies (1st year)
- BS in Mathematics
- BS in Computer Science
- BS in Physics and Chemistry
- BS in Biology
- Vocational degree (L3) Energy and environmental engineering, specializing in renewable energy and energy management (to open in 2013)
- Vocational degree (L3) Systems and software, specializing in information technology and communication
- MA in Natural Sciences, Environment and Ecology, with environmental specialty (M1 at UPMC Paris VI in 2012, M2 in Tahiti from 2013)
- University degree "Suicide Care and Prevention"
- University degree "Spa Manager"
- University degree "Health and Wellness Practice"
- University degree "Organic farming"
- Preparing for IT and Internet Certificate (2i) Level 1

=== International relations ===
The International Relations office implements the university's policy of international cooperation. It handles internal information, organization and management as well as welcoming. It also deals with external relations with foreign universities and organizations. Under the responsibility of the President of the university, an international officer, Dr. Leopold Mu Si Yan, coordinates international relations actions.

The office's activities

- Educate and assist study-abroad candidates, foreign students from partner universities on exchange programs at UPF for one or two semesters, assist scholars in developing international activities.
- Manage financial aid (aid to international mobility of $47 732 XPF per month in 2011-2012 and Erasmus grants), monitor and foster cooperative relationships with partner universities.
- Organize the stay programs of foreign delegations visiting the campus, welcome foreign students and scholars (on Erasmus teaching assignments).
- Inform the university community on UPF's international relations through the "Letter of Research & International Relations" and inform the public through the provision of documentation resources and participation in events such as Orientation Day or Post-Baccalaureate Employers Forum.

=== Research ===
Every university is a place of learning where students are preparing their future careers. As well, every university is a place for research. So it must ensure proper training. Teachers are also researchers. Faculty members are associate professors and full professors who have each a specialty area. Depending on their specialty, they are part of research teams. The University of French Polynesia has five laboratories:

- Governance and Island Development (GDI),
- Traditional and Contemporary Societies in Oceania (Eastco)
- Geopole of the South Pacific (GEPASUD)
- Algebraic Geometry with applications to the Information Theory (GAATI)
- A Joint Research Unit "Pacific Island Ecosystems" (UMR-EIO), in partnership with IRD, Ifremer and Louis Malardé Institute.

The university employs 95 teachers including:

- 65 faculty members (19 full professors and 46 associate professors),
- an adjunct faculty of 28 secondary school teachers
- 2 temporary teaching and research assistants.

== Notable faculty ==
- Carole Atem - musician and French-language lecturer
- Florent Atem - musician and English-language lecturer
- Flora Devantine (born 1942) - writer
- Jean-Claude Teriierooiterai - linguist
- Jean-Marius Raapoto - linguist and politician
- Bruno Saura - professor of Polynesian culture
- R. Keao NeSmith - Native Hawaiian linguist, educator, and translator
- Louise Peltzer - politician, government minister, linguist; university president

== Notable alumni ==
- Nicole Bouteau (born 1969) - politician
- Ilaïsaane Lauouvéa (born 1970) - politician
- Tearii Alpha (born 1971) - politician
- Mireille Chinain - marine scientist
- Steve Chailloux - politician
- Nicole Sanquer (born 1972) - politician
- Vaimalama Chaves (born 1994) - singer, beauty pageant titleholder, and model who was crowned Miss France 2019.

== See also ==
- List of universities in Polynesia
