= Punaʻauia =

Commune in French Polynesia, France

Punaʻauiʻa
- Commune
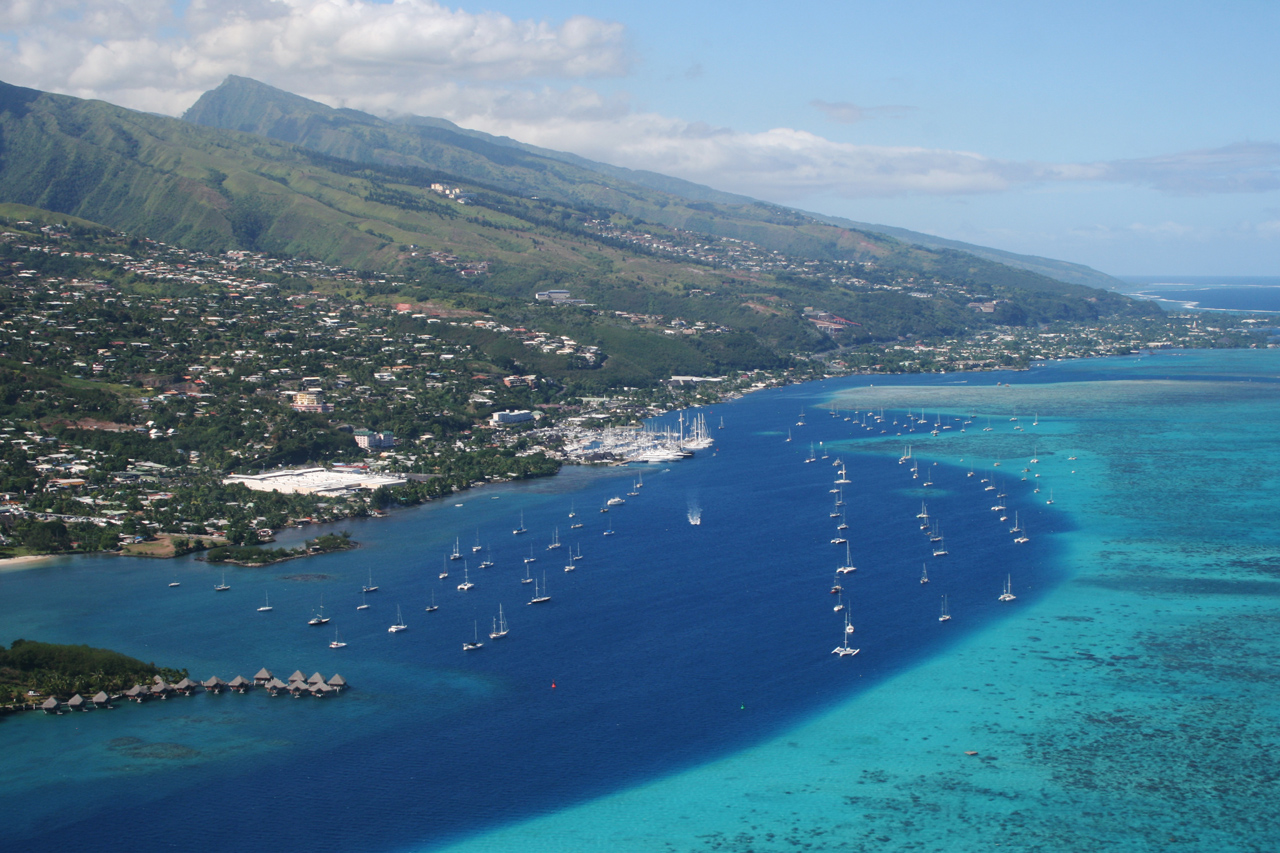
- Punaʻauiʻa, in the southern suburbs of Papeʻete

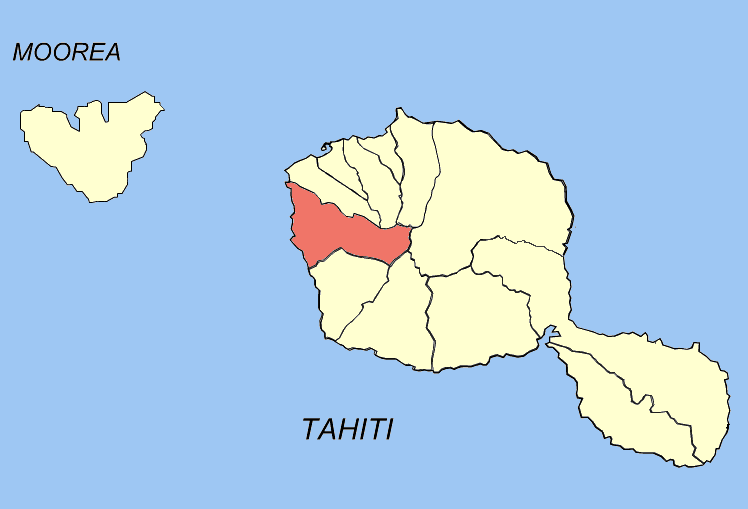
- Location of the commune (in red) within the Windward Islands
- Location of Punaʻauiʻa
- Coordinates: 17°38′S 149°36′W
- Country: France
- Overseas collectivity: French Polynesia
- Subdivision: Windward Islands

Government
  - Mayor (2020–2026): Simplicio Lissant
- Area^{1}: 75.9 km^{2} (29.3 sq mi)
- Highest elevation: 2,241 m (7,352 ft)
- Lowest elevation: 0 m (0 ft)
- Population (2022): 28,781
  - Density: 379/km^{2} (982/sq mi)
- Time zone: UTC−10:00
- INSEE/Postal code: 98738 /98718
- ^{1} French Land Register data, which excludes lakes, ponds, glaciers > 1 km^{2} (0.386 sq mi or 247 acres) and river estuaries.

Punaʻauiʻa is a commune in the suburbs of Papeʻete in French Polynesia, an overseas territory of France in the Pacific Ocean. Punaʻauiʻa is located on the island of Tahiti, in the administrative subdivision of the Windward Islands, themselves part of the Society Islands. In the late 1890s, the French painter Paul Gauguin lived in Punaʻauiʻa. Here he painted his masterpiece Where Do We Come From? What Are We? Where Are We Going?. The commune borders Faʻaʻā on the north and Pāʻea on the south.

== History ==
Like many of the other communes and islands of French Polynesia, the area was first settled by early Polynesians from Asia around 1,000 years ago. These people have already settled on the Marquesas Islands and then they traveled on their sea canoes to the Society Islands. They had lived off of the fish and fruits of Tahiti. Most of the early Polynesians had built houses on the beach. Later on, they had built houses further inland because of high tide.

Captain James Cook came on his expedition to chart the Pacific islands during 1770. He also came with explorer Englishman Samuel Wallis to explore. James Cook later went to Australia. Charles Darwin came to the Society Islands in the 1800s from the western Pacific. Punaʻauiʻa experienced a major population boom in the late 1990s. At the 2022 census it had a population of 28,781, making it the second most populous commune in French Polynesia.

== Geography ==
=== Climate ===
Punaʻauiʻa has a tropical monsoon climate (Köppen climate classification Am). The average annual temperature in Punaʻauiʻa is 26.6 °C (79.9 °F). The average annual rainfall is 1,677.0 mm (66.02 in) with December as the wettest month. The temperatures are highest on average in March, at around 27.7 °C (81.9 °F), and lowest in August, at around 25.1 °C (77.2 °F). The highest temperature ever recorded in Punaʻauiʻa was 35.5 °C (95.9 °F) on 25 March 2016; the coldest temperature ever recorded was 17.0 °C (62.6 °F) on 16 August 1997.

Climate data for Punaʻauiʻa (1991–2020 averages, extremes 1997−present)
Month	Jan	Feb	Mar	Apr	May	Jun	Jul	Aug	Sep	Oct	Nov	Dec	Year
Record high °C (°F)	35.0 (95.0)	35.5 (95.9)	35.5 (95.9)	33.6 (92.5)	33.2 (91.8)	32.5 (90.5)	32.0 (89.6)	32.5 (90.5)	32.5 (90.5)	33.9 (93.0)	34.5 (94.1)	35.2 (95.4)	35.5 (95.9)
Mean daily maximum °C (°F)	31.3 (88.3)	31.4 (88.5)	31.5 (88.7)	31.3 (88.3)	30.3 (86.5)	29.3 (84.7)	28.9 (84.0)	29.0 (84.2)	29.7 (85.5)	30.1 (86.2)	30.8 (87.4)	31.2 (88.2)	30.4 (86.7)
Daily mean °C (°F)	27.5 (81.5)	27.5 (81.5)	27.7 (81.9)	27.5 (81.5)	26.6 (79.9)	25.6 (78.1)	25.2 (77.4)	25.1 (77.2)	25.8 (78.4)	26.2 (79.2)	26.9 (80.4)	27.4 (81.3)	26.6 (79.9)
Mean daily minimum °C (°F)	23.7 (74.7)	23.7 (74.7)	23.8 (74.8)	23.8 (74.8)	22.9 (73.2)	22.0 (71.6)	21.5 (70.7)	21.2 (70.2)	21.8 (71.2)	22.3 (72.1)	23.1 (73.6)	23.6 (74.5)	22.8 (73.0)
Record low °C (°F)	19.7 (67.5)	21.0 (69.8)	20.4 (68.7)	21.0 (69.8)	18.2 (64.8)	17.0 (62.6)	17.1 (62.8)	17.0 (62.6)	17.8 (64.0)	19.0 (66.2)	18.8 (65.8)	20.0 (68.0)	17.0 (62.6)
Average precipitation mm (inches)	262.4 (10.33)	269.1 (10.59)	208.0 (8.19)	133.2 (5.24)	119.2 (4.69)	78.3 (3.08)	48.3 (1.90)	43.3 (1.70)	38.2 (1.50)	71.2 (2.80)	128.4 (5.06)	277.4 (10.92)	1,677 (66.02)
Average precipitation days (≥ 1.0 mm)	15.4	13.6	11.8	8.7	7.0	5.4	4.7	4.4	5.0	7.3	9.9	15.3	108.4
Source: Météo-France

== Transport ==
The Aremiti ferry is the main ferry that sails to Moʻorea and a few other Society Islands. The ferry is white with red stripes. The other is the Moorea Ferry which is white on the top and blue on the bottom.

== Twin towns – sister cities ==
Punaʻauiʻa is twinned with:

- Dumbéa, New Caledonia
