= Louise Peltzer =

Linguist

Louise Peltzer is a French Polynesian politician, former government minister, and linguist.

== Biography ==
Peltzer is originally from Huahine in the Leeward Islands. She holds a PhD in linguistics.

She was the Minister for Culture, Higher Education and Research for French Polynesia for six years. In 2005, Peltzer was elected president of the University of French Polynesia; she was re-elected for a second term in 2009.

In June 2007 she was appointed an Officer of the Order of Tahiti Nui.

In 2011 Peltzer was accused of plagiarism; specifically, she was accused of having published material in 2000 which was taken from a book written by Umberto Eco. She resigned her position at the university in June of the same year.

=== Publications ===
- Peltzer, L., & Conseil international de la langue française. (1985). Légendes tahitiennes. Paris: Conseil international de la langue française.
