= Lycée Michelet (Vanves) =

High school in France

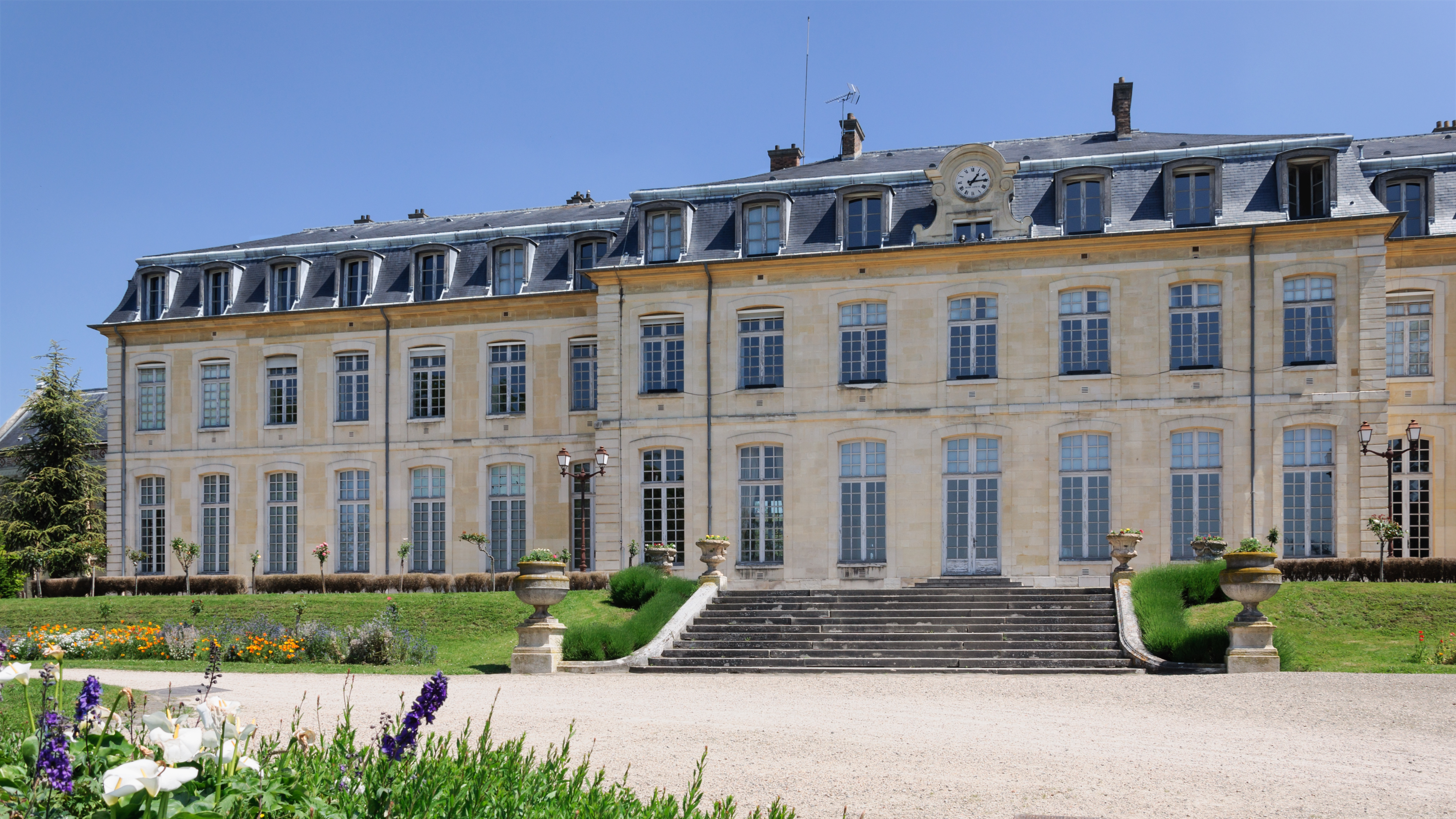
The Pavillon Mansart as seen from the park

Lycée Michelet (Michelet High school), is an establishment located in Vanves (Hauts-de-Seine), bringing together middle school, general education high school and classe préparatoire aux grandes écoles in buildings classified as Monument historique (historical monuments) and surrounded by a park of 17 hectares. It originated from the 1853 establishment of the "Petit collège of Lycée Louis-le-Grand".

== Notable people ==
=== Professors ===
- Jean Poperen (politician, deputy),
- Maurice Druon (writer, author of The Accursed Kings, academician, former Minister of Cultural Affairs),
- Pierre Chaunu (history and geography) from 1951 to 1956,
- Émile Schuffenecker (drawing)
- Jean-Paul Coche (olympic athlete)

=== Students ===
- Jean Aujame (artist),
- Francis Blanche (actor and comedian),
- Pierre Bonnard (artist),
- Jean Borotra (Davis Cup winner),
- Francis Bouygues (founder of Bouygues),
- Albin Chalandon (former French minister of housing),
- Jean-Claude Chermann (scientist, co-discover of HIV virus),
- Jean Dausset (biologist, Nobel Prize winner),
- Jean-Paul Delahaye (computer scientist and mathematician),
- Robert Delaunay, 1885–1941, (artist),
- Paul Deschanel (Former president of France),
- Alexandre Millerand (lawyer and former president of France),
- Dieudonné M'bala M'bala (comedian),
- Maurice Donnay (French playwright),
- Maurice Druon (French writer and academician),
- Jean Glavany (former minister of agriculture, deputy for the Hautes Pyrénées),
- Fernand Gregh (poet).
- Hector Guimard (architect),
- Victor Hugo (writer)
- René Huyghe (professor at the Collège de France and member of the French Academy),
- Jacques Maillot (businessman) (entrepreneur, founder of the Nouvelles Frontières company),
- Jean-Michel Jarre (musician),
- Serge Lama (singer),
- Robert Merle (writer, Prix Goncourt 1949),
- Georges Méliès (inventor of the first special effects in the cinema),
- Serge Moati (journalist, writer, television host, actor, director, screenwriter, producer),
- Hervé Novelli (French politician),
- Gaston Palewski (former Minister of Scientific Research and President of the Constitutional Council (France)),
- Jean-François Parot (diplomat and writer),
- Michel Pastoureau (medieval historian),
- Émile Picard (French mathematician and academician),
- Maurice Ronet (actor, writer and director),
- Mohammad Zaher Shah (last king of Afghanistan)
- Eugene H. Trinh (physicist and NASA astronaut),
- André Truong Trong Thi (creator of the first microcomputer in the world (1973), inventor of the first electronic archiving system),
- Maxime Weygand (general and academician),
- Jean-Pierre Melville (director and screenwriter)
