= Maohi Protestant Church =

Māòhi Protestant Church - Ètārētia Porotetani Māòhi
- Classification: Protestant
- Theology: Reformed, Māòhi theology
- Polity: Congregational
- Associations: WCRC, WCC, CCC
- Region: South Pacific Ocean, in Oceania
- Language: Polynesian languages, French, English
- Headquarters: Pāôfaì, Tahiti
- Territory: Māòhi Nui – French Polynesia
- Founder: London Missionary Society
- Origin: 1815; Māòhi Nui – French Polynesia
- Independence: 2004
- Branched from: London Missionary Society
- Separations: London Missionary Society (LMS, 1797–1860); Paris Evangelical Missionary Society-Société des Missions Évangéliques de Paris (SMEP, 1863–1963)
- Congregations: 100
- Members: 130,000
- Ministers: 77
- Primary schools: École élémentaire Charles Viénot (Papeete); École primaire protestante de Taunoa (Papeete); École primaire du Groupe scolaire d'Uturoa (Uturoa)
- Secondary schools: Lycée professionnel Tuteao a Vaiho (Uturoa); Lycée Samuel Raapoto (Protestant education, Arue); Lycée-collège Pōmare IV (Papeete); Lycée agricole de Taravao (Taravao)

The Maohi Protestant Church (Tahitian: Ètārētia Porotetani Māòhi; French: L’Église Protestante Māòhi) is a Reformed church in French Polynesia.

It is a member of the World Communion of Reformed Churches.

The first missionaries arrived in 1797. After 1815 the majority of the population identified themselves with Christianity, and formed this national Protestant church which spread from Tahiti to the four archipelagos. The official founding date of the church is 1815.

Following developments in 1863 the London Missionary Society handed its control over the church to the Paris Evangelical Missionary Society.

In 1962 the church become autonomous under the name of Eglise évangélique de Polynésie francaise. Except for the Marquesas Islands and Îles Tuamotu-Gambier, the Maóhi Protestant Church is the leading, predominant church in French Polynesia. It has parishes and thousands of members in New Caledonia. The church has 130,000 members and 96 congregations and 81 house fellowships. It has districts and a General assembly.
