= Mara V =

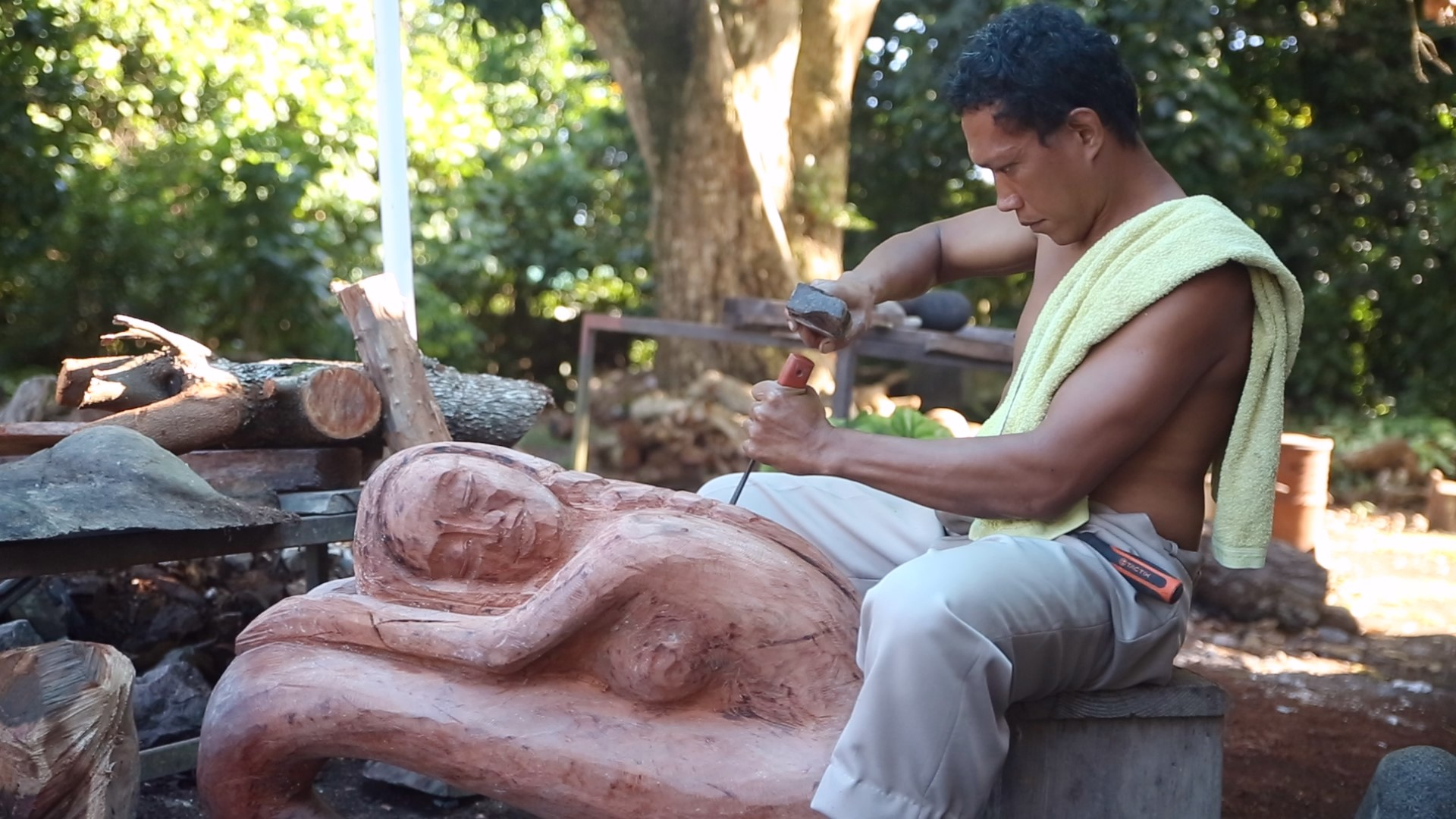
- Romus Nanaia as Vaiere Mara
- Directed by: Jonathan Bougard
- Written by: Jonathan Bougard Jean-Luc Coudray Jean Duday
- Starring: Romus Nanaia Andreas Dettloff
- Music by: Michel Mara
- Production company: In Vivo Prod
- Release date: 11 December 2019
- Running time: 81 minutes
- Country: French Polynesia
- Language: French
- Budget: 260 000 $

Mara V, is a French feature-length documentary dedicated to the Polynesian sculptor Vaiere Mara. Directed by Jonathan Bougard, it was released in 2019 in French Polynesia.

== Synopsis ==
The film is an investigation into the works and history of the first modern Polynesian sculptor, Vaieretiai Mara, who signed his sculptures Mara V. A very prolific and recognized artist during his lifetime, fifteen years after his death he was almost forgotten, his works being for the most part preserved in private collections and not having been the subject of any catalog or posthumous exhibition, he remained known only through a book devoted to him by Patrick O'Reilly in 1979.

The film features a number of re-enactments in which actor Romus Nanaia plays Vaiere Mara. For the scenes where he is at work and sculpts wood, coral or stone, the hands of Gilles Mateha Mara, son of the artist and also a sculptor, are filmed. The main protagonists are the sculptor's widow and children. Their combined testimonies make it possible to reconstruct the biography of the artist. The film is broken down into a five-minute introduction followed by fourteen chapters that can operate independently of each other.

=== Introduction ===
The sculptor is looking for material on a deserted white sand beach, on the edge of a Polynesian reef. He collects blocks of coral washed up on the shore, a large root which he cleans in sea water as well as driftwood, with which he fills copra bags before loading them on the back of a horse. He returns to his workshop and immediately begins to sculpt the root. As he works, a symbolist underwater sequence features a young woman swimming underwater to a sculpture of a vahine kneeling among the coral potatoes.

=== Chapter 1: traces are never lost ===
The first chapter takes place in Brittany. In Paimpont in the Brocéliande forest, Sylvie Gaubert Gruel tells how her military father ordered a large wooden bas-relief from Mara in the early 1980s. She inherited this sculpture which is in her living room. She reads a few passages of correspondence in which her father tells her about his relationship with the sculptor. While searching his archives, she also found some slides showing him at his home in Arue.

In Quimper, ceramist Reiamata Gouzien then presents her collection of Mara sculptures. Originally from Rurutu like him, she evokes the man she barely knew and his island.

=== Chapter 2: The Last Son ===
In Phoenix in the United States, Arauna Mara is the last son of the sculptor. Renowned Polynesian tattooist, he opens the doors of his studio and shares his memories of his father.

=== Chapter 3: Tahiti, the workshop ===
In Tahiti, it is Michel Mara, the sculptor's eldest son, who opens the doors of his house located in Erima on the heights of Arue. This is the place that we saw on Sylvie Gaubert Gruel's slides in the first chapter. The eldest son introduces the place. Mara was a tenant of this house from 1982. Her son then bought the house.

=== Chapter 4: Moorea, the next generation ===
On the island of Moorea we meet Gilles Mateha Mara, his sister Jeanne and their mother Madeleine.

=== Chapter 5: Rurutu, the origins ===
On the sculptor's native island, Rurutu, located in the Austral archipelago. Antonio Lacour remembers the sculptor he saw working and of whom he keeps a work in wood.

=== Chapter 6: Prison ===
In this chapter, the sculptor's family recounts his difficult childhood, beaten by a stepmother who did not want him after the death of his mother when he was two years old. The testimonies of his big sister as well as his niece Naumi Pito provide genealogical details. Naumi Pito keeps two family films in which we see the sculptor. The only video archives known from Mara to date. The figure of Metuaaro Mara, grandfather of Vaiere, builder of schooners in Rurutu, is mentioned. Naumi Pito keeps photos of it.

=== Chapter 7: Mary Magdalene ===
This chapter focuses on the memories of Marie-Madeleine Mara, the sculptor's widow. Born in Arue on February 4, 1939, she married Vaieretiai Mara on March 31, 1963. She explains that he was making tikis then. He had learned with Joseph Kimitete before working for René Pailloux in Papeete. He stopped carving tikis suddenly when he was baptized a Jehovah's Witness in 1964. According to his widow, he was then inspired to create something else.

=== Chapter 8: the art of reading ===
His granddaughter Méryl Mara says that her grandfather was a great reader. His son Michel confirms that he was demanding about education. His daughter Jeanne remembers his library. Always working to feed his family. A family that was content with little, living from day to day.

=== Chapter 9: The Big Woods ===
Manouche Lehartel presents the sculpture that she had bought from the sculptor with whom she had just exchanged a few words in Raiatea. Then it was the turn of Miriama Bono, director of the Museum of Tahiti and The Islands, to express her appreciation of Mara's work, and the interest for Polynesia in making it a major exhibition. Chief Miko recounts her memories of the sculptor. The collector Guilhem Roques opens his doors to us and presents a very large bas-relief commissioned by his father.

=== Chapter 10: Raiatea Tahaa ===
At the end of the 1960s, the young Mara couple moved to Raiatea, in the commune of Avera, near the Taputapuatea marae. At the very heart of mythology and the ancient Polynesian religion. Vaiere Mara became friends with Charles Brotherson and rented him premises in which he opened a gallery. He decorates the Bali Ai hotel. At the end of the 1970s Mara retired to the island of Tahaa, the vanilla island, in the remote commune of Tapuamu. This is where he began working on coral, after a hurricane which brought blocks out of the lagoon.

=== Chapter 11: the Marist Father ===
Reconstruction of the only meeting between Mara and Patrick O'Reilly, recounted in the legendary woodwork by Tahitian sculptor Mara. The Marist father is played by the artist Andréas Dettloff. Marie Madeleine and Jeanne Mara then provide some details and present the sculptor's copy that they keep, corrected by his hand.

=== Chapter 12: The Black Pearl ===
The jeweler Michel Fouchard remembers the time when Mara made busts and displays in white coral to highlight the black pearl necklaces of all the jewelry stores in Polynesia: he managed to polish the coral, to make it smooth. Coral is porous like everything... The emperor of the black pearl Didier Sibani then opens the doors of his vast property, with a very colorful garden, in which we find coral sculptures.

=== Chapter 13: Strength ===
Michel Mara remembers his father's extraordinary physical strength, capable of carrying a tree trunk alone. In which he created the legend of Hina, one of his best-known works.

=== Chapter 14: The End ===
Account of the last days of the sculptor by his loved ones, illustrated with archives. Excerpts from an interview with Miguel Hunt and some images of the meeting between Michel Mara and Jean Guiart, who had just published the sculptor's inventory. The film ends with a sequence where Mateha Gilles Mara models a bust of her father in clay.

== About the film ==
Multibroadcast on the TNTV channel, the film was also screened at the Musée du quai Branly at the beginning of 2020 in the presence of the director, as part of an Oceanists cinema cycle.

== Cast ==
- Marie Madeleine Mara : herself
- Michel Mara : himself
- Gilles Mateha Mara : himself
- Jeanne Mara : herself
- Arauna Mara : himself
- Ouauaaravaitaa Mara : herself
- Méryl Mara : herself
- Naumi Pito :herself
- Romus Nanaia : Vaiere Mara
- Andreas Dettloff : Patrick O'Reilly
- Sylvie Gaubert Gruel : herself
- Didier Sibani : himself
- Michel Fouchard : himself
- Manouche Lehartel : herself
- Minriama Bono : herself
- Chief Miko : himself
- Gilhem Roques : himself
- Reiamata Gouzien : herself
- Antonio Lacour : himself
- Miguel Hunt : himself
- Jean Guiart : himself
