= Teva Victor =

French sculptor (born 1971)

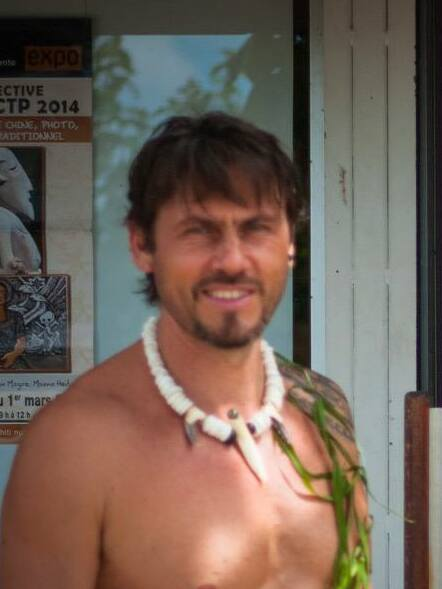
Victor in 2014

Teva Victor (born 30 September 1971 in Bora Bora) is a French sculptor living in Punaauia, on the island of Tahiti in French Polynesia.

== Early life and education ==
Teva grew up on a small islet called Motu Tane not far from the main island of Bora Bora. He is the son of famous French explorer Paul-Emile Victor. He attended high school in Hawaii and college in San Francisco.

Introduced to art through his father's drawings, it was at the age of 18 that a family friend, working on the motu, introduced him to wood carving. He is self-taught and liked to work on living or rooted trees. But from 2001, he preferred to devote himself to volcanic stone, which he describes as "timeless and immutable".

== Career ==
Teva began a career as a presenter and producer of television shows. In 1998 he presented the program Teva, documentaries on peoples and civilizations living in harmony with nature such as the Dogons, the Waoranis and the Toradja, for la Cinquième. However, he returned to sculptures. His sculptures are often two-sided faces. They are both ancient Marquesan tiki, figurative busts of Vaiere Mara, and sometimes have an African influence.

In 2012 he began exhibiting his stone sculptures at the Maison de la culture in Papeete. In February 2014 he joined the Center de Création Contemporaine Teroronui Papeete (CCCTP) for a collective exhibition alongside Chief Miko, Jonathan Bougard and photographer Massimo Colombini. The CCCTP was a transdisciplinary collective. The same year Teva sold a work to Joel Silver and a sculpture to Arnon Milchan. In 2015, he sold several works to Guy Laliberté.

In September 2015 he joined twenty Polynesian artists at the University of French Polynesia for a collective exhibition supporting contemporary creation and artists. His works were exhibited alongside those of Chief Miko and Andreas Dettloff.

At the end of 2015 he worked in situ with free access on a massive stone sculpture in the Maison de la culture. The sculpture was installed in front of the Grand theater of the Maison de la culture. In 2017 he made an 800 kilo stone representation of Queen Pomare IV which was installed in the Queen’s gardens in Papeete. He has stated that his life philosophy is "nothing can match the beauty of nature. We are only there to bring a nod to our passage."

In October 2021 he completed a head with immense eyes and a luscious mouth, a commission intended for the decor of a British mansion. It is a large work, approximately 1.50 m. Its weight is between 1.2 and 1.5 tonnes.

== Works ==
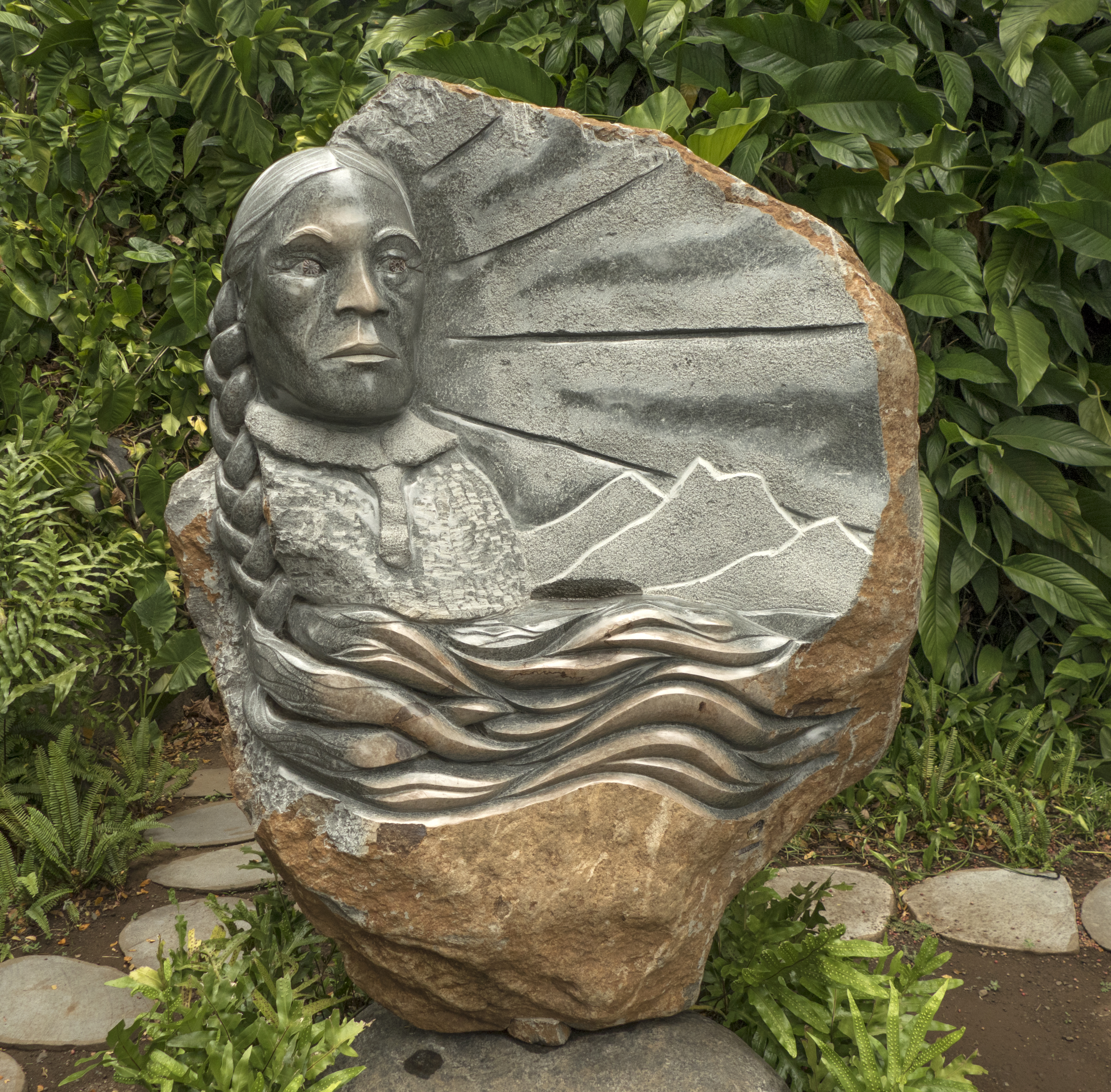
Sculpture honouring Queen Pomare IV

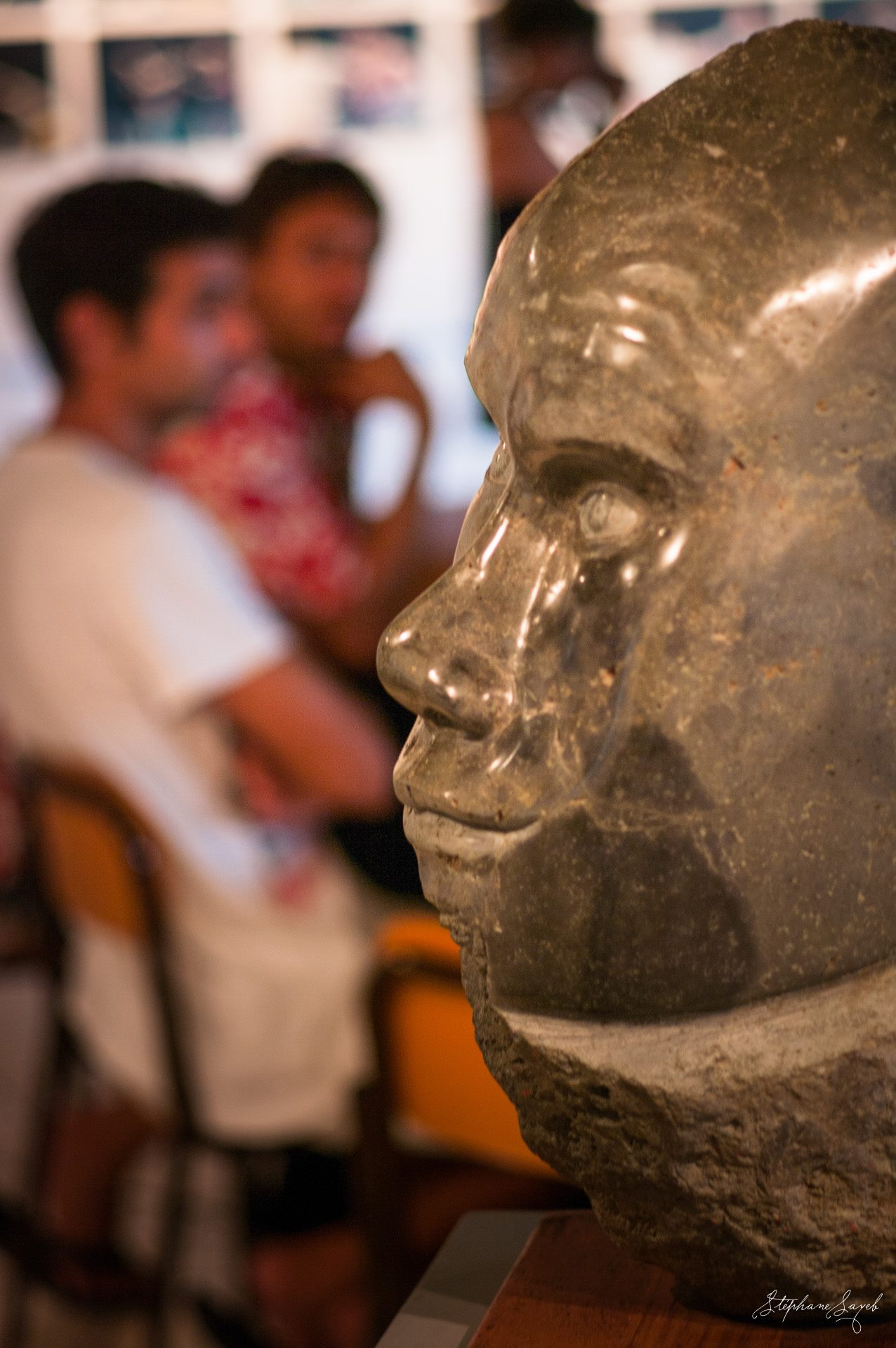
Teva Victor sculpture
