= Jonathan Bougard =

Polynesian cartoonist and director

- Born: Saint-Malo, France
- Occupations: Designer; Documentary film director
- Years active: 2005–present
- Known for: Documentary films on French Polynesian figures

Jonathan Bougard is a French designer and documentary film director active in French Polynesia since 2005.

== Biography ==
Bougard was born in Saint-Malo. An active artist since 2005, he made himself known in Tahiti by offering a thirty-meter-long fresco at the Museum of Tahiti and the Islands in 2008, on the theme of Mana. In 2010, he exhibited in Saint-Louis, Senegal. From 2012 and until 2015, he was a columnist for La Dépêche de Tahiti. In 2014, he chaired the Teroronui Contemporary Creation Center in Papeete, an artist collective with Chief Miko and Teva Victor. He subsequently organized the first retrospective of the sculptor Vaiere Mara.

Since 2015, he has devoted himself mainly to writing, directing and producing a large number of documentary films on significant French Polynesians. First the In Vivo collection, five intimate and lunar portraits co-directed with Jean-Philippe Joaquim and broadcast on the TNTV channel. The first was dedicated to the singer Barthélémy, a second to sculptor Chief Miko, a third to a young tattoo artist, Patu, another to Loulou, trainer of Va'a, the Polynesian canoe, and a last to Sanson, a young Tahitian painter and joker.

In 2017, he created his own production house, In Vivo Prod, which allows him to freely choose his subjects: Semetua, the spirit of the mamaias, dedicated to the speaker Sem Manutahi, choreographer Coco Hotahota whom he will follow in the United States for the film Coco Hotahota Temaeva, the poet John Mairai and the troupe of Faa'a Nuna'a e Hau for Heiva the wrath of the gods. In 2018, he produced the Tatau trilogy dedicated to Pacific tattoos.

In 2019, Jonathan Bougard completed Mara V, an eighty-three minute documentary in search of the works of the sculptor Vaiere Mara, based on reconstructions and testimonies, which required five years of research between Polynesia, the United States and France.

From 2021. he begins to film figures from the Polynesian community active in France, such as the dancer Leia Diard, but also in the United States. In 2021, he dedicated a short film to the Spanish playwright Fernando Arrabal, and to the explosion of the panic movement. Then he became interested in the school of the Congolese sculptor Muta Mayola and set out to find his works which were reputed to have disappeared. He dedicated several short films to it which led him to collaborate with the Congolese painter Gastineau Massamba, while increasing the number of trailers for future films.
