= List of programs broadcast by Tahiti Nui Television =

The following is a list of programs broadcast by the French Polynesian channel Tahiti Nui Television. Its slogan is "La télé de chez nous".

== Current emissions ==
- 50' inside l'actu
- 50' inside le mag
- Automoto
- Ça vous regarde
- Chine actuelle
- D&CO
- E=M6
- Enquête exclusive
- État de santé
- Grands Reportages
- Harry Roselmack en immersion
- Journal de 20 heures de TF1
- L'empire des saveurs
- Le Juste Prix
- Les Reines du shopping
- Ma Chine à moi
- Maison à vendre
- Noël avec Disney
- Recherche appartement ou maison
- Reportages
- Téléfoot
- The Voice, la plus belle voix
- Tous ensemble
- Vendredi, tout est permis avec Arthur
- Zone interdite

== Current series ==
- 24 heures chrono
- Ahitea
- Blue Bloods
- Bones
- Camping Paradis
- Fairy Tail
- Graceland
- Hunter × Hunter (2011 version)
- Joséphine, ange gardien
- La Calle de las novias
- Le Jour où tout a basculé
- Le printemps de Xiaoju
- Le règne de Kangxi
- Le règne de Yongzheng
- Les Feux de l'amour
- Lucifer
- Naruto: Shippuden
- Pavitra Rishta
- Peplum
- Revenge
- Rosario
- Violetta

== Current films ==
- Battleship
- Les gardiens de la galaxie
- Le monde de Narnia chapitre III
- Les Pingouins de Madagascar
- Les Rois de la glisse
- Nouveau départ
- Star Wars Episode VII

== Former programming ==
- Les 12 Coups de Midi
- Absolution - Heritage
- Capital Magazine
- Chapi Chapo
- Ciné Nui
- Dragon Ball Z
- The Empire of Flavors
- Eye for an Eye
- Faati'a Mai
- Fenua Foot
- The Fires of Love
- The Flash
- Football
- Great Return to Life
- Heiiva i Tahiti
- Hiro's
- Horace and Tina
- How to Get Away with Murder
- La impostora
- Islands Festival
- It Looks At You
- Kids TNTV
- Kirby: Right Back at Ya!
- LCI Log
- Live Midi
- Lotto Draw
- Love Hina
- Maison Ikkoku
- Mana Culture
- Manihini
- Mutant X
- My China to Me
- The New Adventures of Lucky Luke
- Nobody's Boy: Remi
- Le Journal
- One Child in the Arms
- Opium and Guerilla: Welcome to Burma
- Parenthood
- Party of Five
- Pirate Family
- Pokémon
- Portée disparue
- Queens of Shopping
- Rediffusion Newspapers
- Research for the Benefit of Families
- RoboCop
- Star Academy
- Story of a Work of Art
- Taamotu
- Ta'ata Tumu
- Teenage Mutant Ninja Turtles
- Te ve'a
- 'Telefilms
- TNTV Sports
- Together
- To'u Fenua To'u Ora
- Tupuna
- Vaa Toa
- Victoire Bonnot
- Les Villaines
- The Weekly Islands
- Yu-Gi-Oh! Duel Monsters
