= Heiva, the Wrath of the Gods =

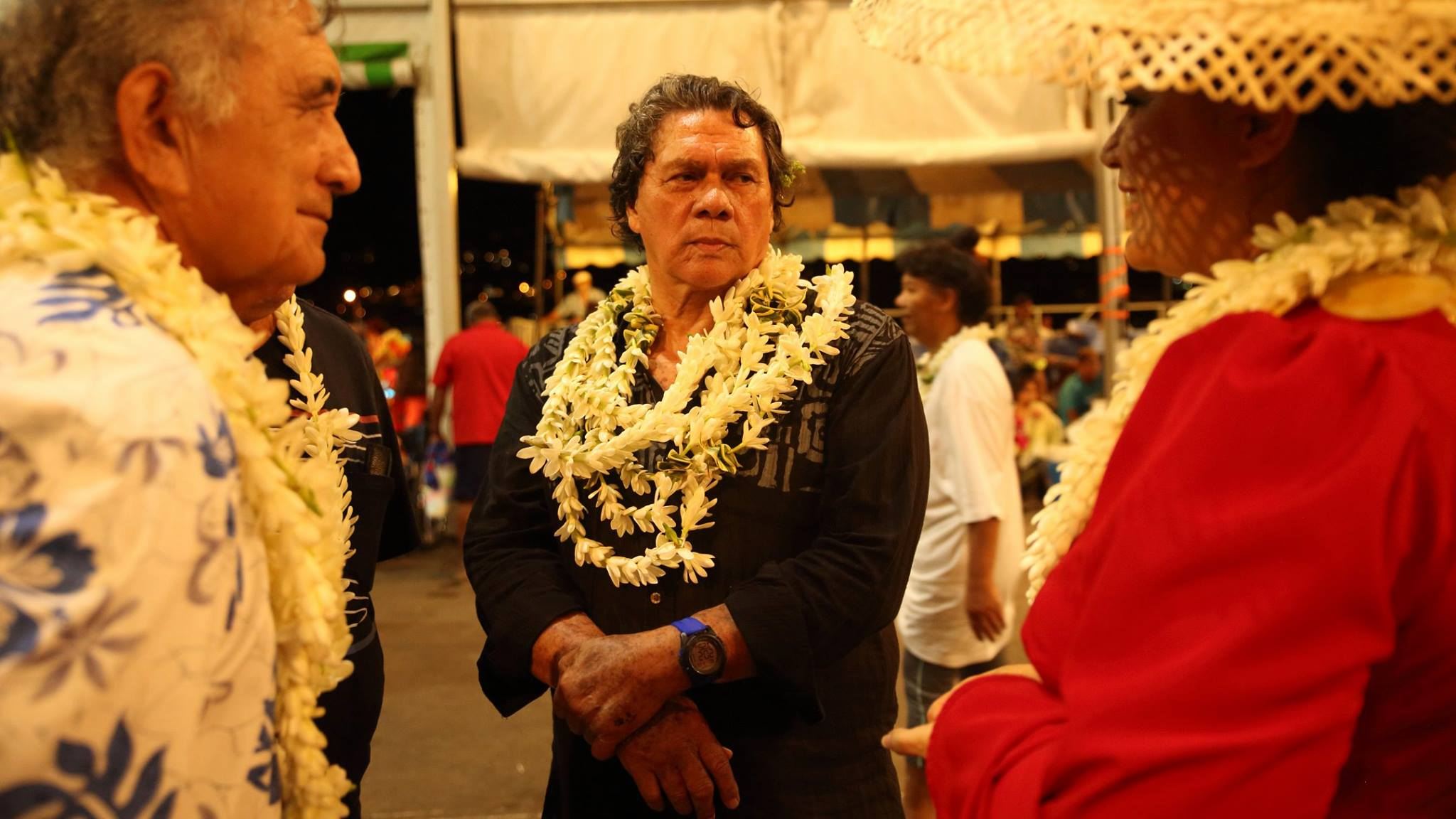
- John Mairai with Oscar Temaru in the film Heiva the Wrath of the Gods
- Heiva la colère des dieux
- Directed by: Jonathan Bougard
- Starring: John Mairai; Oscar Temaru
- Production company: In Vivo Prod
- Release date: 2019
- Running time: 63 minutes
- Country: French Polynesia
- Languages: French; Tahitian

Heiva, the Wrath of the Gods (French: Heiva, la colère des dieux is a French documentary film written and directed by Jonathan Bougard, released in 2019.

== Synopsis ==
Under the leadership of the mayor of the town of Faa'a Oscar Temaru, the communal troupe Nuna'a e hau will perform on July 15 at Heiva i Tahiti 2017. The name of the troupe comes from the political party that Oscar founded with the poet Henri Hiro in the early 1980s, in the midst of a Maori identity revival, before founding the Tavini Huiraatiraa independence party. Another important personality in this return to traditions and culture, the poet John Mairai accepted the role of troop leader. He was inspired by a legend recorded in the book Tahiti in Ancient Times to write a metaphorical libretto on the theme of revolt. Nuna’a e Hau will tell the story of Terehe, a young girl who does as she pleases when the gods imposed a rahui on her island of Raiatea. To punish her for going swimming when even the wind was forbidden to blow, the gods will send her an eel. Terehe knows she is going to die but does not let it happen. At this moment we leave the legend and return to 2017 for the last part in full costume.

Oscar Temaru wanted to unite the groups in his commune, bring together the youth of Faa'a in a super troop. Hirohiti Temataotoa, the leader of the Hanatika troupe, accepted the role of head choreographer, assisted by Manutahi Tetuairia, also winner of the Heiva. Teme Paraurahi, the conductor of the defunct Heikura Nui troupe, leads an ensemble of thirty distinguished musicians.

== Cast ==
- John Mairai : Himself
- Calicia Taufa : Herself
- Sem Manutahi : Himself
- Oscar Temaru : Himself
- Hirohiti Tematahotoa : Himself
- Heia Parau : Herself
