= Bougard =

Bougard is a surname. Notable people with the surname include:

- Erica Bougard (born 1993), American heptathlete
- Jonathan Bougard (fl. from 2005), French designer and documentary film director
