= Guiart =

Guiart is a French surname. Notable people with the surname include:

- Guillaume Guiart (died c.1316), French chronicler and poet
- Jean Guiart (1924–2019), French anthropologist and ethnologist
