= Paul-Émile Victor =

French ethnologist and explorer (1907–1995)

- Born: Paul Eugène Victor; 28 June 1907; Geneva, Switzerland
- Died: 7 March 1995 (aged 87); Bora-Bora, French Polynesia
- Education: École Centrale de Lyon
- Occupations: ethnologist and explorer
- Spouse: Éliane Victor
- Children: Jean-Christophe Victor, Teva Victor

Paul-Émile Victor (born Paul Eugène Victor; 28 June 1907 – 7 March 1995) was a French ethnologist and explorer.

Victor was born in Geneva, Switzerland to French Jewish parents of Bohemian and Polish descent. He graduated from École Centrale de Lyon in 1928. In 1931, he learned how to fly with his instructor and friend, Claude de Cambronne. In 1936, he led an expedition traversing Greenland by dog-sled. Victor, Robert Gessain, Michel Perez, and Eigil Knuth completed the 825 km from Christianshåb in the west to Angmagssalik in the east in 44 days. During World War II, he engaged himself in the US Air Forces. After the War, he initiated the Expéditions polaires françaises to organize French polar expeditions. He died in 1995 on Bora Bora, to which he had retired in 1977.

A survey led by Victor in 1951 concluded that, under the ice sheet, Greenland is composed of three large islands. In 1952 he was awarded the Patron's Medal by the Royal Geographical Society of London for the work.

Mount Victor, in the Belgica Mountains of Antarctica, is named for him.

His son, Jean-Christophe Victor, presented the weekly geopolitical show Le dessous des cartes on Arte until his death in December 2016. Another son, Teva Victor, is a sculptor.
