= Vaiere Mara =

French polynesian sculptor

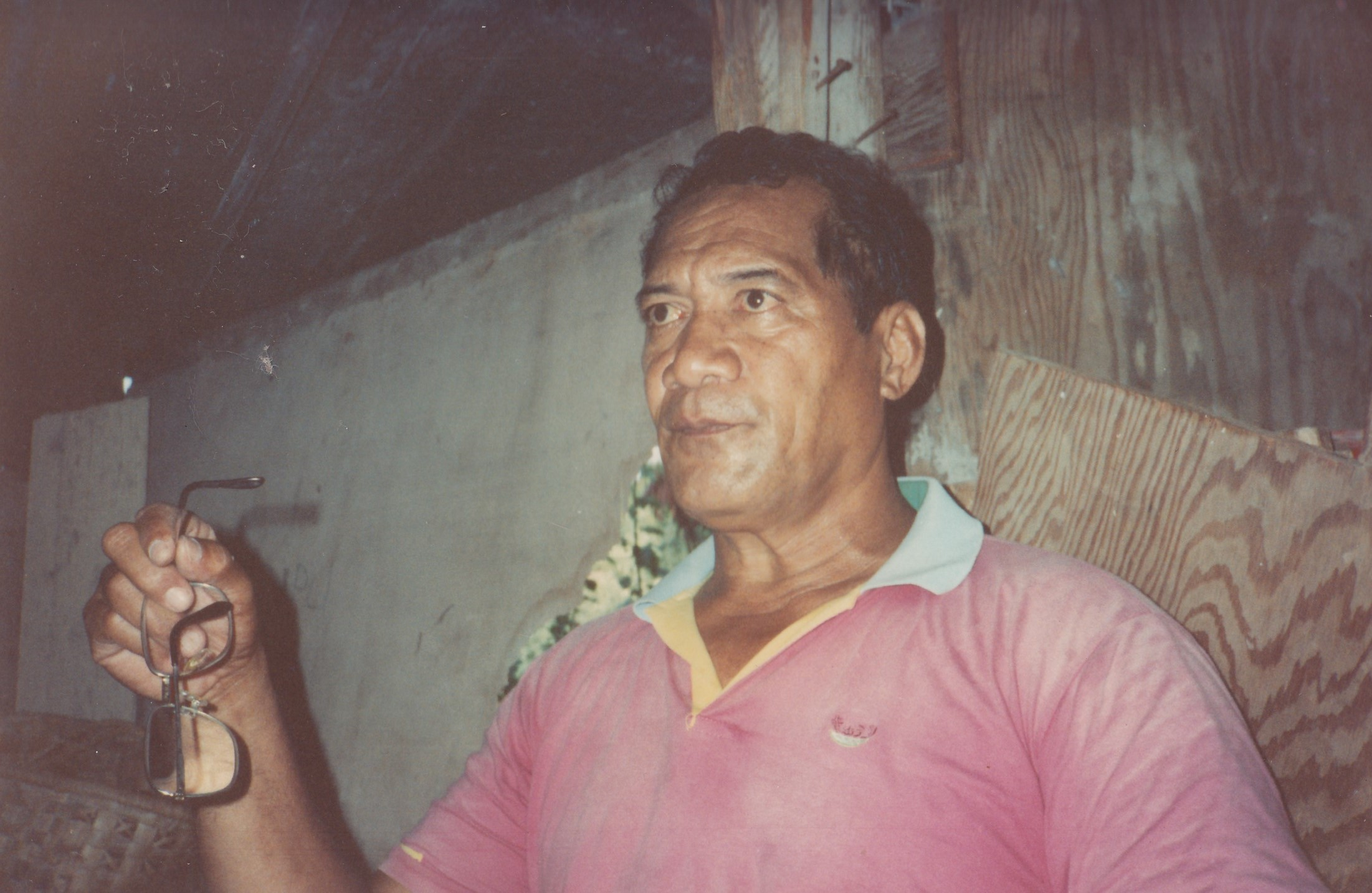
- Born: Vaieretiai Mara; 1936; Avera, Rurutu, Austral archipelago, French polynesia
- Died: 2005 (aged 68–69); Paea, Tahiti
- Resting place: Arue
- Known for: Sculpture
- Notable work: The legend of Hina, Tahitian tamaara'a
- Children: Mateha Gilles Mara

Vaieretiai Mara, better known as Vaiere Mara (1936 - 2005) was a French Polynesian sculptor. He was the first modern Polynesian sculptor, and the first Polynesian artist to sign his works.

Mara was born on the island of Rurutu in the Austral Islands. A student of the sculptor Joseph Kimitete who began as a sculptor of Marquesan Tiki, he quickly developed a personal style which made him the first modern Polynesian sculptor. He is also the first Polynesian artist to have signed his works. He most often signed his works MARA V. Very prolific, he created numerous busts in white coral, as well as innovative Polynesian themes such as the Tahitian tamaaraa (Tahitian lunch), pig hunting and even bas-reliefs in precious wood.

At the end of the sixties, Governor Jean Sicurani personally acquired a monumental Hina. Known from a work by Patrick O Reilly, this sculpture was preserved by the High Commission of the Republic and exhibited for the first time to the public in 2021 at the University of French Polynesia, as part of World Day art.

In 1978 Patrick O'Reilly devoted a book to the sculptor, Bois légendaires de Mara, sculpteur tahitien, published by Hachette Pacifique.

At the end of the 1970s he provided decorations for the Assembly of French Polynesia, on commission from the government of Francis Sandford.

Mara died in 2005 in Arue.

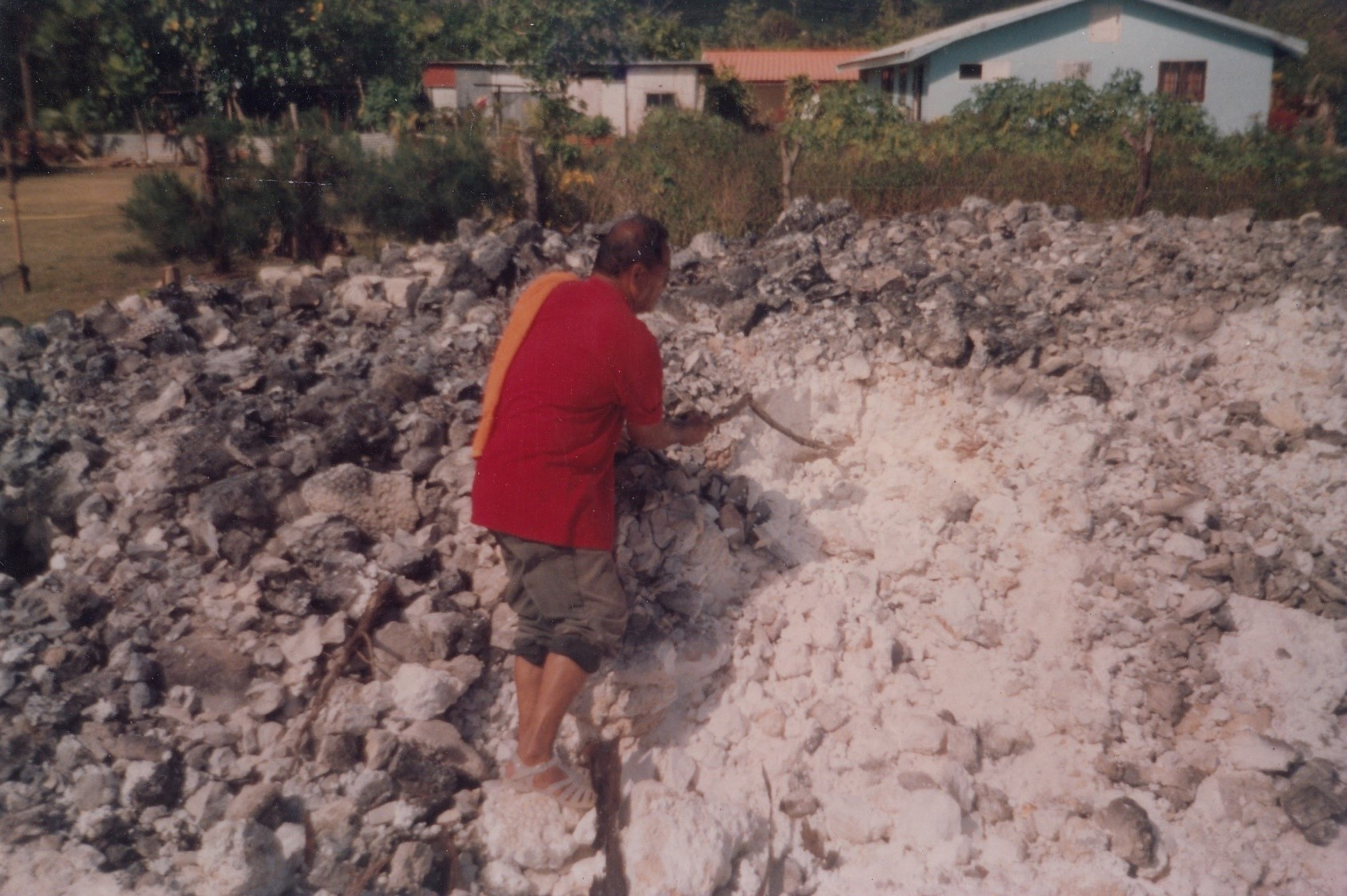
Vaiere Mara digs into fossilized coral in Rurutu

== Posterity ==
Following his death the sculptor quickly fell into obscurity, until an Argentinian gallery owner, Miguel Hunt, rediscovered him in 2012, and brought together a collection of sculptures giving rise to several exhibitions in 2014. In 2015 Professor Jean Guiart published a long text on the sculptor in his journal Connexions, followed in April 2018 by a special issue devoted to the Inventory of Mara's works. In addition to numerous visuals, there are texts by Jean-Luc Coudray and Jean Duday, as well as interviews with the sculptor's children, which allow us to retrace his biography.

In 2019 the sculptor was the subject of Mara V, a documentary film by Jonathan Bougard, an artist who devoted five years of research to him and having found more than 500 sculptures. The documentary was broadcast on Tahiti Nui Television then at the Musée du Quai Branly – Jacques Chirac at the beginning of 2020 in the presence of the director.

A retrospective of his work has long been announced by the Musée de Tahiti et des Îles.
