= Capital Magazine =

- Genre: News
- Created by: François Xavier
- Starring: François Xavier
- Original language: French

Production
- Running time: 1 hr 45 mins

Original release
- Network: Tahiti Nui Television

Capital Magazine, also known as Capital, is a news television program. The program features the biggest topics in the news.
