= François-Xavier Ménage =

French journalist

- Born: 27 June 1980 (age 45); Ploërmel, Brittany, France
- Occupations: Television journalist Reporter
- Employer(s): M6; TF1

François-Xavier Ménage (born 27 June 1980) is a French journalist.

== Biography ==
Xavier was born on 27 June 1980 in Brittany.

He created the television program, Capital, and currently is its host.
