= Te Maeva =

Tahitian dance troupe

Temaeva is a Tahitian dance troupe. It was created by Coco Hotahota in 1962.

== History ==
Temaeva is the oldest dance group in Tahiti. It has included personalities such as Heremoana Maamaatuaiahutapu, Manouche Lehartel, Fabien Dinard, director of the artistic conservatory of Tahiti, as well as many others from the world of culture.

It is the most successful group in the history of the "Heiva i Tahiti" festival. Indeed, the troupe has won the Heiva fifteen times, the first time in 1969 and the last time in 2015. A complete artist, Coco Hotahota was responsible for writing the themes and songs, choreography, costume design and music composition.

Coco Hotahota was greatly inspired by Henri Hiro, to whom he was very close. Their meeting was decisive in the destiny of the troupe. It was from there that Temaeva's themes became much more involved. They denounced extreme modernism, greed, the abandonment of traditional values, instead advocating first and foremost for love of one's land, one's fenua.

== Videography ==
- 1986. Aroha Mai. 49 minutes. Show designed and directed by Coco Hotahota. With Clément Pito, Louise Kimitete. Production: ICA / OTAC (TFTN)
- 1991. Sacred Coco. 26 minutes. Directed by Hina Sylvain. RFO production.
- 2008. Hōro'a, the gift. 27 minutes. Directed by Jacques Navarro-Rovira. Production Kulturprod.
- 2019. Coco Hotahota Te Maeva. 90 minutes. Directed by Jonathan Bougard. In Vivo Prod.
- 2022. Coco Hotahota farereiraa. 81 minutes. Directed by Jonathan Bougard. In Vivo Prod.
