= Jean-Christophe Victor =

French political scientist (1947-2016)

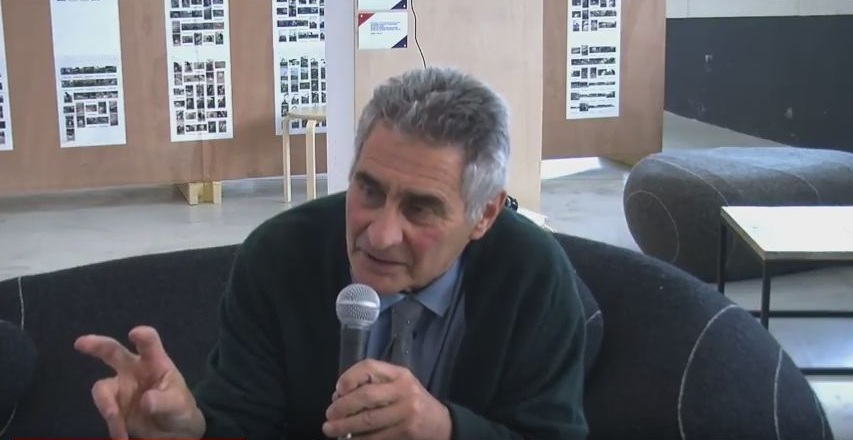
- Born: 30 May 1947; Neuilly-sur-Seine, France
- Died: 28 December 2016 (aged 69); Saint-Jean-de-Fos, France
- Occupations: Political scientist, ethnologist, television host
- Parent: Paul-Émile Victor

Jean-Christophe Victor (30 May 1947 – 28 December 2016) was a French political scientist focusing on international relations. He was the son of the polar explorer Paul-Émile Victor and the television producer Eliane Decrais. He earned master's degrees in Chinese at the National Institute for Oriental Languages and Civilizations, and in political sciences at the University of Paris-1 (1982), as well as a PhD in ethnology on Nepal. He was posted as a diplomat in Afghanistan, worked as policy adviser at NATO in Brussels, and for the Policy Planning Office at the French Ministry of Foreign Affairs.

He was the founder and the director of LEPAC, the Center for Political Studies and Cartographic Analysis, a Paris based think tank. The LEPAC trains international managers in the corporate sector for companies such as Veolia, Vinci, Areva, BP, Cartier and L’Oréal; and public sector organisations including RATP, Council of Europe and the European Union.

Victor taught geopolitics in France and in several foreign universities. The last books he authored on geopolitics are:

- "Le dessous des cartes : Itinéraires géopolitiques" (Beneath the Maps: Geopolitical Routes) 2011, Paris
- "Political Atlas for Teenagers" 2010; Paris
- "Atlas for a Changing World" 2008, Paris, Berlin, Seoul, Tokyo, Taipei.

He was the author of a weekly program on the Franco-German channel ARTE and the French international channel TV5Monde, dealing with geopolitics: Le dessous des cartes ("Beneath the Maps").

Jean-Christophe Victor died on 28 December 2016 from a heart attack.

== Bibliography ==
- Itinéraires géopolitiques, Atlas du dessous des cartes, 2011, Editions Tallandier/Arte Editions
- Le dessous des cartes - Atlas Junior, 2010, (with Dominique Fouchard and Catherine Barichnikoff), Editions Tallandier
- 2007, (with Paul-Emile Victor) Adieu l'Antarctique, Laffont, Paris
- 2007, (with Virginie Raisson and Frank Tétart) Le dessous des cartes - Atlas d'un monde qui change, Editions Tallandier
- 2005, (with Virginie Raisson and Frank Tétart) Le dessous des cartes - Atlas géopolitique, Editions Tallandier
- 1993, L'enjeu afghan ou La cité des murmures, Editions Lattès, Paris
- 1992, Planète Antarctique (with Paul-Émile Victor), Laffont, Paris
- 1985, Armes : France Troisième Grand, éditions Autrement, Paris
