= LEPAC =

French think tank

LEPAC was founded by Jean-Christophe Victor and Virginie Raisson in 1992, as a private, independent think tank based in France and specialised in international geopolitical analysis and foresight studies. The acronym LEPAC stands for "Laboratoire d'études prospectives et d'analyses cartographiques", translated in English as "Foresight Studies and Cartographic Analysis Laboratory".

LEPAC was created to develop geopolitical and cartographic analysis in France and, from the onset, has produced all the studies in support of a geopolitical educational television program broadcast by Franco-German channel Arte. Since its creation in 1992, the centre has expanded the scope of its activities and the research conducted today addresses divers topics and areas of interest for the future of mankind. In 2009 Virginie Raisson became head of the LEPAC, and today both co-founders serve as scientific directors.

== Mission ==
With knowledge transmission a central part of its activities, LEPAC's stated mission is to raise public awareness on global issues by making scientific knowledge available and accessible to a wide audience. As quoted from the website, LEPAC studies seek "to provide a better understanding of global issues" by sorting and organising information in order to recover its meaning. LEPAC research programs and publications have been cited by, among others, journalists, scholars, governments agencies and NGOs.

== Activities ==
The main activities of the centre are research, publications, seminars, conferences and multimedia programs. LEPAC is also regularly called upon by institutions, organisations, government agencies and private businesses to serve as a consultant on a wide range of topics including infrastructure planning, sustainable development, and most human impact related issues.

== Method and team ==
LEPAC relies on a cross-disciplinary, transversal approach, giving an important part to visual representation such as maps, graphs, charts, etc. This specific stance has allowed the centre to explore interconnected questions and identify potential future challenges. The centre's position, admittedly people-oriented, assumes that individuals are as important as collectivities in the promotion and implementation of necessary changes and resilience. Studies at LEPAC are conducted by a team of researchers hailing from diverse backgrounds (Geography, Economics, International Relations, Anthropology, History, Political Science), frequently supported by a network of associate researchers and experts.

== Mapping and data visualisation ==
LEPAC's specialisation in visual and graphic representation of data, geopolitical issues and complex systems is based on two principles:

- Events do not happen by accident, but are influenced by pre-existing factors and geographical constraints in which they appear. Mapping and contextualising research questions is crucial to investigate multifaceted topics.
- The examination of the progression of events, and their subjective perceptions, outline long-term trends and potential challenges, enabling the elaboration of possible solutions.

== "Le Dessous des Cartes" ==
Le Dessous des cartes, which could be translated as "Beyond the Maps", is a weekly popular science television broadcast designed to clarify and make accessible complex geopolitical issues to the general public. The show, which first aired in 1990, is broadcast by Franco-German channel Arte (with the title Mit offenen Karten in German) and international French-speaking channel TV5, and was hosted by LEPAC scientific director Jean-Christophe Victor.

== "Les Futurs du Monde" ==
"Les Futurs du Monde", in English "Futures of the World", is a research program established in 2008 under the scientific direction of Virginie Raisson. The program seeks to explore and define the future global challenges the world will face by 2050. Building on LEPAC's research, a first book was published by Robert Laffont in 2010, entitled "2033, Atlas des Futurs du Monde".

== Bibliography ==
- Le dessous des cartes - Atlas géopolitique, by Jean-Christophe Victor, Virginie Raisson and Frank Tétart, éditions Tallandier, 2005
- Le dessous des cartes - Atlas d'un monde qui change, avec Jean-Christophe Victor et Frank Tétart, éditions Tallandier, 2007
- 2033, Atlas des futurs du monde, éditions Robert Laffont, 2010
- Le Dessous des Cartes. Itinéraires géopolitiques by Jean-Christophe Victor, Arte Éditions/Tallandier
- Un œil sur le monde by Jean-Christophe Victor, Editions Robert Laffont
