= Mapping the World =

French geopolitics programme

- Le Dessous des cartes (in French); Mit offenen Karten (in German)
- Created by: Jean-Christophe Victor
- Presented by: Jean-Christophe Victor (1990–2017); Émilie Aubry (2017–present)
- Country of origin: France; Germany
- Original languages: French; German

Production
- Running time: 10 minutes

Original release
- Network: La Sept
- Release: 1990 – 1992
- Network: Arte
- Release: 1992 – present

Mapping the World (French: Le Dessous des cartes) is a French programme that explains geopolitical contexts using maps as visual support. It was created in 1990 by political scientist Jean-Christophe Victor, who hosted it up until his death in 2016. The programme returned in September 2017 with Émilie Aubry as host and airs weekly on the Franco-German channel Arte.

== Programming and format ==
The show was first aired from 1990 to 1992, on La Sept until it stopped broadcasting, and has been on air since 1992 on the Franco-German channel Arte. The show is broadcast every Saturday at 20h00 (Paris local time, UTC+1) and rebroadcast several times a week. The format of the show has changed little since the first episode. However, the episode length expanded from 7 to 11 minutes. The transition from 11 to 26 minutes referred to by Jean-Christophe Victor in 2002 was abandoned.

== Structure of the show ==
In general, the show runs as follows:

- Generic top
- Introduction – the presenter introduces the topic of the show on a neutral background
- Development – maps, animations and sometimes pictures while the presenter talks.
- Conclusion – the presenter concludes the program on a neutral point of view
- Bibliography of books which served as sources and / or may give the viewer further insight into the topic
- End Credits

== Maps and visualization methods ==
Topographic maps are based on the Ordnance Survey Oxford Cartographers. The most commonly used map projection is that of Eckert (the Pseudo-cylindrical projection). The show also uses satellite imagery from Google Earth and the first use was in the episode named: "Nigeria, rich state poor country."

== Program production cycle ==
The Laboratoire d'études politiques et d'analyses cartographiques (LEPAC) produces about forty episodes a year for the channel Arte. The subjects for most episodes are decided a year in advance to allow time for production. This delay in the selection of themes allows a certain hindsight regarding the chosen topic. However, on occasion, the topic of an episode is more closely related to current events. For example, the episode "Tsunami, a natural phenomenon" aired just three months after the events in South-East Asia.

== Subjects of the show ==
Of the 300 programs (from March 2001 to May 2008), 210 (70%) have a geographical approach and 84 (28%) have a thematic approach. 6 issues remain unclassifiable: introspective (ex: "La Methode le Dessous des Cartes") or dreamers (ex: "A journey with Corto Maltese, Turkey to Samarkand"). For information and the geographical most commonly accepted:

- Africa (29)
- Latin America (21)
- Anglo-Saxon America (12)
- Europe (53)
- Polar worlds (11)
- Central Asia (10)
- East Asia (35)
- Middle East (36)
- Oceania (1)

Anecdote: The issue of 29 March 2000, for the week of April 1, is a parody of the show itself. The producing team of the show made what could be the episode of 1 April 3000 by offering a retrospective view of the past thousand years.

== Methods and objectives ==
In a special 10th birthday episode named "La méthode du Dessous des Cartes", the aims of the show were outlined:

- Give way to Geography
- Give meaning through History
- Cross disciplines
- Everything is connected
- Avoid Ethnocentrism
- Giving a try at Futures studies
- Take a stand

The main, oft repeated aim of the show is "to understand rather than to inform."

== Awards ==
- Prix Encyclopædia Universalis 1995
- Grand Prix Video 1996 of the Académie Charles Cros
- La Clio de l'image 1997

== Publications ==
=== Books ===
- Jean-Christophe Victor, Frank Tétart and Virginie Raisson, Le Dessous des cartes : Atlas géopolitique, map of Frederick Lernoud, ed. Arte and Tallandier, 2005, (ISBN 2847342346).
- Jean-Christophe Victor, Frank Tétart and Virginie Raisson, Le Dessous des cartes 2 : Tome 2, Atlas d'un monde qui change, map of Lernoud Frederick, ed. Arte and Tallandier, 2007, (ISBN 2847344667).
- Jean-Christophe Victor, Frank Tétart and Virginie Raisson, Le Dessous des Cartes : Coffret en 2 volumes : Atlas géopolitique; Atlas d'un monde qui change, map of Lernoud Frederick, ed. Arte and Tallandier, 2008 (ISBN 284734540X).

=== DVD ===
Each semester, Arte Video and LEPAC publish a DVD. The DVD includes 12 to 20 episodes of the show regarding a theme. DVDs released so far:

- Latin America, the other America;
- African continent;
- The unity of China;
- USA, an imperialistic geography;
- Geopolitics and Religion;
- Europe, a model geopolitics?;
- Europe as an alternative?;
- Polar worlds;
- Middle East geopolitical pivot;
- A planet in relief.

=== Textbooks ===
- Le dessous des cartes Terminale : L’espace mondial
- Le dessous des cartes Première : L’Europe et la France
- Le dessous des cartes Seconde : Les Hommes occupent et aménagent la Terre
- Le dessous des cartes Troisième : Le Monde d’aujourd’hui
