= John Mairai =

French Polynesian poet and playwright (1945–2023)

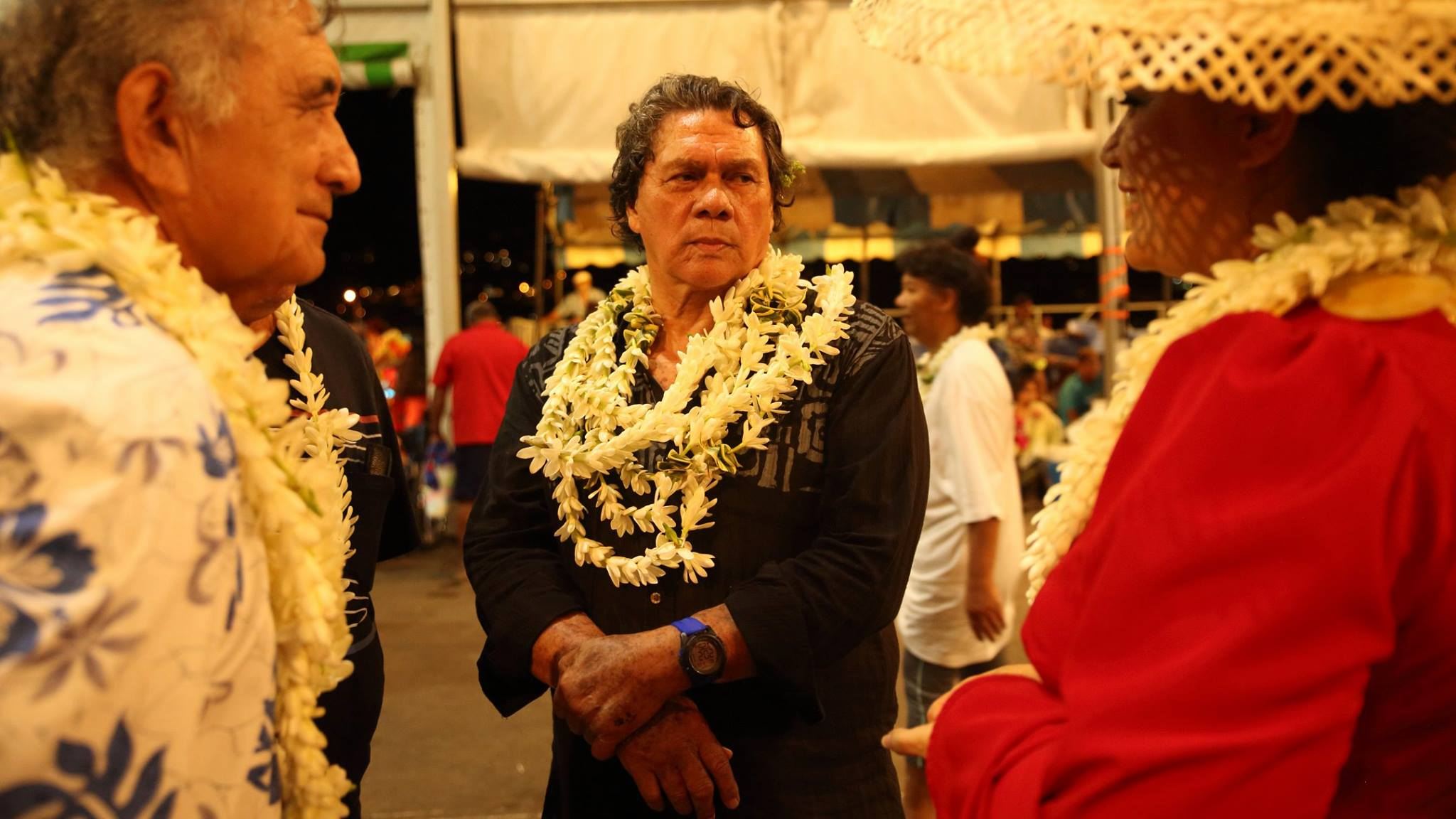
Mairai with Oscar Temaru in 2017

John Tapu Mairai (28 November 1945 – 22 December 2023) was a French Polynesian poet, actor, orator, playwright, teacher, journalist, and broadcaster. He was a pioneer of Reo Tahiti theater and a member of the Tahitian Academy.

== Biography ==
Mairai was born on 28 November 1945 in Papeete, and grew up in Mataiva in the Tuamotus. He was educated at Lycée Paul-Gauguin in Tahiti before studying fine arts at Graceland University in the United States. On returning to French Polynesia he worked as a sailor, before joining the Territorial Office for Cultural Action. In 1983 he founded the theater company Teata Maruao ("theatre of the dawn"), and in 1987 produced Maro Putoto, an adaptation of Shakespeare's Macbeth in Reo Tahiti. In 1992 he produced Te Manu Tane, a Reo Tahiti adaptation of Molière's Le Bourgeois gentilhomme. He also produced other plays based on Tahitian history, including "Opuhara" and "Tavi roi et la loi". He later worked as a sports journalist, as editor of Les Nouvelles, and as a television presenter for Tahiti Nui Television. From 1999 onwards, he taught at the Artistic Conservatory of French Polynesia.

In July 2019 he was made a knight of the Ordre des Arts et des Lettres. In June 2020 he was made a knight of the Order of Tahiti Nui. In June 2020 he was elected to the Tahitian Academy.

Mairai died on 22 December 2023, at the age of 78.
