= Patrick O'Reilly (ethnologist) =

French ethnologist (1900–1988)

The Reverend Patrick O'Reilly FMS
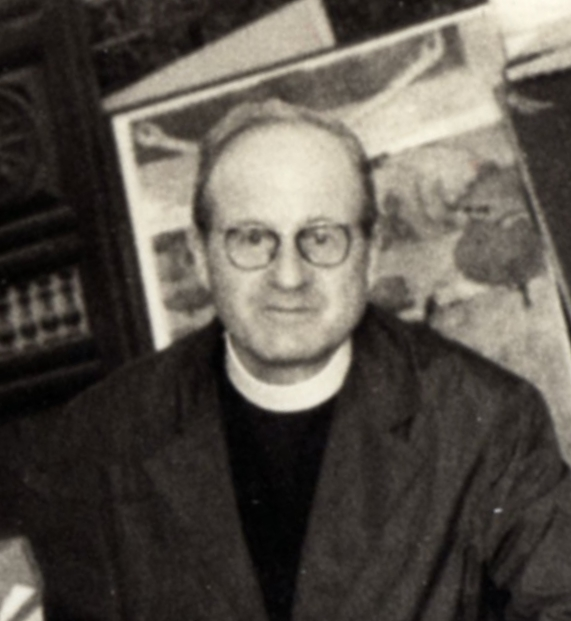
- Born: May 19, 1900; Saint-Mihiel, Grand Est, France
- Died: August 6, 1988 (aged 88); 14th arrondissement, Paris, France
- Education: École pratique des hautes études
- Occupation: Ethnologist
- Organization: Paul Gauguin Museum

Patrick O'Reilly, FMS (May 19, 1900 in Saint-Mihiel – August 6, 1988 in Paris 14th) was a French Marist priest and ethnologist responsible for the organization of the Gauguin Museum in Tahiti. He is the author of hundreds of works on the Pacific, which still constitute one of the main sources of information for students of Oceania.

== Biography ==
Son of André Farell O'Reilly, a battalion commander killed in the early days of the First World War, and Jeanne Gautier, as a young boy O'Reilly studied in religious establishments in Le Havre and Saintes. He continued to higher studies at the Sorbonne then at the École Pratique des Hautes Études. He graduated from the Institute of Ethnology in Paris.

In 1922, he entered the congregation of Marists. He was ordained a priest in 1928. He was chaplain of the Reunion of Catholic Students from 1930 to 1975. In these positions, he met students called who later became prominent, notably François Mitterrand of whom he remained a confidant until the end of his days. He took courses at the École du Louvre.

He made several ethnological missions in Oceania: from 1936 to 1937, he was responsible for an important CNRS mission (this followed by two others, in 1949 and 1953, as an individual). It was during one of these missions that he met Herman Somuk on Buka Island. He encouraged Somuk to express himself through drawing. Back in Paris, O Reilly organized an exhibition of these drawings which met with some success. Jean Dubuffet acquired some of these works. Somuk died in 1965. The Musée du Quai Branly dedicated an exhibition to him in 2020.

Designated as secretary general of the Society of Oceanists with the agreement of Maurice Leenhardt in the fall of 1944, he held this position until 1973.

From 1961, he lobbied for the creation of a Gauguin Museum, with little success until 1964. That year, supported by the Singer-Polignac Foundation, he organized the establishment of the current museum. Later, in 1973, se set up the historical section of the Museum of Tahiti and the Islands. He then became passionate about the work of Vaiere Mara, a Tahitian sculptor born in Rurutu in 1936, and devoted his Sunday research to him, which led to the publication of Legendary Woods of Mara, Tahitian sculptor, in 1979.

Ill and retired, Patrick O'Reilly died on August 6, 1988 in the 14th arrondissement of Paris.

== Legacy ==
The correspondence between O'Reilly and Odette Teissier du Cros, his friend and confidante, is now in the archives of the Académie des Hauts Cantons.

== Decoration ==
- Knight of the Legion of Honour

== Distinctions ==
- Member of the Society of Oceanists (1945)
- Member of the Overseas Academy of Sciences (1956)
