= Chief Miko =

French Polynesian speaker, sculptor, navigator, musician, customary chief and activist

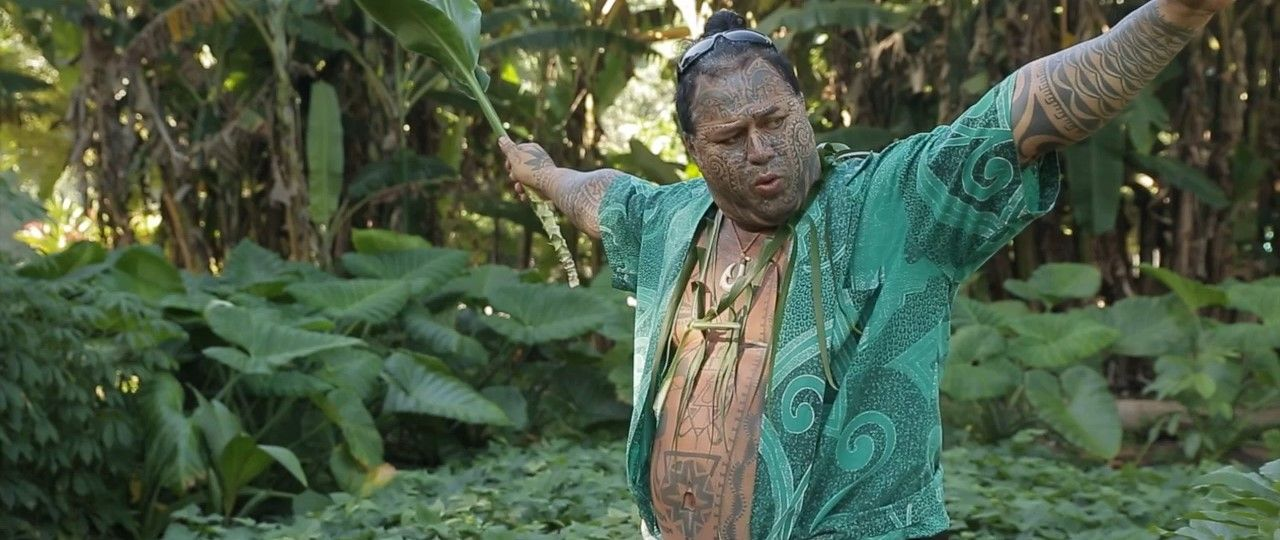
- Born: Miko Pouira Krainer; 3 April 1959 (age 67); Papeete
- Known for: Orator, sculptor, traditional navigator, musician, singer, traditional leader and activist

Michel Toofa Pouira Krainer, known as Chief Miko (born 3 April 1959) is a French Polynesian speaker, sculptor, traditional navigator, musician, singer, customary chief and activist. He played a major role in the Polynesian cultural revival, particularly in the revival of Polynesian tattoos.

== Biography ==
=== Origins ===
Michel was adopted by his grandfather the day he was born. He spent his childhood in Arue, between the mountains and the lagoon. Michel claims that he is the only one in his class to have obtained his school certificate.

=== Sculpture ===
From a young age, Michel's uncle, the sculptor Vaiere Mara, trained Michel how to search for materials to work with, as well as how to carve wood using a gouge and a mallet. In 1972 he joined Arue's dance troupe, Fetia, later renamed Ahutoru Nui in 1989. He was twelve years old when the raatira (troop leader) Teipo Temaiana took advantage of his knowledge to have him make instruments for the collective.

=== Traditional navigation ===
At this time, Michel was told that his father was making canoes in Honolulu, and he set out to find him there. After a year dedicated to learning the local language, he returned to high school in Oahu. He was adopted by a family of artists from Waikiki. A founding member of the Polynesian Voyaging Society, Billy Richmond, then worked on the construction site of the Hokule'a canoe.

After the baccalaureate, Michel obtained his arborist diploma. He created a pruning company, Genesis Tahitian Tree Service. Having won large contracts in California, he soon employed a dozen people. In 1990 the young Michel Pouira Kreiner became a dollar millionaire. He then organized big Polynesian festivals. In 1992 Michel Pouira Kreiner took part in the creation of the organization Nā Kalai Waʻa Moku o Hawaiʻi. From 1994 they began an ambitious project: a traditional canoe of more than 16 meters, called Makali'i . The project ended with a three-month navigation to the island of Mau Piailug, Satawal. Being the only Polynesian on board a crew made up of Micronesians, Michel continued the journey for several months and visited the corners of Micronesia.

In 1999, back on Oahu, Michel welcomed the Te Aurere canoe. He then met the traditional tattooist Purotu, a member of the crew, and undertook the process of having his entire body tattooed the old-fashioned way, using combs. He then decided to rename himself Chief Miko. He left the management of his business to his sons and threw himself headlong into pursuits of navigation and sculpture.

The Nā Kalai Waʻa Moku o Hawaiʻi organization then offered a traditional canoe to Mau Piailug, to thank him for the help he provided in the numerous navigations aboard the Hokule'a canoe. Chief Miko participated in the construction of this project called Alingano Maisu. According to Mau Piailug's instructions, the bow of the canoe is adorned with a sculpture of an albatross, a symbol of the bond that unites the peoples of the Pacific. The canoe was gifted to Mau Piailug during Hōkūleʻa 's 2007 voyage "Kū Holo Mau". Miko himself steered the canoe to Satawal Island, where on March 18, 2007, Mau Piailug presided over a traditional Pwo ceremony for the navigators. Five Hawaiians and eleven others were inducted as master navigators, including Mau's son, Sesario Sewralur, current captain of the canoe Alingano Maisu.

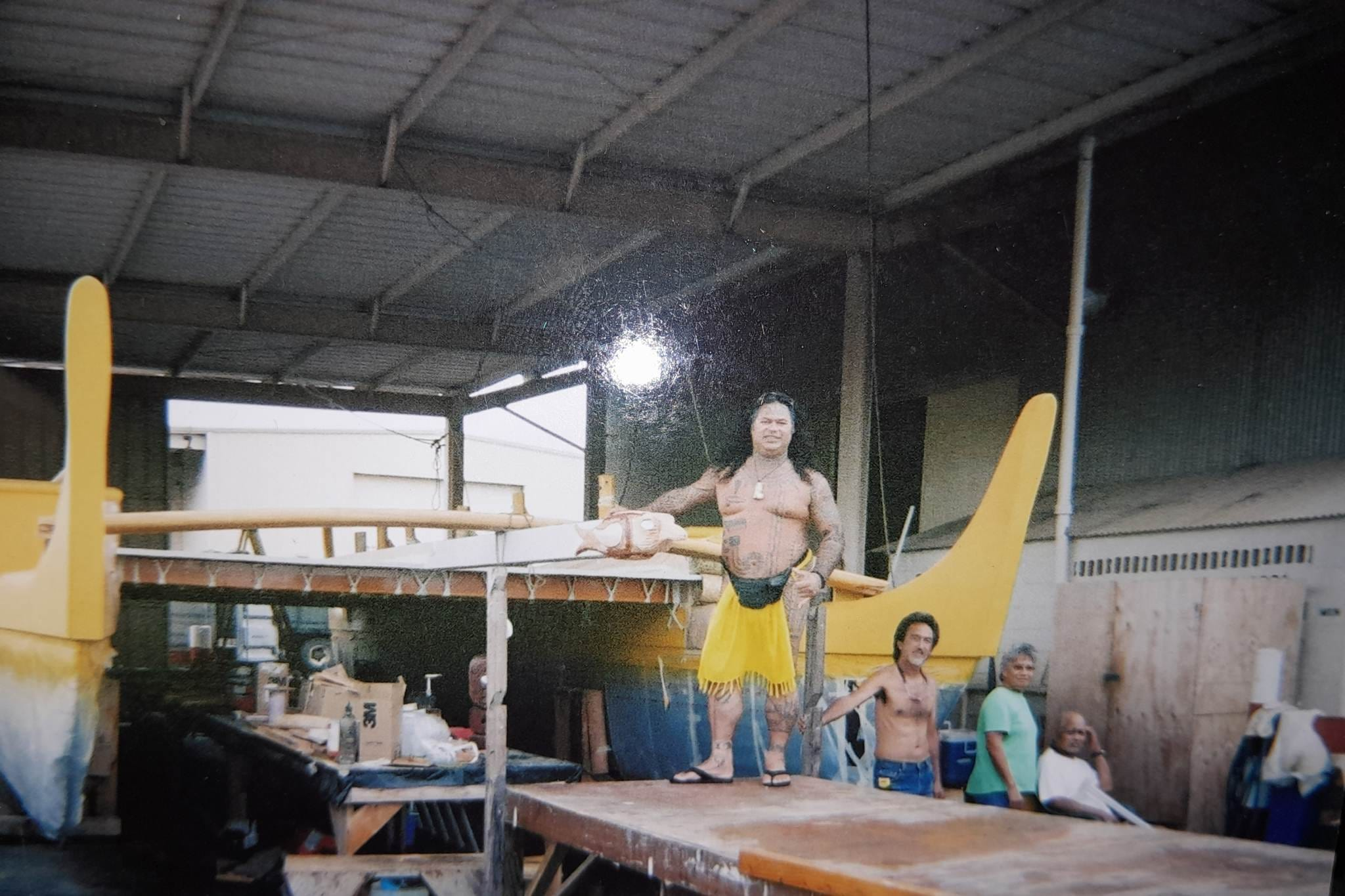
Chief Miko in front of Alingano Maisu Wa'a 2006

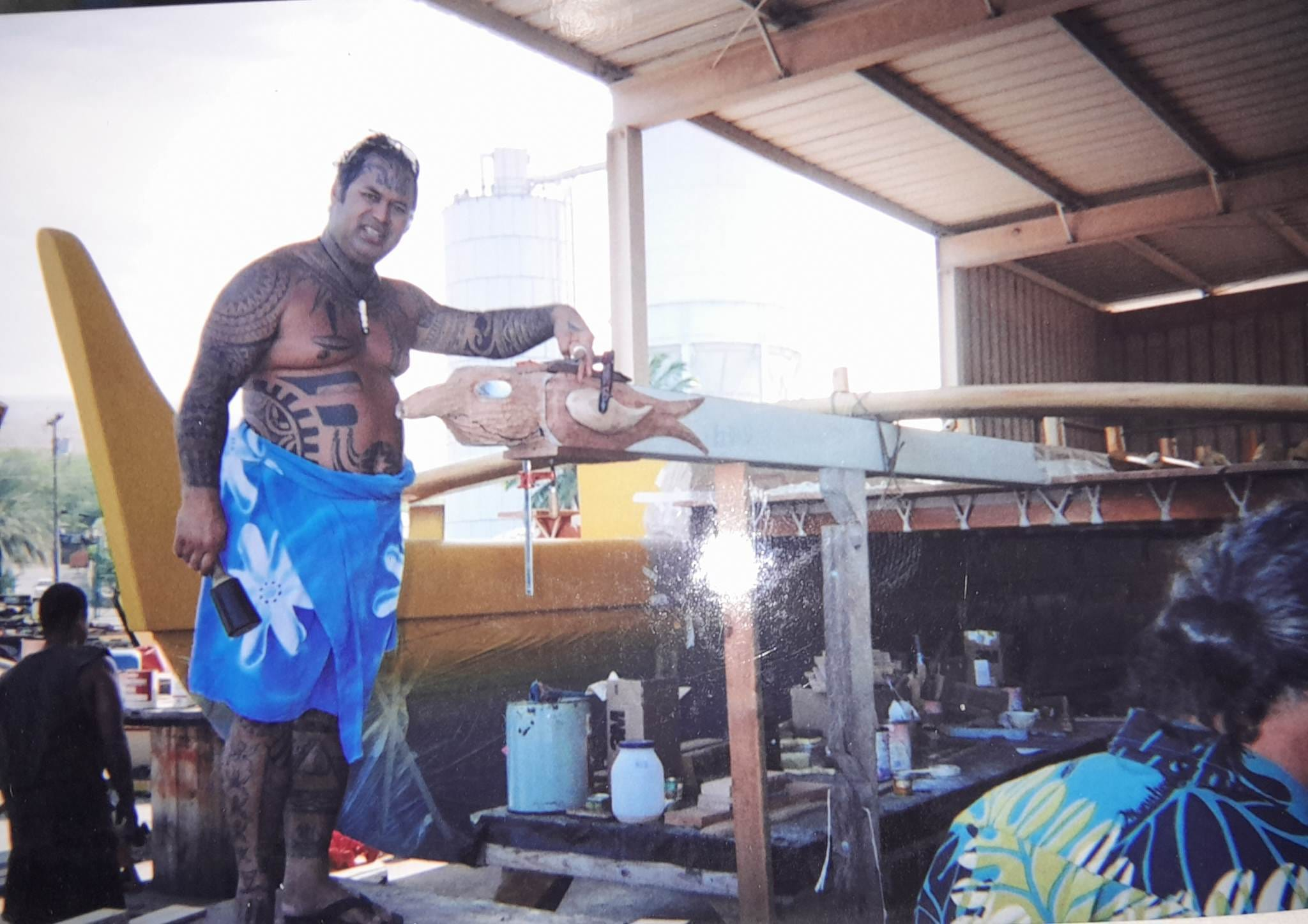
Chief Miko carving Alingano Maisu canoe

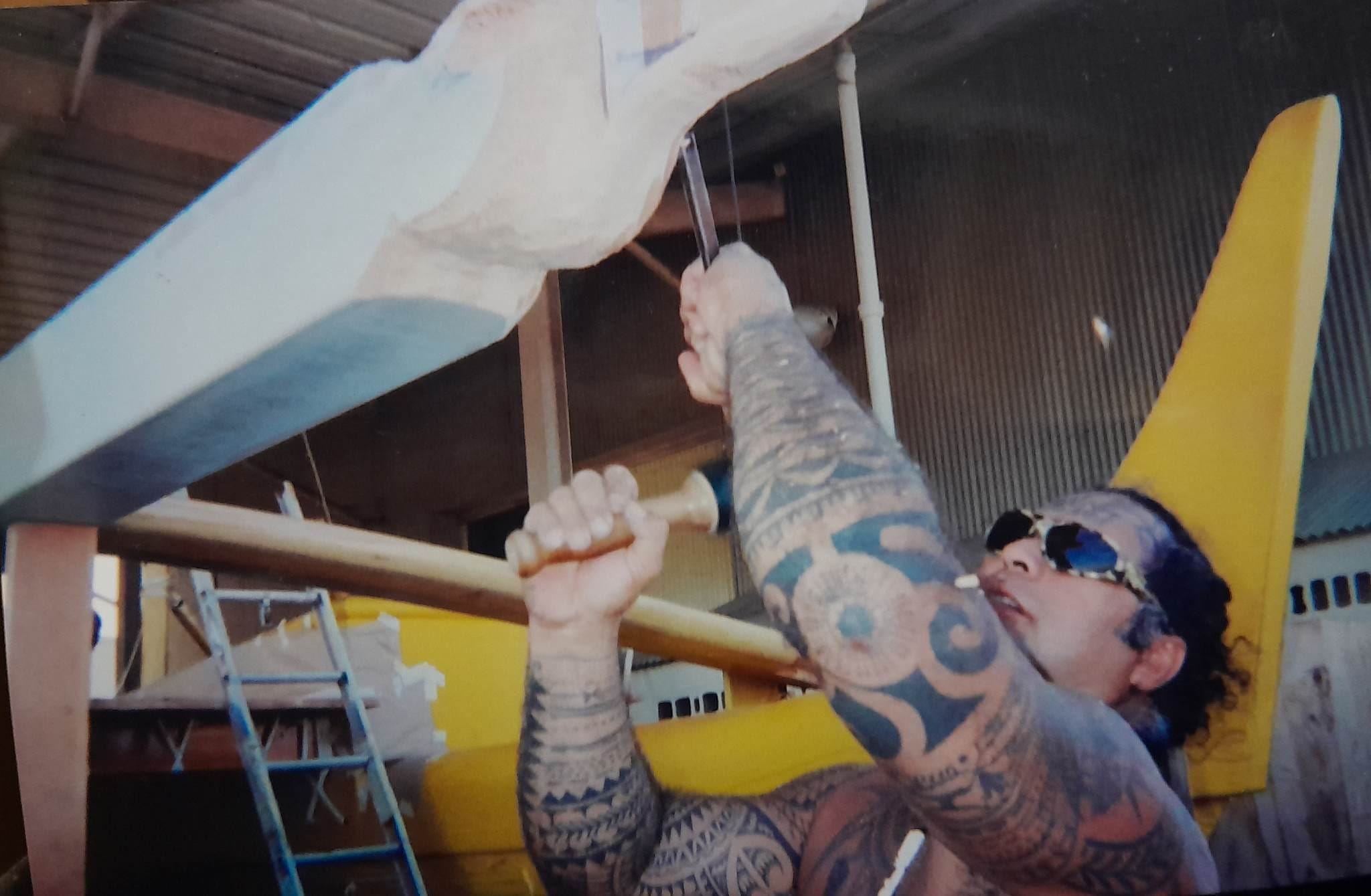
Chief Miko and the carved albatross on the bow of the Alingano Maisu canoe

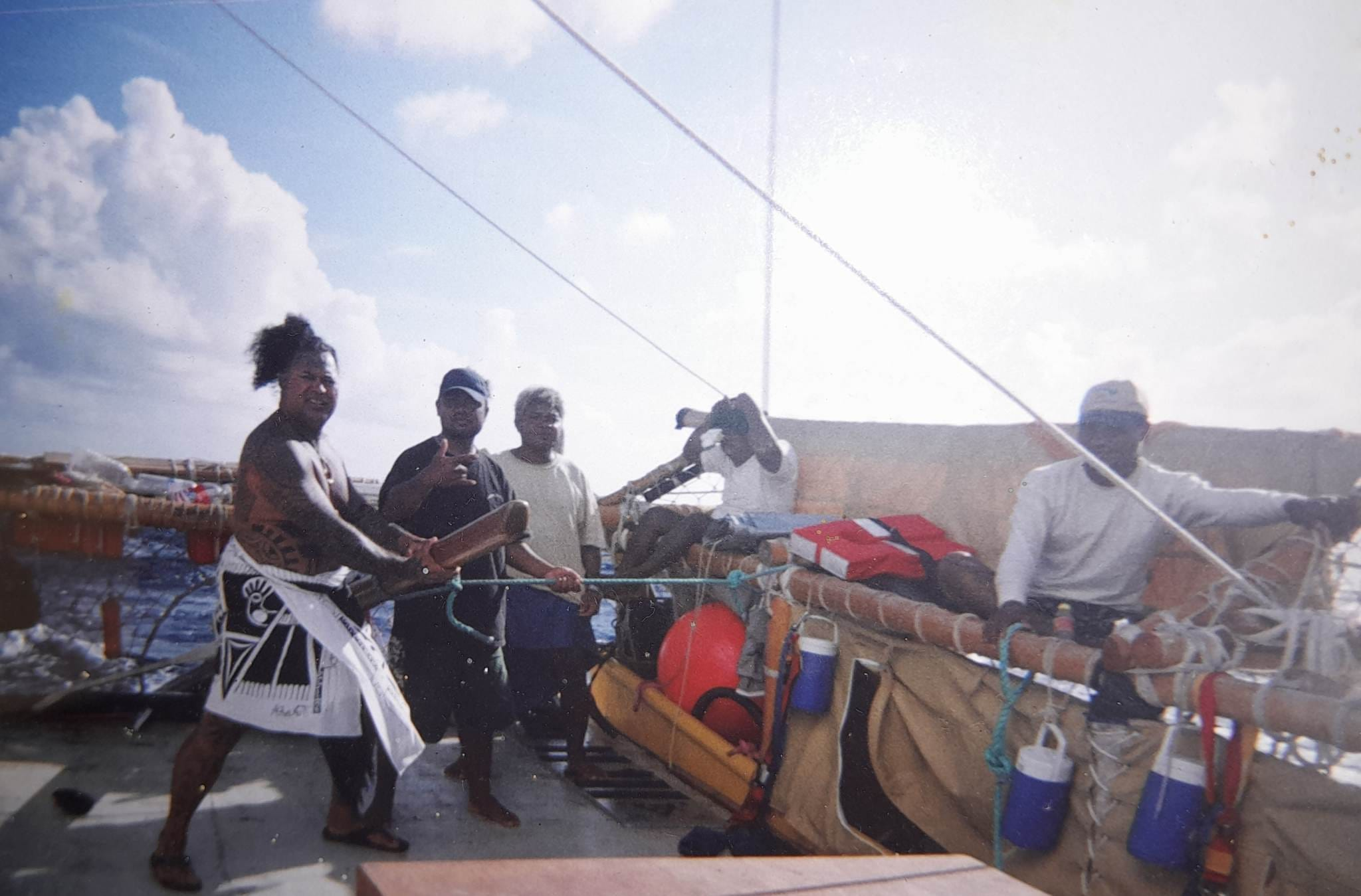
Navigating from Palau FSM island's to Yap aboard Alingano Maisu

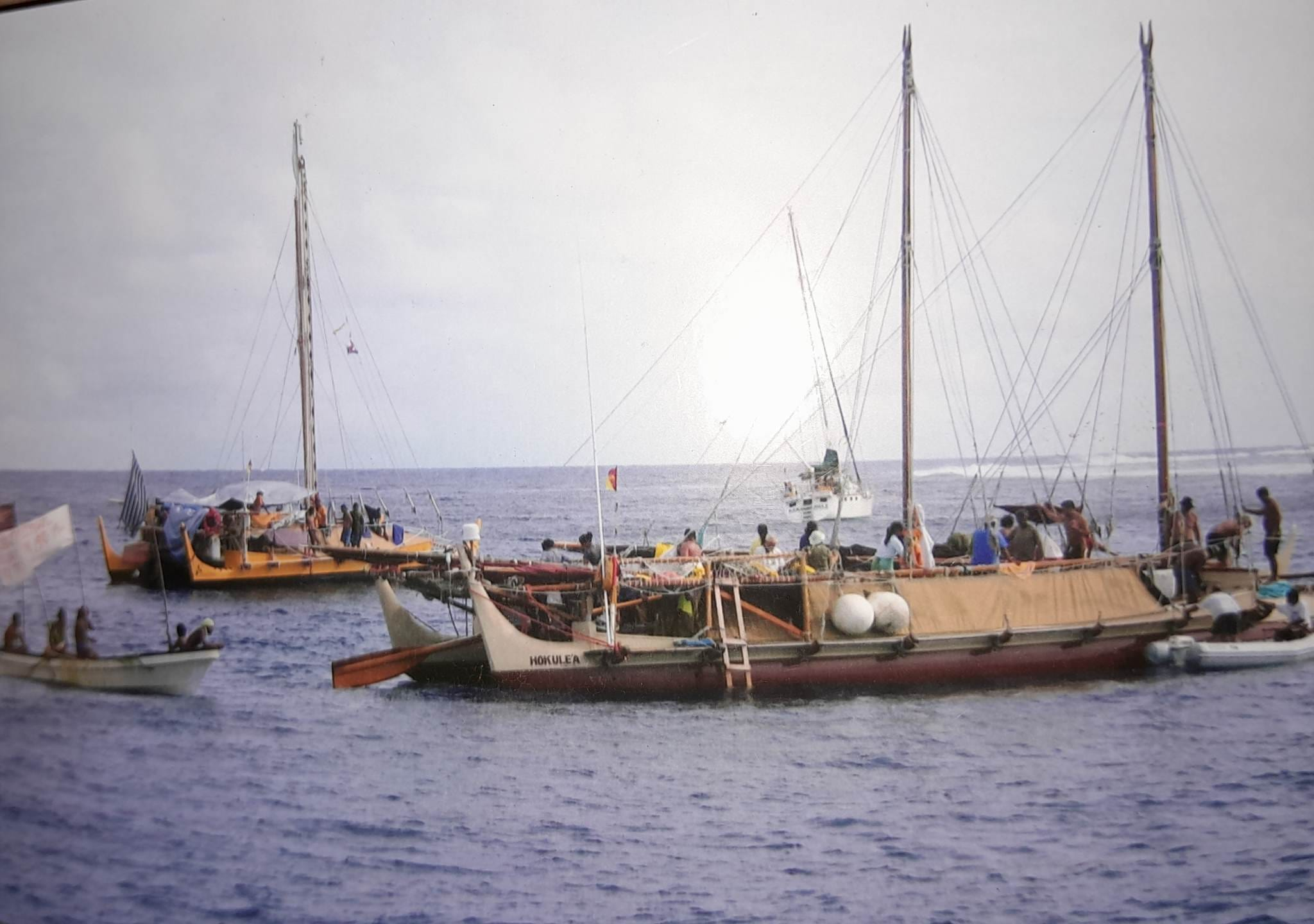
Arrival of the Hòkūle'a and Alingano Maisu pirigs at Satawal in Micronesia

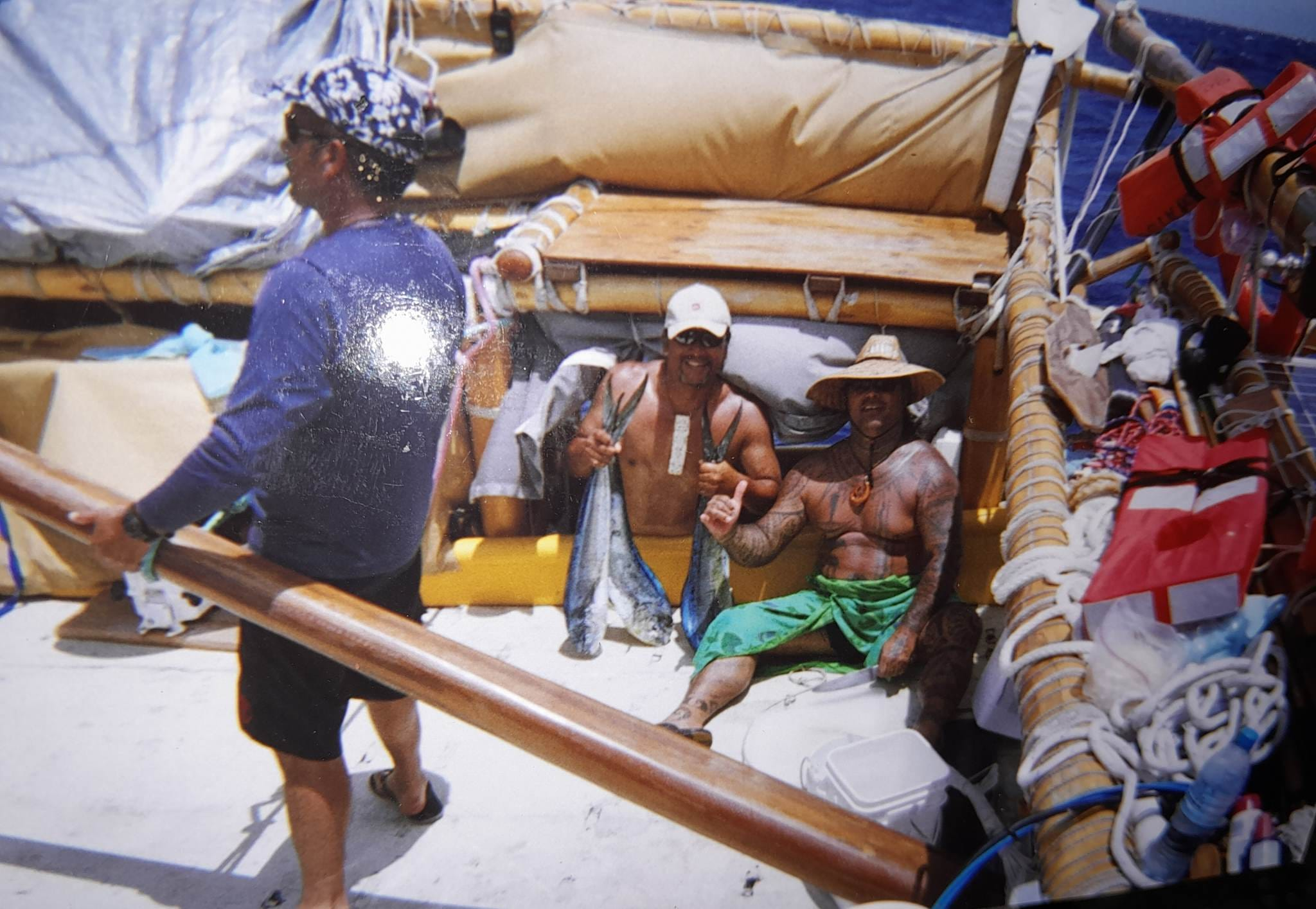
Chief Miko aboard Hokulea

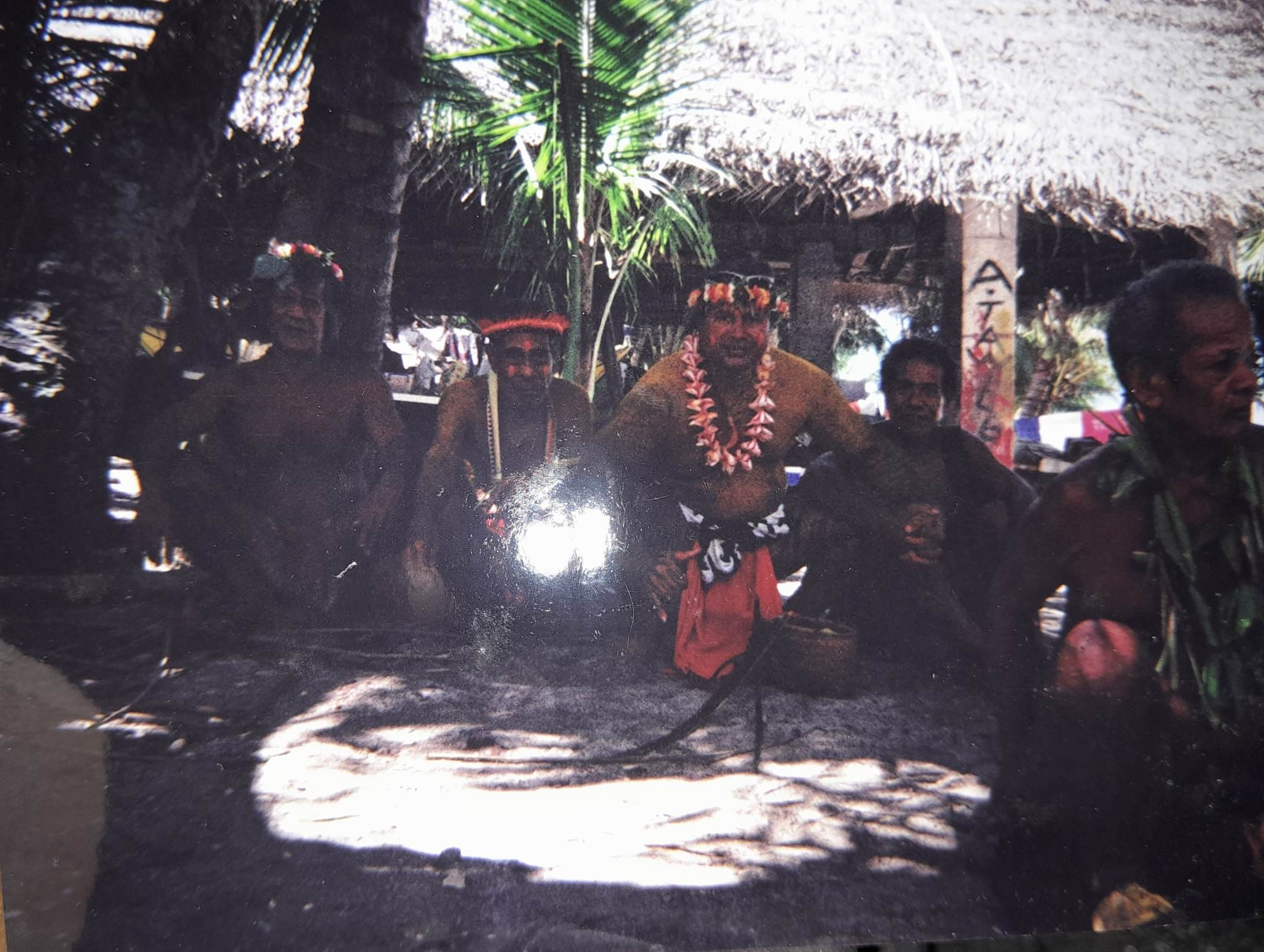
Chief Miko Surrounded by many Elders during traditional Navigation Ceremony

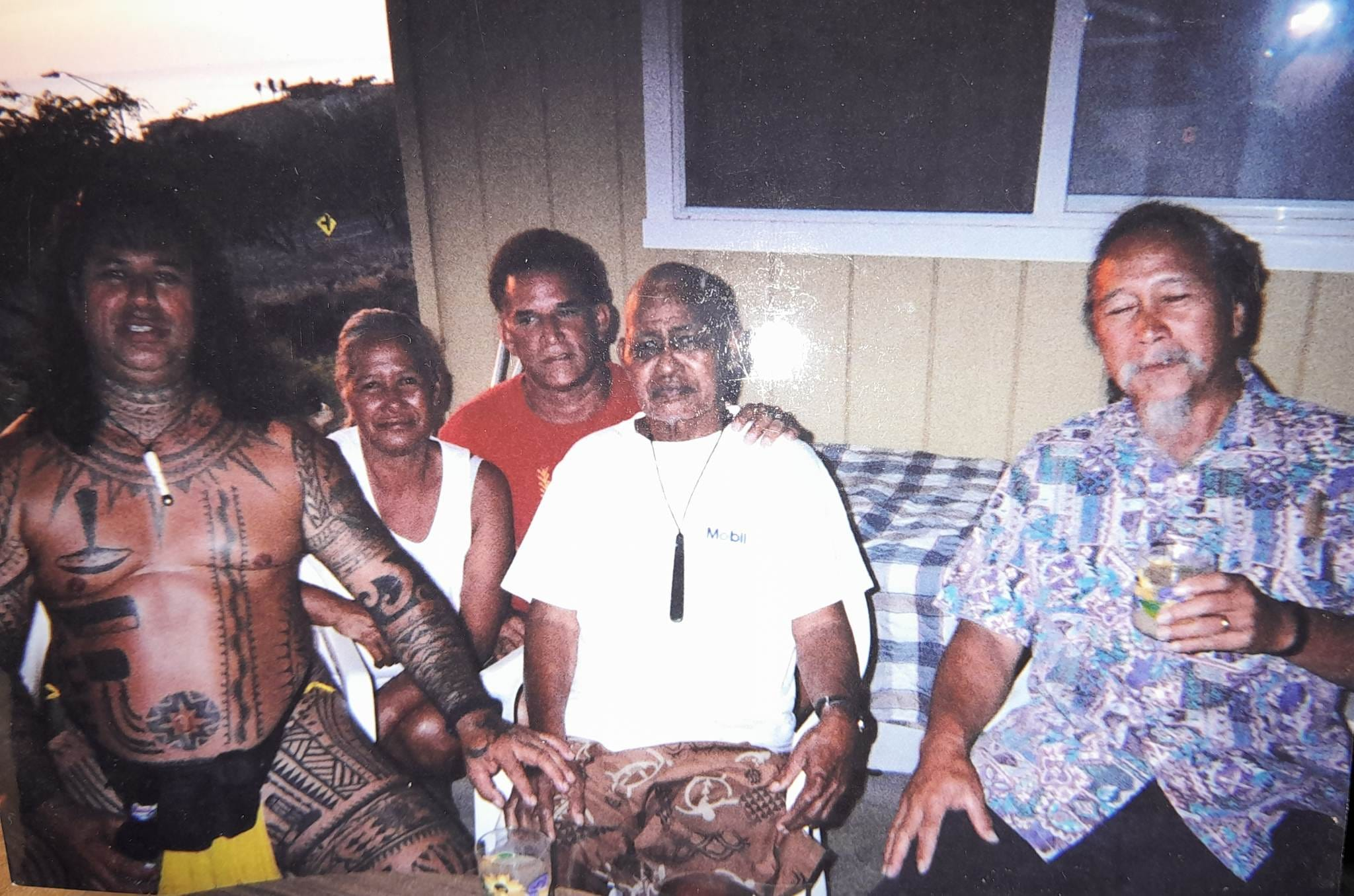
Chief Miko celebrating Mau Piailug Birthday at Kohola- Hawai'i big island

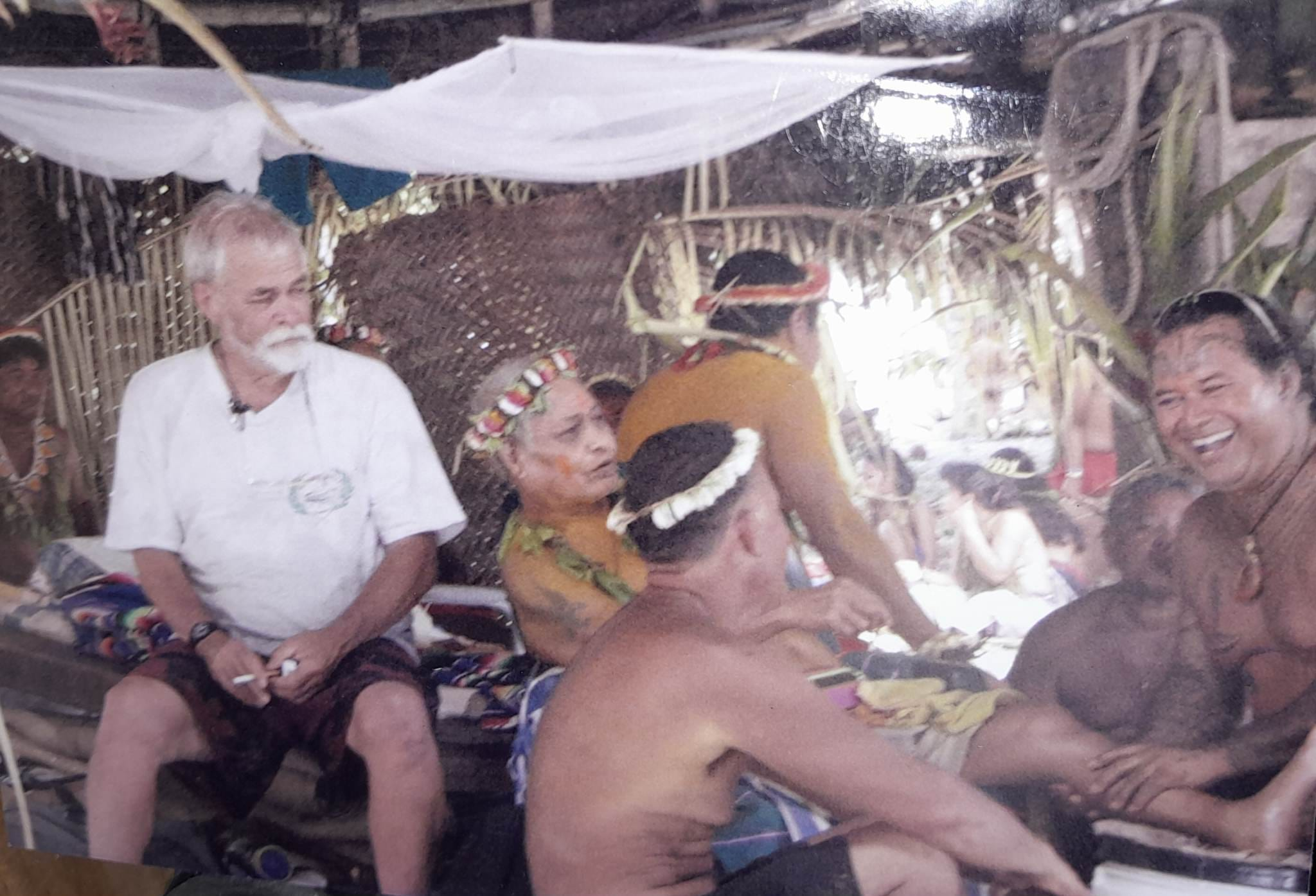
Mau Piailug getting a foot massage by Chief Miko

=== Return to Tahiti ===
Chief Miko returned to Tahiti in 2008, after more than 25 years in Hawaii. He became raatira (leader) of the orero (speakers) of the Heikura Nui troupe. With Heikura Nui, they won two grand prizes at Heiva i Tahiti. Without a written title deed, he chose to settle on the land of his paternal ancestors in Arue, in a traditional bamboo house with a large vegetable garden. There he carved wood and made Tahitian medicines with the medicinal plants he cultivated. On June 24, 2013, the Papeete court ordered his expulsion. Chief Miko then had to move into a modern house. It was there that he took on the challenge of making large wooden Tahitian tikis for the Chinese market.

=== Teroronui Contemporary Creation Center in Papeete ===
In 2014 Miko joined the CCCTP collective, Center de Création Contemporaine Teroronui de Papeete, a transdisciplinary collective chaired by Jonathan Bougard, whose objective was to work towards the perpetuation of local cultures while supporting their relationships with modern communications. Within this collective Miko found artists such as Max Tohitika, Julien Magre, Massimo Colombini, Moana Heitaa and the sculptors Pitore and Teva Victor. They exhibited at the Maison de la Culture de Tahiti, Te Fare Tauhiti Nui, then at the University of French Polynesia. According to a text by Jean-Louis Poitevin, “The CCTP intended “giving the desire for image a central place in the cultural and social life of Tahiti(...)" From tradition to the diffusion of this tradition, from tattooing with a comb to new technologies, this exhibition questions and provides its answers, defines what it means to be an artist today in Tahiti and gives pride of place to artists as well. Polynesians than with offbeat looks." Beyond the exhibition of paintings, sculptures, Indian inks, happenings and live creations are organized : Chief Miko sculpts live with a chainsaw, then traditional tattoo sessions with a comb, a seminar around these aspects follow.

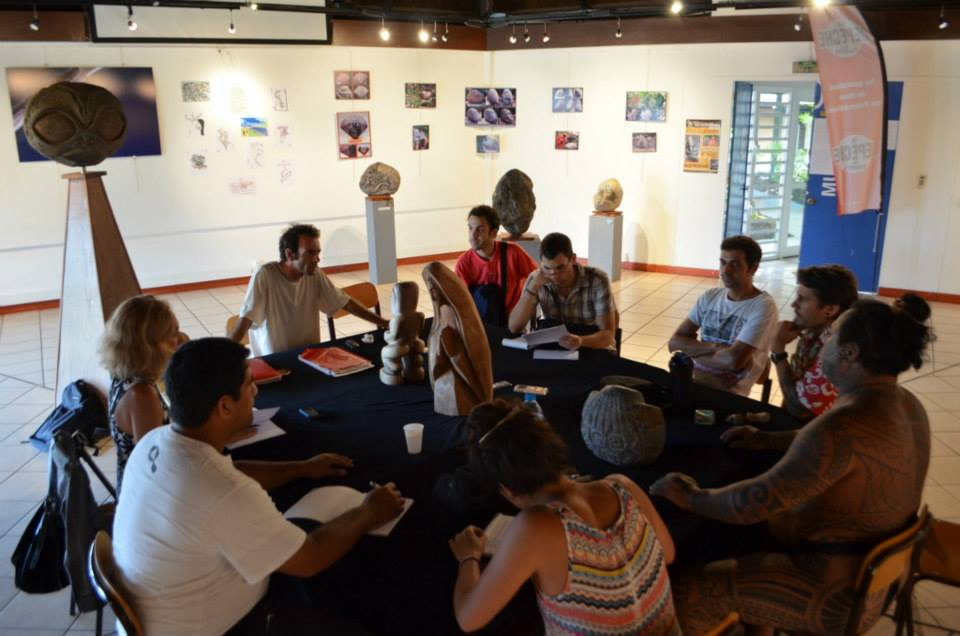
CCCTP Assembly in 2014

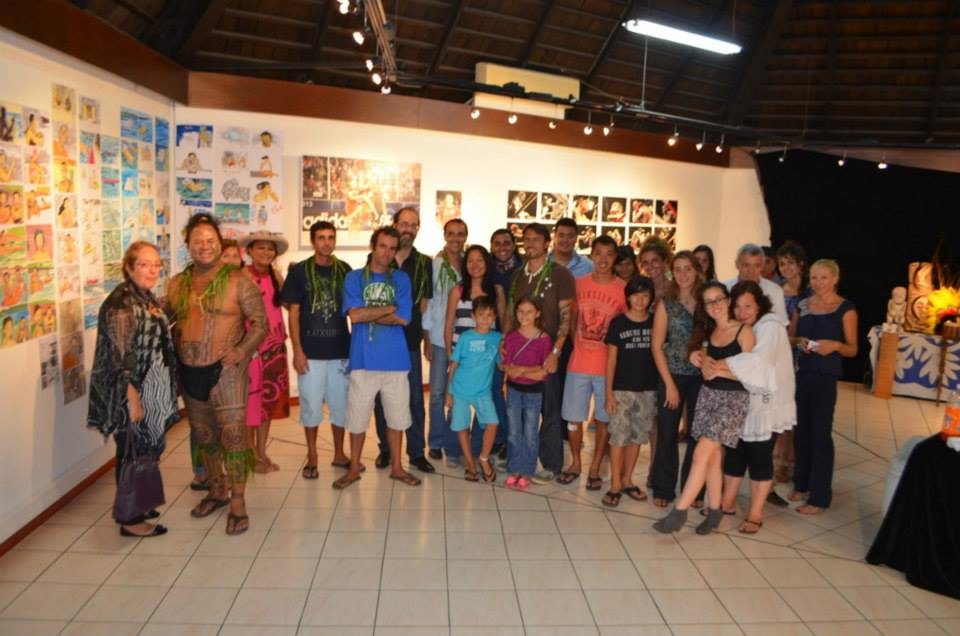
CCCTP 2014 Opening

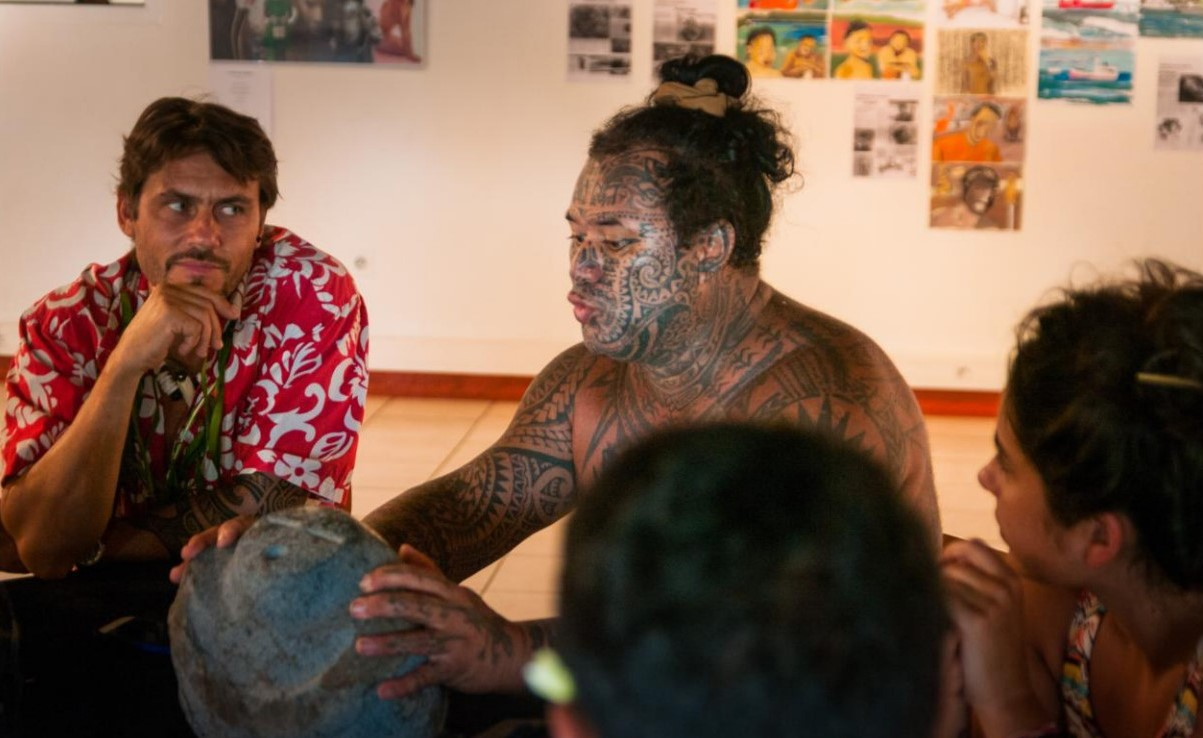
Chief Miko and Teva Victor

=== Polynesian Kingdom of Atooi ===
But Chief Miko is too cramped in this institutional framework. Within the Polynesian Kingdom of Atooi governed by King Aleka he transformed into a real activist, and entered into open conflict with the local and French authorities. He made the headlines of Polynesian news for his outrageous actions such as the occupation and claim of ownership of the Arahurahu marae of Paea, and attracted the animosity of part of the Polynesian population, who do not wish to return to the times of their ancestors.

== Videography ==
Chief Miko features in the documentary Tatau, la culture d'un art, directed in 2014 by Jean-Philippe Joaquim.

In 2017 Chief Miko was the subject of a documentary film co-directed by Jonathan Bougard and Jean-Philippe Joaquim, Miko, le chef voyant.
