= Andreas Dettloff =

German visual artist

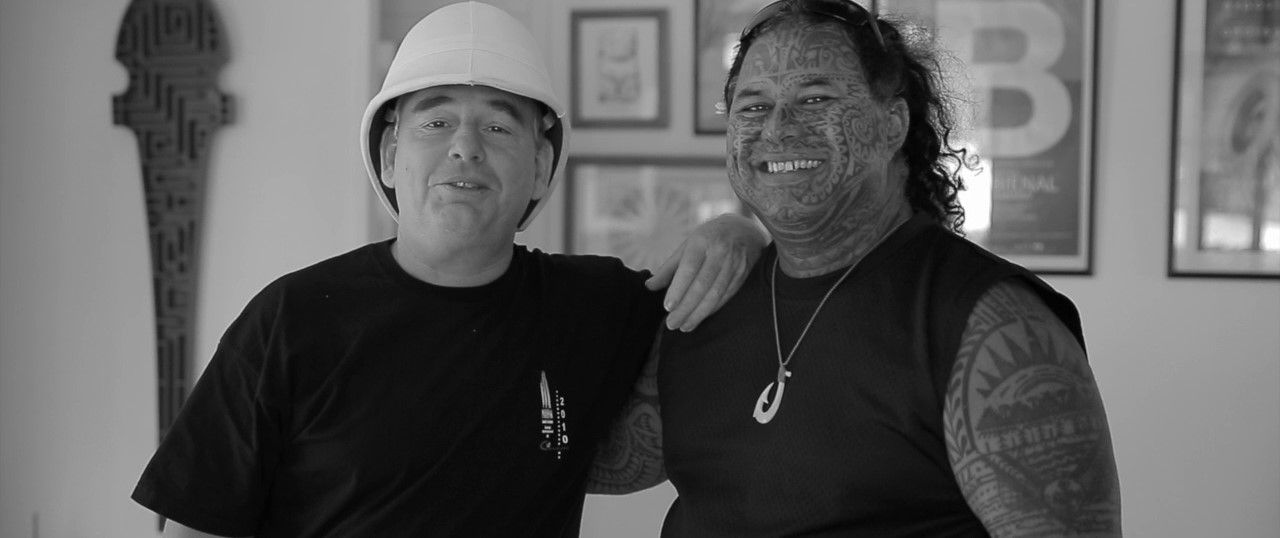
Andreas Dettloff and Chief Miko in the documentary Moko le chef voyant

Andreas Dettloff (born 26 October 1963) is a German visual artist who lives and works in Tahiti. He is one of the most influential artists in French Polynesia.

== Biography ==
Dettloff was born in Iserlohn in Germany and educated at the Kunstakademie Düsseldorf. He was awarded a scholarship allowing him to travel to Australia, Easter Island and Polynesia. In 1989 he settled permanently in Tahiti.

Dettloff uses traditional Polynesian symbols, which he mixes with those of the western world. He was probably the first artist to introduce sometimes conceptual art into Polynesia.

== Exhibitions ==
- Winkler gallery (2014)
- Moruroa forever, Winkler gallery (2016)
- Mata Hoata, Musée du Quai Branly – Jacques Chirac (2016)
- Objets du Fenua, Lycée Hôtelier (2018)
