= Coco Hotahota =

French Polynesian dancer (1941–2020)

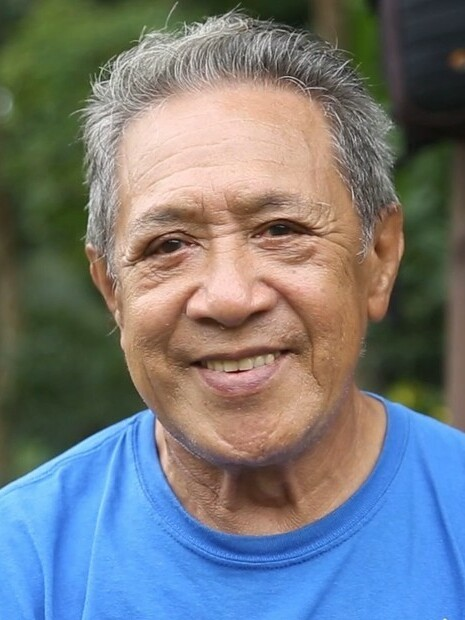
- Born: Jean Hotahota; 1 January 1941; Moorea-Maiao, France
- Died: 8 March 2020 (aged 79); Pirae, French Polynesia
- Occupation(s): Dancer; Choreographer

Coco Hotahota (1 January 1941 — 8 March 2020) was a French Polynesian dancer and choreographer who founded the Temaeva troupe in 1962. He greatly contributed to choreography for the dance ’Ori tahiti.

== Videography ==
- Coco Hotahota Te Maeva (2019)
