= Jean Guiart =

French anthropologist and ethnologist

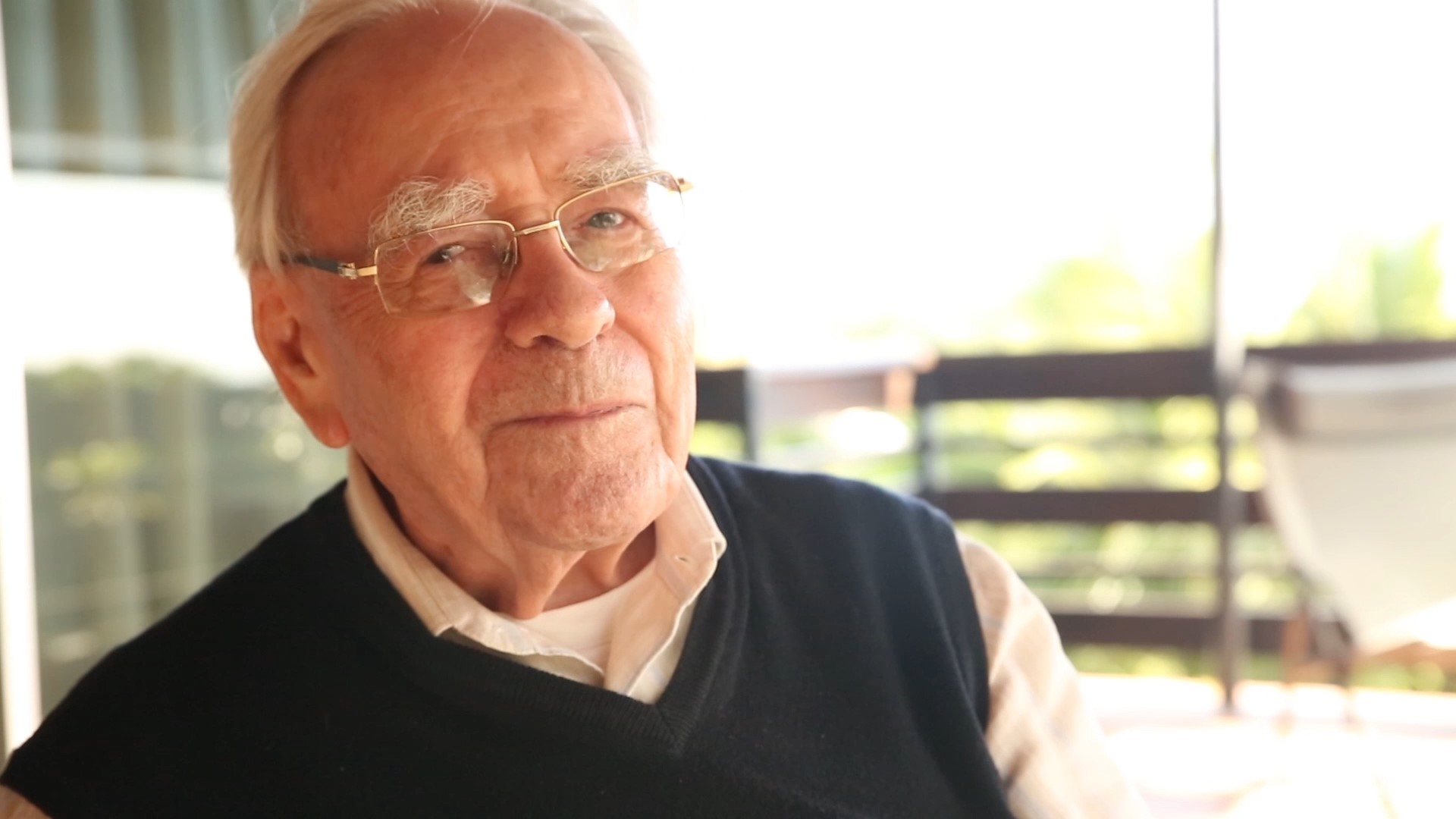
Jean Guiart at his home in Punaauia in 2018

Jean Guiart (22 July 1924 - 4 August 2019) was a French anthropologist and ethnologist specializing in Melanesia. From 1972 to 1982 he was president of the Société des Océanistes.

== Background ==
Guiart was born in Lyon to a long line of doctors and medical researchers. He was the son of the parasitologist Jules Guiart. He initially studied at the Protestant Faculty of Theology in Paris, before switching to study ethnology at the École pratique des hautes études (EPHE). Age 15 when WWII started, he played a small role in the French Resistance. In 1944 after World War II he was employed by the Musée de l'Homme to help inventory its collection. In 1945 he joined the Société des Océanistes. In 1947 he graduated with a diploma in Oceanic languages from the École nationale des langues orientales vivantes and moved to New Caledonia to work for the French Institute of Oceania. He completed a diploma in colonial ethnology from the Research Institute for Development and then did fieldwork in the New Hebrides (modern Vanuatu). He held the French equivalent of a PhD and mid-career Habilitation, both for work in Vanuatu.

== Career ==
His research interests were the arts and religions of Oceania, particularly New Caledonia and Vanuatu. From 1968 to 1973 he was director of studies at the EPHE, and then from 1973 to 1988 director of the ethnology laboratory at the Musée de l'Homme in Paris, a position offering latitude to conduct fieldwork and research. From 1972 to 1982 he was president of the Société des Océanistes, and served as its vice-president from 1961 to 1971 and from 1982 to 1995.

After retiring he lived in the Pacific, first in Nouméa, where his wife's house was burned down by French or Caledonien nationalists because of his support for New Caledonia's independence from France, and then in Punaauia in French Polynesia where he also supported independence and continued extensive writing on Pacific affairs and culture.

He founded the publishing companies Le Rocher-à-la-Voile in New Caledonia and Te Pito O Te Fenua in French Polynesia, as well as the magazine Connexions.

== Death ==
He died in Punaauia on 4 August 2019, age 94. His wife, Joséphine Pawé Wahnyamala, predeceased him in 2012. They had two sons, Armand and René.

== Major works ==
Guiart published around 44 books, if novels and autobiographical accounts are included, latterly with his own book imprints. His strong ethnographic contributions on Vanuatu gave way in later life, critics say, to blistering critiques of the work of fellow anthropologists working in the Pacific, as well as the colonial French regime.

- Un siècle et demi de contacts culturels à Tanna, Nouvelles-Hébrides, ORSTOM & Publications de la Société des Océanistes No. 5, Paris, 1956,
- Espiritu Santo, Plon, L’Homme, Cahiers d’Ethnologie, de Géographie et de Linguistique n¨2, Paris, 1958.
- Les Religions de l’Océanie, Presses universitaires de France, Paris, 1962.
- Structure de la chefferie en Mélanésie du Sud, Institut d’Ethnologie de l’Université de Paris, Paris, 1963.
- Océanie, L’Univers des Formes, Gallimard, Paris, 1963.
- La Mythologie du Masque en Nouvelle-Calédonie, Publications de la Société des Océanistes No. 18, Paris.
- Clefs pour l’ethnologie, Seghers, Paris, 1971, 268 p., 17 fig., 4 tableaux,
- Jullien, Charles André & Guiart, Jean, Histoire de l’Océanie, Encyclopédie : Que Sais-je?, Presses universitaires de France, Paris, 1971,
- Espirat, Jean-Jacques; Guiart, J.; Lagrange, Marie-Salomé & Renaud, Monique, Système des titres dans les Nouvelles Hébrides Centrales, d’Efate aux Iles Shepherds, Institut d’Ethnologie, Paris, 1973,
- (in German) Ozeanien, Kunst der Naturvölker, Propyläen Kunstgeschichte, édité par Elsy Leuzinger, Propyläen Verlag, Berlin 1978,
- La Terre est le Sang des Morts, Éditions Anthropos, Paris, 1983,
- Structure de la Chefferie en Mélanésie du Sud, Institut d’Ethnologie, Paris, 1992 2^{e} édition rewritten
- Bwesou Eurijisi.Le premier écrivain canaque, Le Rocher-à-la-Voile, Nouméa, 1998, reedited.
- Les Canaques devant l’économie de marché, Le Rocher-à-la-Voile, Nouméa, 1998, reedited.
- Autour du rocher d’Até. Les effets de la résistance canaque sur l’axe Koné-Tiwaka, Le Rocher-à-la-Voile, Nouméa, 1998,
- Heurs et malheurs du pays de Numea, ou le péché originel, Le Rocher-à-la-Voile, Nouméa, 1999,
- Découverte de l’Océanie.I.Connaissance des îles, Le Rocher -à-la-Voile, Nouméa, 2000, en coédition avec les éditions Haere Po.
- Sociétés mélanésiennes : Idées fausses, idées vraies, Le Rocher-à-la-Voile, Nouméa, 2001.
- Et le masque sortit de la mer, Les pays canaques anciens, de Hienghène à Voh, Gomèn et Koumac, Le Rocher-à-la-Voile, Nouméa, 2002.
- J.Guiart (présentés par), Les Cahiers de Théodore Braïno Kaahwa, Le Rocher-à-la-Voile, Nouméa, 2002,
- Découverte de l’Océanie II.Connaissance des Hommes, Le Rocher-à-la-Voile, Nouméa, 2003, 362 p. (en coédition avec les éditions Haere Po)
- Maurice Leenhardt, le lien d'un homme avec un peuple qui ne voulait pas mourir, Le Rocher-à-la̠-Voile, Nouméa, 2003,
- Ça plait ou ça ne plait pas, Éléments de bibliographie critique - I, Le Rocher-à-la-Voile, Nouméa, 2004,
- Ça plait ou ça ne plait pas, Éléments de bibliographie critique - II, Le Rocher-à-la-Voile, Nouméa, 2004,
- L’enfer expatrié, Réflexion sur la guerre dans le Pacifique Sud (1941-1945), Le Rocher-à-la-Voile et les Éditions du Cagou, Nouméa, 2005,
- Les réseaux d’identification partagée, une clé de la société canaque, Le Rocher-à-la-Voile et les Éditions du Cagou, Nouméa, 2005,
- Mon Dieu là haut, la tête en bas! Introduction à la connaissance des cultures océaniennes, I. Les pionniers, Le Rocher-à-la-Voile et les Éditions du Cagou, Nouméa, 2006a.
- Variations sur les Arts Premiers I. La manipulation, Le Rocher-à-la-Voile, Nouméa, 2006b.
- Mon Dieu là haut, la tête en bas.L’Ethnologie dans le Pacifique I.Les Anciens, Le Rocher-à-la-Voile et les Éditions Haere Po no Tahiti, Nouméa et Pape’et, 2006c.
- La Terre qui s’enfuit. Les pays canaques anciens de La Foa à Kouaoua, Moindou et Bourail, Le Rocher-à-la-Voile, Nouméa, 2010.
- Ça plait ou ça ne plait pas, Éléments de bibliographie critique - III, Le Rocher-à-la-Voile, Nouméa, 2010.
- Jules Calimbre, Chronique de trois femmes et de trois maisons, Le Rocher-à-la-Voile et les Éditions du Cagou, Nouméa, 2010, re-edited.
- Adieu Calédonie, ou le jeu de go d’un colonel kanak, Novel. Le Rocher-à-la-Voile, Nouméa, 2011.
- On a perdu, une perle noire et deux cadavres, Novel. Le Rocher-à-la-Voile, Nouméa et Papeete, 2011.
- Malekula, l’explosion culturelle, Le Rocher-à-la-Voile, Nouméa et Papeete, 2011.
- Return to Paradise. Les dossiers oubliés: le fardeau de l'homme blanc, Le Rocher-à-la-Voile, Nouméa, 2011.
- Un royaume canaque dans les nuages, La Tierra Austrialia del Espiritu Santo, Le Rocher à la Voile, Nouméa et Pape'ete, 2012.
- Agir à contre-emploi (Chronique d'une vie en zigzags), Le Rocher à la Voile, Nouméa et Pape'ete, 2013.
- Précis de la méthode en anthropologie social
- Bêtisier Océanien: Ce qu’il faut savoir de l’Océanie et dictionnaire des erreurs accumulées. Le Rocher-à-la-Voile 2013.
