= Tahiti Nui Television =

Tahiti Nui TV (French: Tahiti Nui Télévision), abbreviated as TNTV, is a French Polynesian television channel. It was launched on 29 June 2000; 25 years ago and is in both the French and Tahitian languages.

== Programming ==
See: List of programs broadcast by Tahiti Nui Television

TNTV airs three news providing TV shows, Te ve'a, The Journal and Manihini.

== See also ==
- List of programs broadcast by Tahiti Nui Television
