= List of people from Brooklyn =

This is a list of people who were either born or have lived in Brooklyn, a borough of New York City at some time in their lives.

== A ==
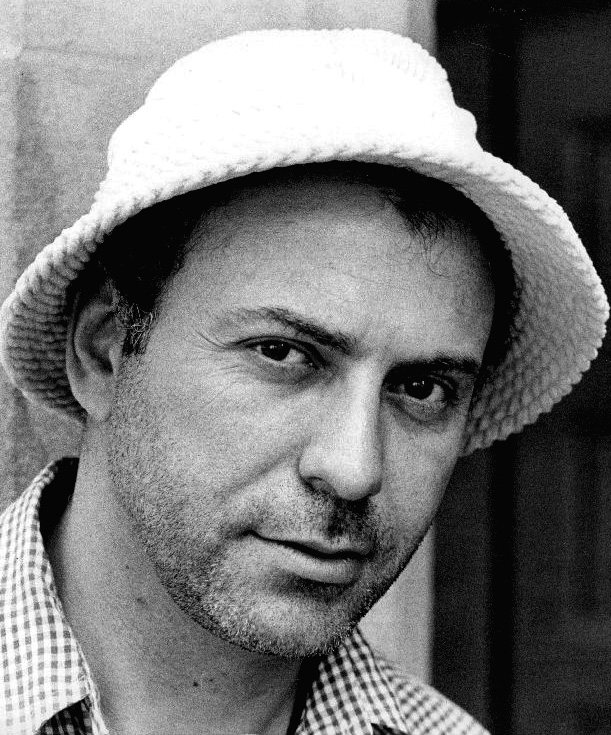
Alan Arkin

- Aaliyah (1979–2001) – actress, dancer and singer
- Allison Abbate (born 1965) – film producer and animator
- Johari Abdul-Malik – imam and Muslim activist
- Cal Abrams (1924–1997) – Major League Baseball player (Madison)
- Elaine Abrams – physician and epidemiologist
- Elizabeth C. Addoms (1905–1983) – physical therapist and academic
- Constance Ahrons (1937–2021) – psychotherapist
- Aja (born 1994) – rapper, drag queen, and reality television personality
- Monica Aksamit (born 1990), saber fencer; won a bronze medal at the 2016 Summer Olympics in the women's saber team competition
- Romeo Alaeff (born 1970) – visual artist
- Michael Alaimo (1938–2025) – actor
- Sal Albanese (born 1949) – politician
- Marv Albert (born 1941) – sportscaster (Manhattan Beach)
- Steve Albert (born 1952) – sportscaster
- Tatyana Ali (born 1979) – actress
- Rawle Alkins (born 1997) – basketball player in the NBA and Israeli Basketball Premier League
- Donna Allegra (1953–2020) – writer and dancer
- Alexander Allen – stylist
- Harry Allen (born 1963) – journalist
- Woody Allen (born 1935) – film director, actor and screenwriter (Midwood)
- Louis Allmendinger (1878–1937) – architect
- Dean Alvord (1856–1941) – real estate developer
- Lyle Alzado (1949–1992) – NFL All-Pro football player
- Franco Ambriz – playwright
- Anthony Ameruso (1937–2006) – New York City transportation commissioner
- Alan Amron (born 1948) – inventor
- John Andariese (1938–2017) – basketball player and sports broadcaster
- Barbara Anderson (born 1945) – actress
- Dave Anderson (1929–2018) – sportswriter
- Warren Anderson (1921–2014) – businessman and CEO of Union Carbide Corporation at the time of the Bhopal disaster
- Grace Andrews (1869–1951) – mathematician
- Carmelo Anthony (born 1984) – National Basketball Association player (Red Hook)
- Stephen Antonakos (1926–2013) – sculptor
- Sonny Arguinzoni (1939–2025) – evangelist and Christian religious leader
- Alan Arkin (1934–2023) – actor, director and screenwriter
- Jack Armstrong (born 1963) – sportscaster Toronto Raptors; former coach Niagara University
- Darren Aronofsky (born 1969) – film director
- Abraham Aronow (born 1940) – physician and photographer
- Robert Asencio (born 1963) – Florida politician
- Isaac Asimov (1920–1992) – author and biochemist
- Stan Asofsky (1937–2024) – superfan of the New York Knicks
- Madeline Astor (1893–1970) – Titanic survivor, wife of John Jacob Astor IV
- W.H. Auden (1907–1973) – poet
- Red Auerbach (1917–2006) – National Basketball Association coach and general manager, member of Hall of Fame (Williamsburg)
- Aaron Augenblick (born 1975) – animator, director, and producer
- Ken Auletta (born 1942) – journalist and writer
- Louis Auslander (1928–1997) – mathematician
- Maurice Auslander (1926–1994) – mathematician
- Paul Auster (1947–2024) – author (Park Slope)
- Albert S. Axelrad (born 1938) – rabbi, author, educator, and community leader
- Martin Azarow (1934–2003) – actor

== B ==
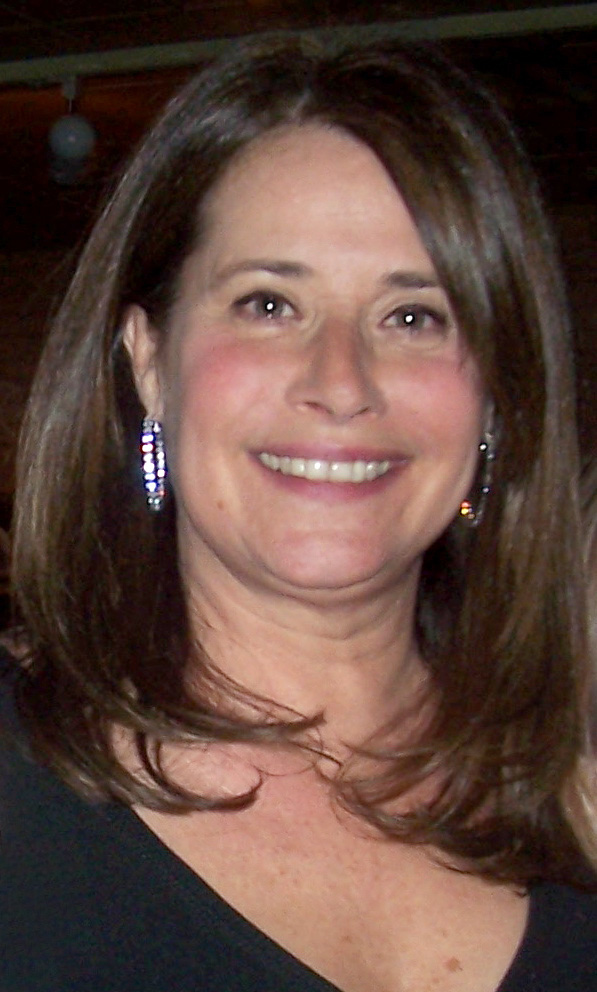
Lorraine Bracco

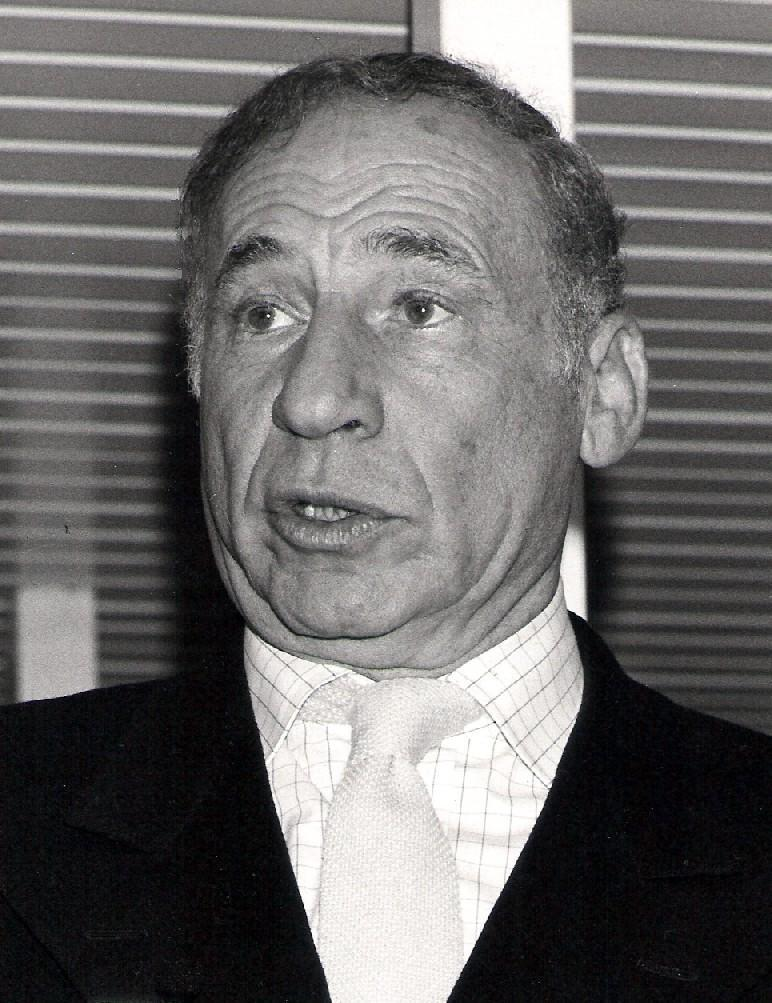
Mel Brooks

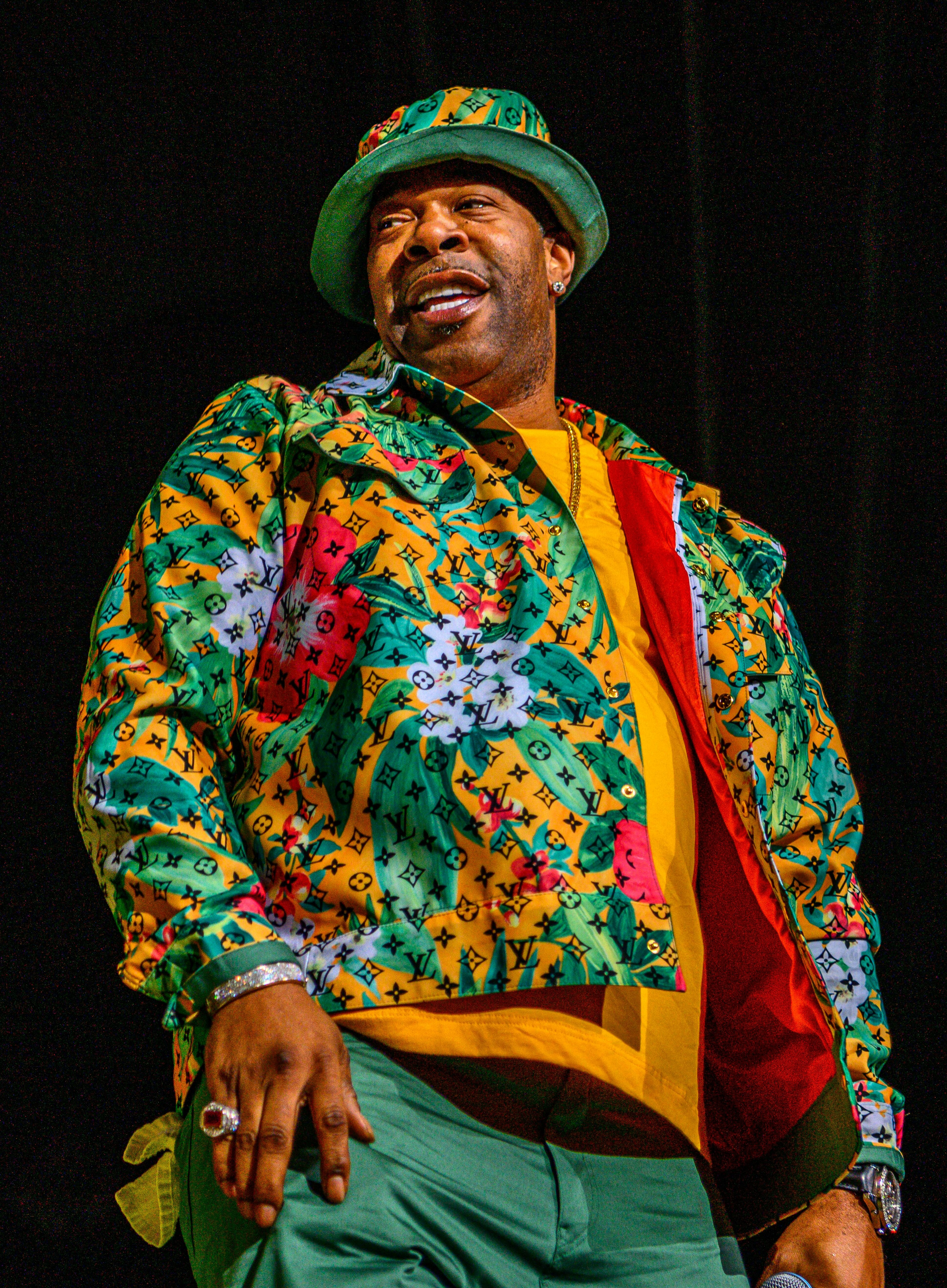
Busta Rhymes

- John Badalamenti (born 1973) – federal judge (Gravesend)
- Joey Badass (born 1995) – rapper
- Jenny Baglivo (born 1948) – mathematician, statistician, and author
- Adrienne Bailon (born 1983) – actress
- Scott Baio (born 1960) – actor (Dyker Heights)
- William Baker (1866–1930) – New York City police commissioner and owner of the Philadelphia Phillies
- Ralph Bakshi (born 1938) – film director (Haifa, Israel–born and Brownsville-reared)
- Folarin Balogun (born 2001) – soccer player
- Jean Balukas (born 1959) – pool player
- Francis J. Banfield (1827–1883) – soldier, law enforcement officer, and police sergeant
- Ross Barkan (born 1989) – journalist, novelist, and essayist
- Aziza Barnes (1992–2024) – poet, screenwriter and playwright
- Samuel Baron (1925–1997) – flutist
- Salvatore Barone (born 1995) – soccer player
- Carolyne Barry (1943–2015) – dancer and dance instructor
- Pauline Bart (1930–2021) – sociologist
- Maria Bartiromo (born 1967) – journalist and author
- Jake Barton (born 1972) – designer
- Jean-Michel Basquiat (1960–1988) – artist
- Ebenezer Bassett (1833–1908) – diplomat
- Noah Baumbach (born 1969) – film director and writer (Midwood)
- Frederick Converse Beach (1848–1918) – patent attorney, editor and co-owner of Scientific American
- Gary Becker (1930–2014) – economist; Nobel Memorial Prize in Economic Sciences (1992) (Madison)
- Francis J. Beckwith (born 1960) – philosopher at Baylor University
- James D. M. Beebe (1827–1917) – Sandy Hook Pilot
- Edward Beecher (1803–1895) – theologian
- Henry Ward Beecher (1813–1887) – clergyman and social reformer
- Lyman Beecher (1775–1863) – clergyman and father of Henry Ward Beecher, Thomas K. Beecher and Harriet Beecher Stowe
- Begushkin – folk rock band
- Joy Behar (born 1942) – comedian and talk-show host (Williamsburg)
- Sam Belnavis (1939–2021) – executive in automobile racing
- Paul Ben-Victor (born 1965) – actor (Midwood)
- Pat Benatar (born 1953) – singer (Greenpoint)
- Richard Bender (1930–2022) – architect and urban planner
- Randy E. Bennett – educational researcher (Flatbush)
- Mary Crowell Van Benschoten (1840–1921), author, newspaper publisher, clubwoman
- Sarah Benson – director of avant-garde theatre
- Bill Benulis (1928–2011) – penciller and inker
- John G. Bergen (1814–1867) – public servant and New York City Police Commissioner
- David Berkowitz (born 1953) – serial killer known as "Son of Sam"
- Joan Berkowitz (1931–2020) – chemist
- A. R. Bernard (born 1953) – pastor and founder of the Christian Cultural Center
- Walter Berndt (1899–1979) – cartoonist
- Hannah Berner (born 1991) – comedian
- Mike Berniker (1935–2008) – record producer
- Karen Bernod (born 1964) – R&B vocalist, songwriter and producer
- Herb Bernstein – record producer, composer, arranger, and conductor
- Lou Bernstein (1911–2005) – photographer and teacher
- Mark S. Berry – music and film producer
- Alan Bersin (born 1946) – civil servant, lawyer, scholar, and educator
- Paul Bettany (born 1971) – actor (Brooklyn Heights)
- Miriam Bienstock (1923–2015) – record company executive
- Jennifer Biesty – chef and restaurateur
- Big Daddy Kane – rapper, producer and actor
- Sidney W. Bijou (1908–2009) – developmental psychologist
- Paul Binder (born 1942) – founder and ringmaster of the Big Apple Circus
- J. Malcolm Bird (1886–1964) – mathematician and parapsychologist
- Howard Kent Birnbaum (1932–2005) – metallurgist
- Charles Biro (1911–1972) – cartoonist and comic book creator
- Alexis Bittar – jewelry designer
- Mary Walling Blackburn (born 1972) – artist, writer, and feminist
- Brandon Blackwood – fashion designer and businessman
- Larry J. Blake (1914–1982) – actor
- Lloyd Blankfein (born 1954) – investment banker; chief executive officer of Goldman Sachs
- Herbert Blau (1926–2013) – theatre director and educator
- Corbin Bleu (born 1989) – actor
- Paul Bloch (1939–2018) – publicist
- Walter Block (born 1941) – economist and anarcho-capitalist theorist
- Sara Blomqvist (born 1989) – fashion model
- George G. Bloomer (born 1963) – televangelist
- Kermit Bloomgarden (1904–1976) – theatrical producer
- William Bodde Jr. (1931–2020) – diplomat
- Joseph Bologna (1934–2017) – actor
- Kurt Boone (born 1959) – writer
- Bob Born (1924–2023) – inventor of Peeps marshmallow confection
- John Boulos (1921–2002) – soccer player and National Soccer Hall of Fame inductee
- Matthew Bouraee (born 1988) – soccer player
- William Oland Bourne (1819–1901) – clergyman, publisher, journalist, editor, author, poet, and social reformer
- Clara Bow (1905–1965) – actress (Prospect Heights)
- Riddick Bowe (born 1967) – boxer, heavyweight champion (Brownsville)
- Doug Bowser (born 1965) – president of Nintendo of America
- Barbara Boxer (born 1940) – politician; U.S. senator from California (1993–2017)
- Harry Boykoff (1922–2001) – basketball player
- Elizabeth Bracco (born 1957) – actress
- Lorraine Bracco (born 1954) – actress
- Steve Bracey (1950–2006) – basketball player
- Scott Brady (1924–1985) – actor
- Justin Brannan (born 1978) – politician and musician
- Maureen Braziel (born 1945) – pioneer of women's judo competition
- George Braziller (1916–2017) – book publisher
- Mark Breland (born 1963) – boxer; five-time New York Golden Gloves champion
- Julia E. B. Brick (1819–1902) – philanthropist
- Shannon Briggs (born 1971) – boxer, heavyweight champion
- Richard Bright (1937–2006) – actor
- Alice Brock (1941–2024) – artist, author and restaurateur
- Stanley Brock (1931–1991) – actor
- Gail Brodsky (born 1991) – tennis player
- Lola Brooke (born 1994) – rapper
- Mel Brooks (born 1926) – actor, comedian, film director, film producer and screenwriter (Williamsburg)
- Brooklyn Thrill Killers – Four Brooklyn teenagers who were convicted of murdering a homeless man in 1954
- Dario Brose (born 1970) – soccer player and 1992 Olympian
- Foxy Brown (born 1978) – actress, model and rap artist (Park Slope)
- Larry Brown (born 1940) – basketball player and coach, point guard, three-time All-Star, three-time assists leader, Olympic champion, NCAA and NBA head coach
- Nixzmary Brown (1998–2006) – murder victim
- Patrick J. Brown (1952–2001) – fire captain who died in the September 11 attacks who is the subject of the 2006 film Finding Paddy
- Peter Campbell Brown (1913–1994) – lawyer and government official
- Richard Brown (1810–1885) – Sandy Hook Pilot
- Dave Buchwald (born 1970) – filmmaker and hacker
- Elliott Buckmaster (1889–1976) – U.S. Navy officer; naval aviator during World War I and World War II
- Buckshot (born 1974) – rapper (Crown Heights)
- Eddie Buczynski (1947–1989) – Wiccan and archaeologist
- Oral Bullen (born 1983) – soccer player
- Nicholas Burke (born 1837) – uilleann piper
- Kit Burns (1831–1870) – sportsman, saloon keeper and criminal
- Sarah Burns – writer, public speaker, and filmmaker
- Terry Burrus – musician; composer, conductor, producer
- Steve Buscemi (born 1957) – actor, film director and screenwriter
- Arnold H. Buss – psychologist and academic
- Daniel M. Burnham (1929–2020) – politician
- Busta Rhymes (born 1972) – rapper (East Flatbush and Bedford–Stuyvesant)
- Yitzhak Buxbaum (died 2020) – author and maggid

== C ==
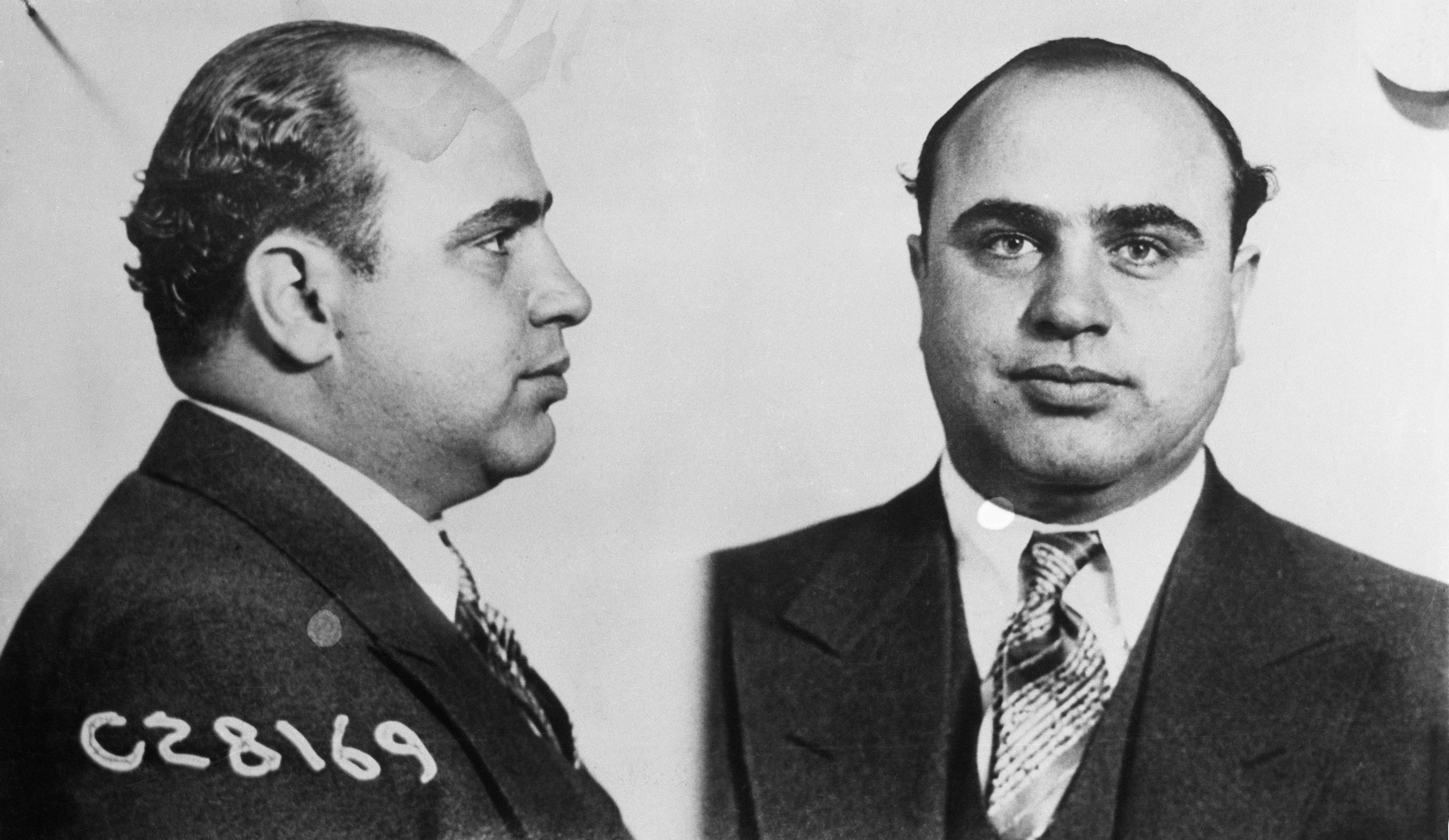
Al Capone

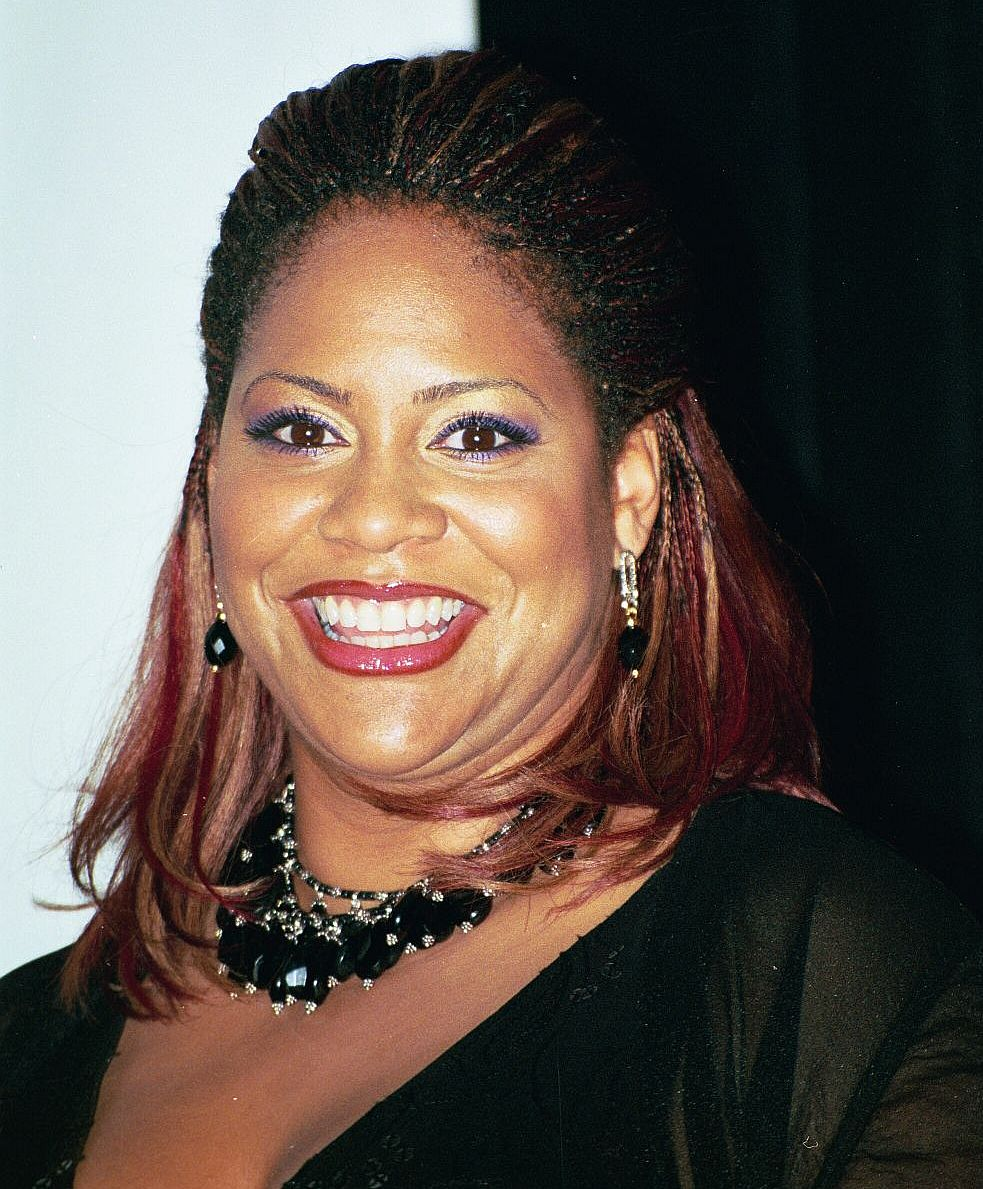
Kim Coles

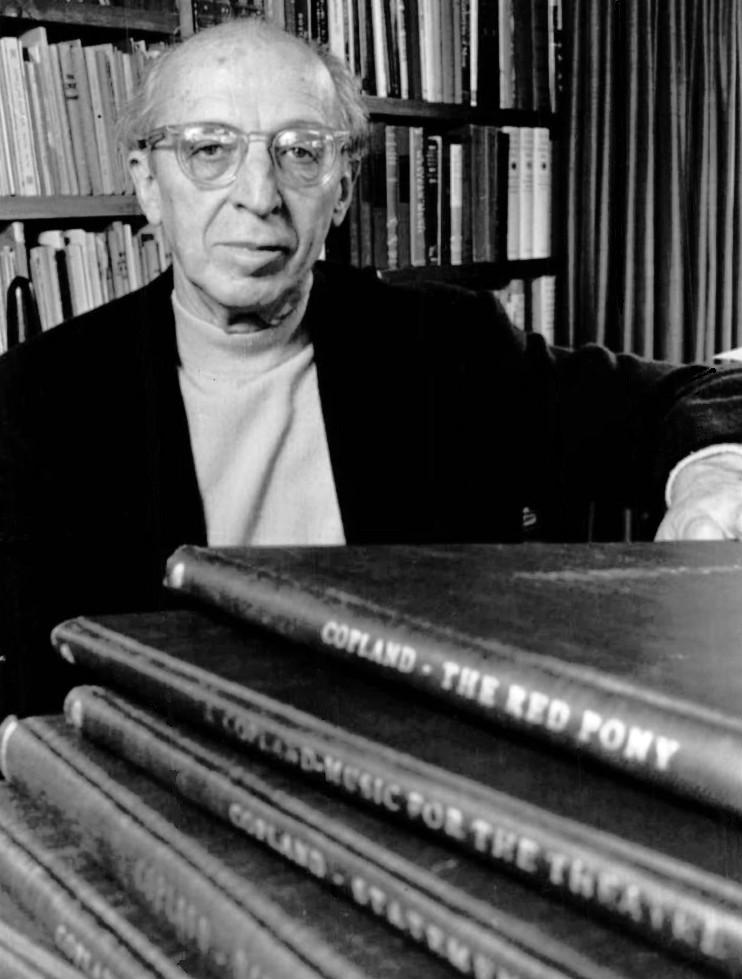
Aaron Copland

- Red Cafe (born 1976) – rapper (Flatbush)
- Jason Calacanis (born 1970) – podcaster and author
- Paul Calello (1961–2010) – CEO of Credit Suisse Group
- Charlie Callas (1927–2011) – comedian
- Brandon Cambridge (born 2002) – soccer player
- Robert Horton Cameron (1908–1989) – mathematician known for the Cameron–Martin theorem
- Sean Cameron (born 1985) – soccer player who represented Guyana
- Duncan Candler (1873–1949) – architect
- Mathilda B. Canter (1924–2015) – psychologist
- Giovanni Capitello (born 1979) – actor/filmmaker
- Al Capone (1899–1947) – gangster (Red Hook)
- Mae Capone (1897–1986) – wife of Al Capone
- Fred Capossela (1902–1991) – thoroughbred race track announcer
- Truman Capote (1924–1984) – writer (Brooklyn Heights)
- Miriam Carey (1979–2013) – woman killed at a White House security check point
- Timothy Carey (1929–1994) – film and television character actor
- Jack Carter (1922–2015) – comedian
- Fabiano Caruana (born 1992) – youngest chess grandmaster in United States history (Park Slope)
- Lionel Casson (1914–2009) – classical archaeologist
- Vito J. Castellano (1925–2019) – Adjutant General of New York
- Jack Catran (1918–2001) – industrial designer and linguist (Bensonhurst)
- Chris Cattaneo (born 1957) – soccer player
- Gerald Chapman (1887–1926) – criminal known as the "Gentleman Bandit"
- George S. Chase (1909–1972) – composer
- Roz Chast (born 1954) – cartoonist
- Joy Chatel (1947–2014) – cosmetologist, community organizer and activist
- Edwin Checkley (1847–1925) – athlete, author, and physician
- Phyllis Chesler (born 1940) – writer, psychotherapist, and academic
- Bea Chester – All-American Girls Professional Baseball League player
- Hilda Chester (1897–1978) – Brooklyn Dodgers super fan known as Howlin' Hilda
- Sheila Cherfilus-McCormick (born 1979) – U.S. representative for Florida
- Nola Chilton (1922–2021) – theater director and acting teacher
- Shirley Chisholm (1924–2005) – first female African American U.S. representative and first African American major-party candidate for U.S. president
- Alice Clark (c. 1947–2004) – singer
- Donald C. Clark Sr. (1931–2020) – businessman and philanthropist
- Adele Clarke (1945–2024) – sociologist and women's health scholar
- Yvette Clarke (born 1964) – U.S. congresswoman and former New York City councilor
- Andrew Dice Clay (born 1957) – comedian (Sheepshead Bay)
- Cheryl "Coko" Clemons (born 1970) – gospel singer and lead singer of R&B group SWV
- Abram Cohen (1924–2016) – Olympic fencer
- David Cohen (1917–2020) – member of the US Army, a liberator of the Ohrdruf concentration camp, and schoolteacher
- George H. Cohen – lawyer
- Haylynn Cohen (born 1980) – model
- Herbert Cohen (born 1940) – 2x Olympic foil fencer
- Irwin Cohen (developer) (1933–2023) – lawyer, investor, and real estate developer
- Karl P. Cohen (1913–2012) – physical chemist and mathematical physicist who helped usher in the age of nuclear energy and reactor development
- Manuel F. Cohen (1912–1977) – chairman of the U.S. Securities and Exchange Commission
- Gary Cohn (1952–2024) – journalist
- Joanne M. Cohoon (died 2016) – sociologist
- Kenneth Cole – designer
- Norm Coleman (born 1949) – U.S. senator from Minnesota, 2003–2009 (Madison)
- Kim Coles (born 1962) – comedian, actress from Living Single
- Melville Collins (1878–1924) – actor, baritone, composer, and pianist
- Sandy Collora (born 1968) – film director
- Joseph Colombo (1923 –1978) – mobster who was boss of the Colombo crime family
- Elvis Comrie (born 1959) – soccer player who represented the United States national team
- Robert W. Conn (born 1942) – president and chief executive officer of The Kavli Foundation
- Jennifer Connelly (born 1970) – actress (Brooklyn Heights)
- Chuck Connors (1921–1992) – actor
- Daniel Conover (1822–1896) – public servant, political activist, and industrialist
- Mildred Constantine (1913–2008) – curator
- Omar Cook (born 1982) – professional basketball player
- Andrew W. Cooper (1927–2002) – civil rights activist, businessman, and journalist
- George H. Cooper (1821–1891) – United States Navy rear admiral
- Pat Cooper (1929–2023) – comedian (Red Hook)
- Aaron Copland (1900–1990) – composer
- Italia Coppola (1912–2004) – matriarch of the Coppola family
- Larry Corcoran (1859–1891) – Major League Baseball player
- John Corigliano (born 1938) – Academy Award-, Pulitzer Prize for Music- and Grammy Award-winning composer (Midwood)
- William H. Cornwell (1843–1903) – businessman, military colonel and politician
- Howard Cosell (1918–1995) – sportscaster
- William R. Cosentini – mechanical engineer and founder of Cosentini Associates
- Jonathan Coulton (born 1970) – musician
- Almira Kennedy Coursey (1914–1996) – activist and educator
- Jesse Armour Crandall (1834–1920) – inventor and toy-maker
- Hart Crane (1899–1932) – poet (The Bridge)
- Melora Creager (born 1966) – singer
- Jimmy Crespo (born 1954) – former Aerosmith guitarist
- Peter Criss (born 1945) – musician
- Seymour L. Cromwell (1871–1925) – banker who served as president of the New York Stock Exchange
- Billy Cunningham (born 1942) – NBA player and coach
- Duncan Curry (1812–1894) – baseball pioneer and insurance executive
- Steve Cuozzo (born 1950) – newspaper editor, restaurant critic, and real estate columnist
- Anthony Curtiss (1910–1981) – naturalist and writer
- Malkia Cyril (born 1974) – poet and media activist

== D ==
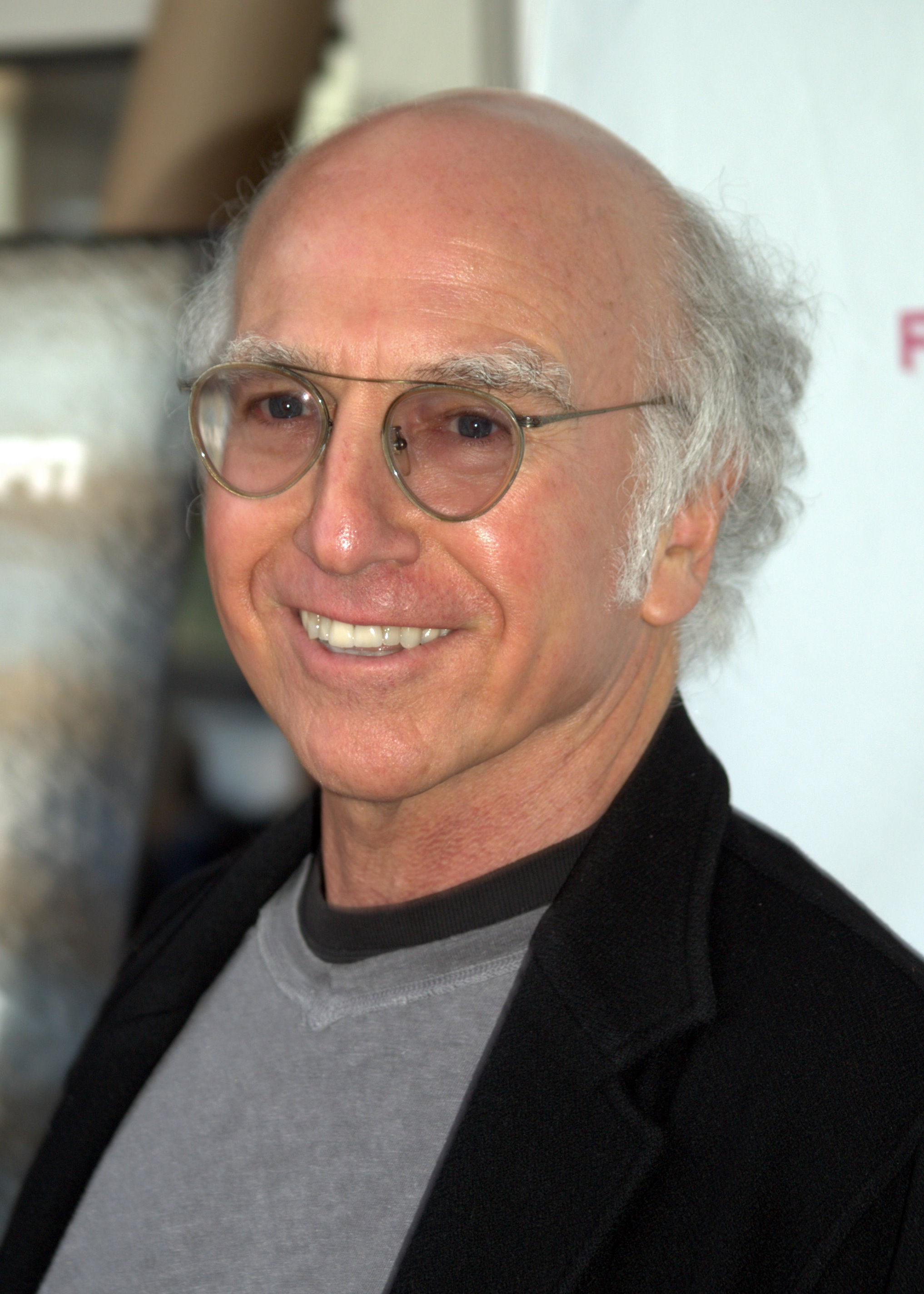
Larry David

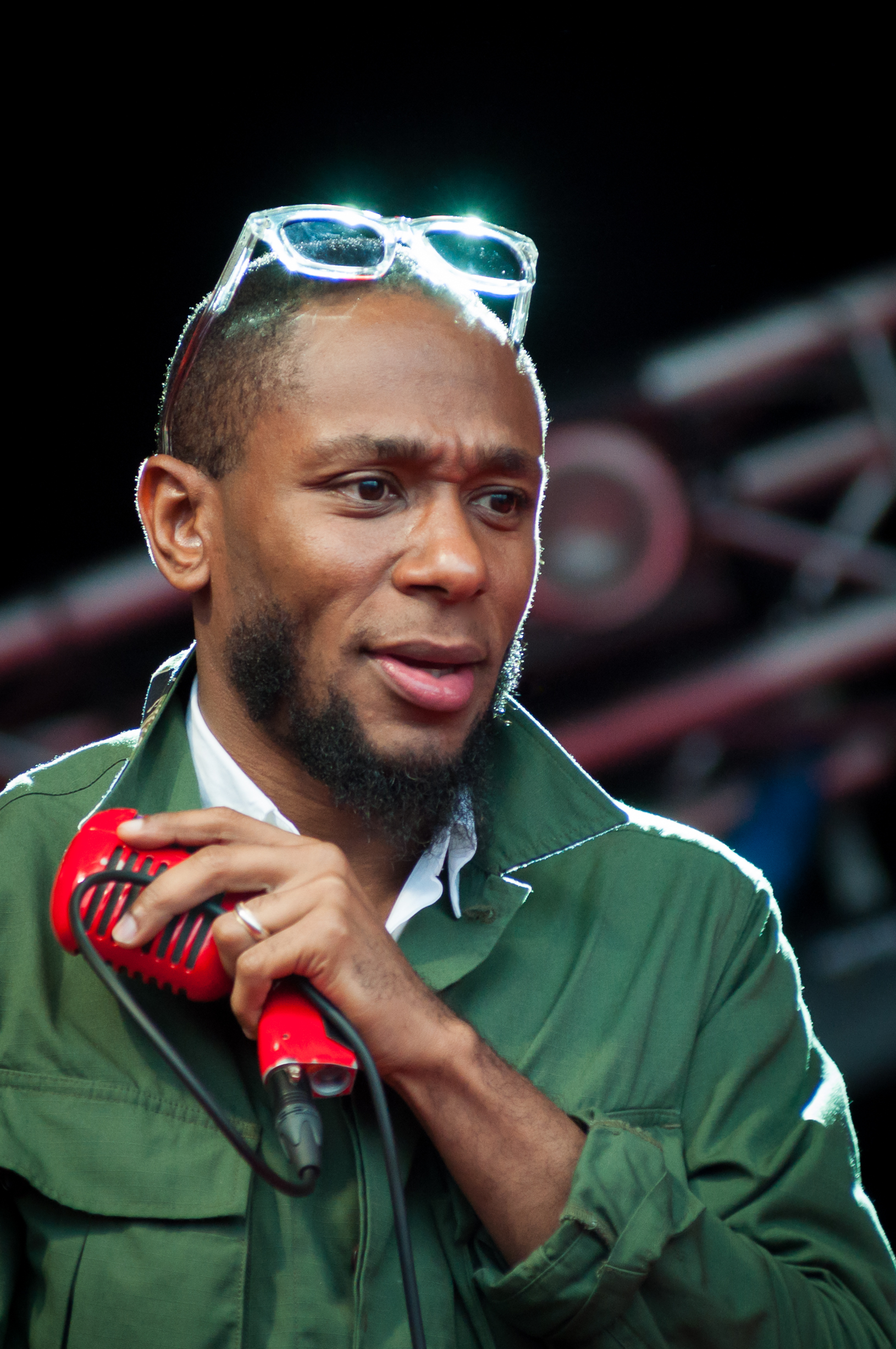
Mos Def

- Da Beatminerz – hip-hop production team
- Da Bush Babees – hip-hop group (Flatbush)
- Andrea Dalzell – nurse
- Dana Dane (born 1965) – rapper (Fort Greene)
- Tony Danza (born 1951) – actor
- John D'Aquino (born 1958) – actor
- Thomas Darden (1900–1961) – U.S. Navy rear admiral, 37th governor of American Samoa
- Jonathan David (born 2000) – soccer player who represented the Canada soccer team
- Larry David (born 1947) – writer, producer, actor, and comedian (Sheepshead Bay)
- Brian David-Marshall (born 1967) – founding partner of Eternity Comics
- Paul Davidson (1930–2024) – economist
- Richard Davidson (born 1951) – psychologist
- Edward H. Davis (1862–1951) – field collector for the Museum of the American Indian
- James E. Davis (1962–2003) – politician who was assassinated
- John Henry Davis (1921–1984) – U.S. weightlifter, 6-time world champion and 2-time Olympic gold medalist
- Luther Davis (1916–2008) – playwright and screenwriter
- Marguerite Inman Davis (1870–1963) – socialite, nurse and political figure
- Tommy Davis – baseball player and coach
- Noach Dear (1953–2020) – New York Supreme Court judge
- Frank DeCicco (1935–1986) – mobster
- Mos Def (born 1973) – actor and rapper (Bedford–Stuyvesant)
- Ronald DeFeo Jr. (1951–2021) – mass murderer who killed his family in 1974; inspiration for The Amityville Horror
- Calvert DeForest (1921–2007) – actor and comedian
- Sebastian DeFrancesco (1953–2023), paralympic athlete and table tennis player
- Charles R. DeFreest (1852–1901) – journalist, newspaper editor, and politician
- David DeJesus (born 1979) – MLB player
- Jane Delgado (born 1953) – clinical psychologist, health care advocate, non-profit executive, and author
- Dom DeLuise (1933–2009) – comedian and actor
- Tony De Nonno (born 1947) – filmmaker, photographer, puppeteer, and historian
- Alan Dershowitz (born 1938) – lawyer, professor, author (Williamsburg)
- C.C. Deville (Bruce Johannesson) (born 1962) – guitarist for the bands Poison and Samantha 7
- Kevin Devine (born 1979) – musician
- Danny Devito (born 1944) – actor, comedian, filmmaker
- Neil Diamond (born 1941) – singer
- Lou DiBella – boxing promoter and television/film producer
- Sally Maria Diggs (died 1928) – enslaved African-American girl whose freedom was famously bought by Henry Ward Beecher
- Mary E. Dillon (1886–1983) – engineer and president of Brooklyn Borough Gas Company
- Jessica Dimmock (born 1978) – documentary photojournalist
- Lou DiMuro (1931–1982) – umpire
- Michael A. DiSpezio (born 1953) – writer, performer, and broadcast host
- Chris DiStefano (born 1984) – comedian
- Corey Dolgon – author and sociologist
- Andy Dolich – sports executive
- Candida Donadio (1929–2001) – literary agent
- Byron Donalds (born 1978) – U.S. representative for Florida
- Vincent D'Onofrio (born 1959) – actor
- Valerie D'Orazio (born 1974) – writer and blogger
- Irvin Dorfman (1924–2006) – tennis player
- Irwin Dorros (1929–2019) – telecommunications executive and engineer
- Doug E. Doug (born 1970) – comedian
- Carol Douglas (born 1948) – singer
- Donald Wills Douglas Sr. (1892–1981) – aircraft industrialist and engineer
- John E. Douglas (born 1945) – special agent and unit chief in the United States Federal Bureau of Investigation
- Michael Dowd (born 1961) – police officer and convicted drug distributor who was the subject of the 2014 film The Seven Five
- Daniel B. Drachman (1932–2022) – neurologist
- David Draiman (born 1973) – singer
- Arthur Drexler (1925–1987) – curator of the Museum of Modern Art
- Henry Dreyfuss (1904–1972) – industrial designer
- Richard Dreyfuss (born 1947) – actor
- Veronica Driscoll (1926–1994) – nurse and labor organizer
- Jim Drucker (born 1952/1953) – former Commissioner of the Continental Basketball Association, former Commissioner of the Arena Football League, and founder of NewKadia Comics
- Don Dubbins (1928–1991) – actor
- William S. Dudley (born 1936) – naval historian
- Crescentius Richard Duerr (1922–2005) – president of De La Salle University
- Allen B. DuMont (1901–1965) – electronics engineer, scientist, inventor, and founder of the DuMont Television Network
- Lena Dunham (born 1986) – actress and writer (Brooklyn Heights)
- Kyle Bobby Dunn (born 1986) – composer, musician, artist (RAMBO)
- Walter L. Durack (1857–1918) – lawyer, politician, and judge
- William West Durant (1850–1934) – designer
- Jimmy Durante (1893–1980) – actor and comedian
- Florence Spencer Duryea (1884–1966) – philanthropist
- Michael Dweck (born 1957) – visual artist and filmmaker

== E ==
- Easy Mo Bee (born 1965) – hip-hop and R&B producer
- William J. Ecker – U.S. Coast Guard rear admiral
- David Carl Edelman (born 1961) – former chief marketing officer at Aetna and Harvard Business School professor
- Harry Eisenstat (1915–2003) – Major League Baseball player (Madison)
- Arthur Rose Eldred (1895–1951) – agricultural and railroad industry executive, civic leader, and the first Eagle Scout in the Boy Scouts of America
- H. Wentworth Eldredge (1909–1991) – sociologist, urban planner, and World War II spy
- Niles Eldredge (born 1943) – biologist and paleontologist
- Arthur Elgort (born 1940) – fashion photographer
- Stanley Ellin (1916–1986) – mystery writer
- Erick Arc Elliott (born 1990) – rapper, producer
- Louis Eppolito (1948–2019) – New York City Police officer who worked for the American Mafia
- Benjamin Epstein (1912–1983) – national director of the Anti-Defamation League
- Jeffrey Epstein – wealthy businessman and longtime child sex trafficker
- Aprille Ericsson (born 1963) – aerospace engineer
- Etika (1990–2019) – YouTuber and online streamer
- Lou Everett (1924–1965) – United States Army Air Corps fighter pilot and test pilot
- Natale Evola (1907–1973) – mobster
- Miriam Ezagui (born 1986) – nurse and TikToker

== F ==
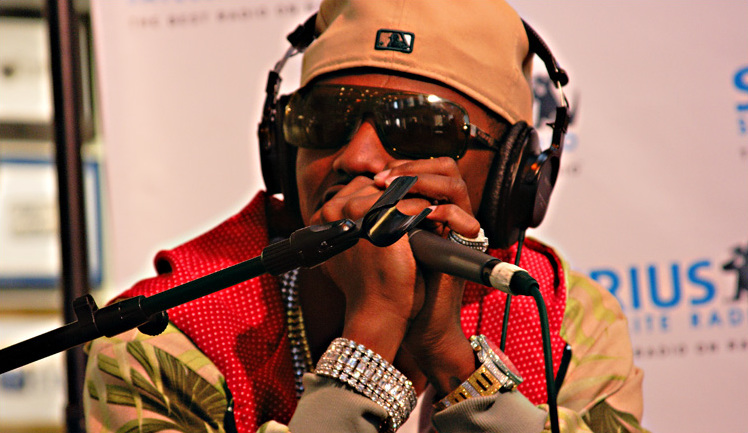
Fabolous

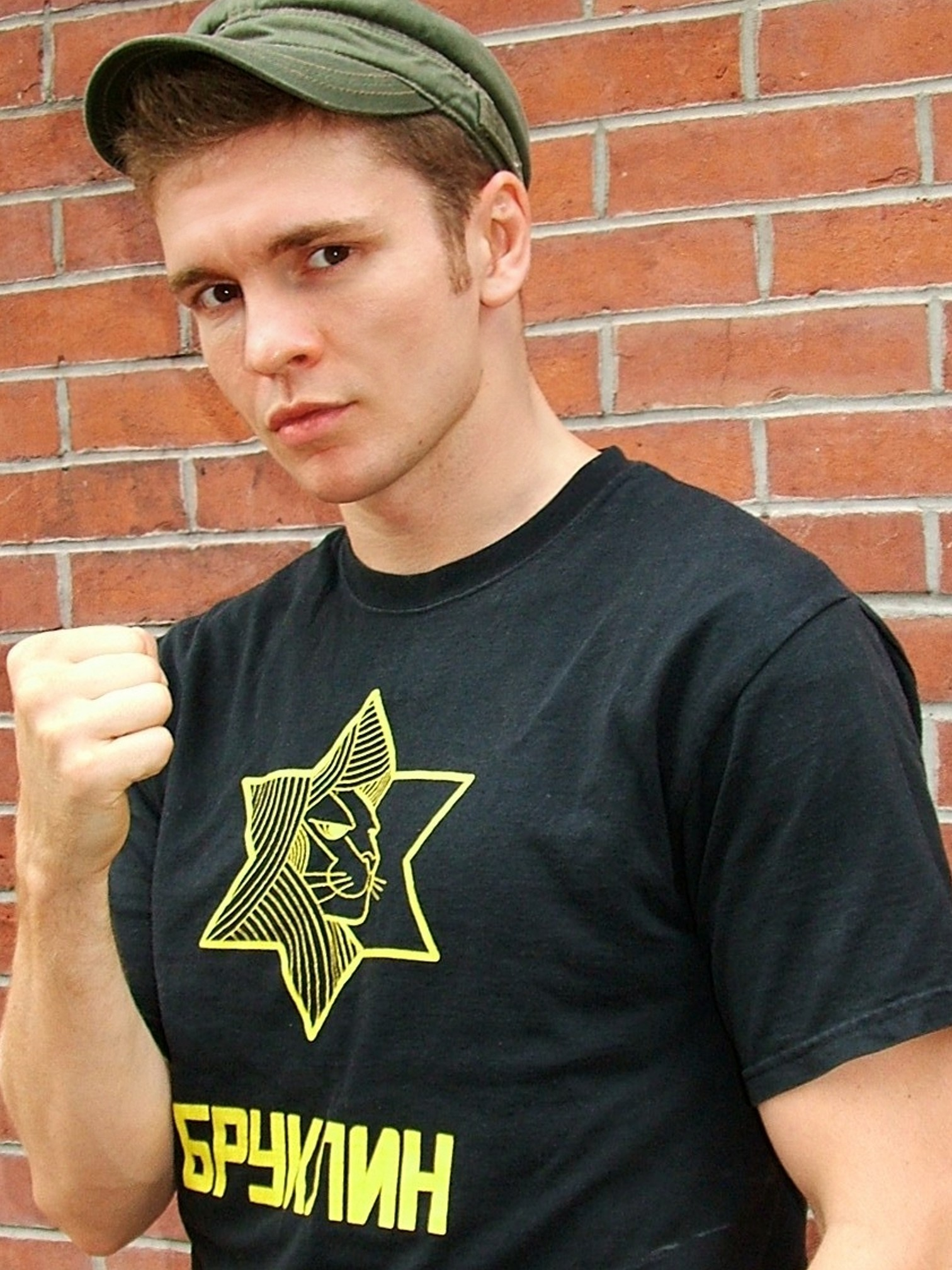
Yuri Foreman

- Fabolous (born 1977) – rapper (Bedford-Stuyvesant)
- Tony Fabrizio (born 1960) – political strategist and polster
- Walter Fairservis (1921–1994) – archaeologist
- Edie Falco (born 1963) – actress
- Gertrude Falk (1925–2008) – physiologist
- Jimmy Fallon (born 1974) – actor and comedian
- Abram P. Fardon (1837–1913) – politician and dentist
- Steve Farhood (born 1957) – boxing historian and analyst
- Ahmad Farooq (1981−2015) – terrorist
- Bob Farrell (1927–2015) – motivational speaker
- Anthony Fauci (born 1940) – infectious disease expert, director of NIAD at National Institutes of Health
- Alex Faust (born 1989) – sportscaster
- Lotta Faust (1880–1910) – musical comedy actress
- Vincent Favale (born 1959) – co-founder of Comedy Central
- Tom Feelings (1933–2003) – artist, cartoonist, children's book illustrator, author, teacher, and activist
- Lillian Feickert (1877–1945) – suffragette and politician
- Stu Feiner (born 1961) – sports handicapper and media personality
- Eliot Feld (born 1942) – modern ballet choreographer, performer, teacher, and director
- Harvey Feldman (1931–2009) – diplomat who planned the 1972 Nixon visit to China
- Charles Feltman (1841–1910) – restaurateur
- Bob Ferguson (1845–1894) – MLB player
- Jerry Ferrara (born 1979) – actor
- Frank Ferrer (born 1966) – Guns N' Roses drummer
- Suzi Ferrer (1940–2006) – US/Puerto-Rican visual artist and feminist
- Lou Ferrigno (born 1951) – former bodybuilder, actor (Midwood)
- Martin Fettman (born 1956) – astronaut (Midwood)
- Ailene Fields (born 1948) – sculptor
- Sheldon D. Fields (born 1970) – nurse, educator, and researcher
- Robin Fierce (born 1995) – drag performer
- Harvey Fierstein (born 1954) – actor and playwright (Bensonhurst)
- Frank Filan (1905–1952) – winner of the 1944 Pulitzer Prize for Photography
- Imero Fiorentino (1928–2013) – lighting designer
- Mario P. Fiori (born 1941) – Assistant Secretary of the Army for Installations, Energy and Environment
- Bobby Fischer (1943–2008) – champion chess player (Flatbush)
- Carl Fischer (1924–2023) – photographer
- Jesse Fischer – pianist, keyboardist, composer, and producer
- Josef E. Fischer (1937–2021) – surgeon, scientist, and professor at Harvard Medical School
- Stan Fischler (born 1932) – historian of hockey and the New York City Subway
- Florrie Fisher (1918–1972) – motivational speaker
- Larry Fisher (1907–2001) – real estate developer and philanthropist
- Mickey Fisher (1904/05–1963) – basketball coach
- Robert William Fisher (born 1961) – murderer and fugitive (FBI Ten Most Wanted)
- Sister Mary Irene FitzGibbon (1823–1896) – nun who founded the New York Foundling Hospital
- Percy Keese Fitzhugh (1876–1950) – author of children's books
- Rolf G. Fjelde (1926–2002) – playwright, educator and poet
- Yonnette Fleming (born 1968) – urban farmer
- Farrah Fleurimond – singer-songwriter and member of R&B group Lyric
- James Florio (1937–2022) – 49th governor of New Jersey, 1990–1994
- Hampton Fluker (born 1990) – actor
- CJ Fly (born 1993)
- James Foley (born 1953) – film director
- Emily Jordan Folger (1858–1936) – co-founder Folger Shakespeare Library
- Henry Clay Folger (1857–1930) – businessman
- John S. Folk (died 1885) – law enforcement officer and official in New York City
- Vivian Folkenflik (1940–2023) – educator and translator
- Cliff Fong (born 1969) – interior designer, fashion designer, and television personality
- Cristina Fontanelli – opera singer
- William H. Force (1852–1917) – merchant
- Ita Ford (1940–1980) – Maryknoll Sister who served as a missionary
- William P. Ford (1936–2008) – lawyer and bond trader
- Yuri Foreman (born 1980) – world champion boxer
- Richard Foronjy (1937–2024) – actor
- John Forsythe (1918–2010) – actor
- William Forsythe (born 1955) – actor
- Laura Fortman (born 1954) – women's rights activist, government official, and non-profit executive
- Fran Fraschilla (born 1958), basketball commentator and former college basketball coach
- Leo Frank (1884–1915) – lynching victim of an anti-semitic mob who was previously wrongly convicted of murder
- Steve Franken (1932–2012) – actor
- Bruce Franklin (born 1934) – professor
- Sidney Franklin (1903–1976) – bullfighter
- Frank Frazetta (1928–2010) – artist
- Fab 5 Freddy (born 1959) – hip-hop pioneer
- Avram C. Freedberg (born 1947) – Broadway producer
- David L. Fried (1933–2022) – scientist in the field of optics
- Gary William Friedman – composer
- Freda Friedman Salzman (1927–1981) – theoretical physicist
- Milton Friedman (1912–2006) – Nobel Prize-winning economist
- Herbert Friedmann (1900–1987) – ornithologist
- Fu-Schnickens – rapper
- Full Force – 1980s R&B and production group
- Ashrita Furman (born 1954) – juggler who holds many Guinness World Records
- Henry Watson Furniss (1868–1955) – medical doctor and diplomat

== G ==
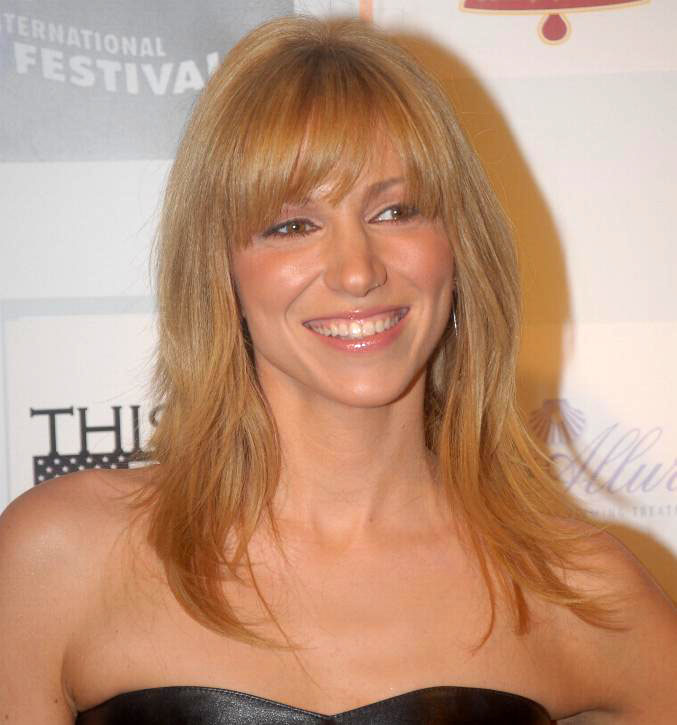
Debbie Gibson

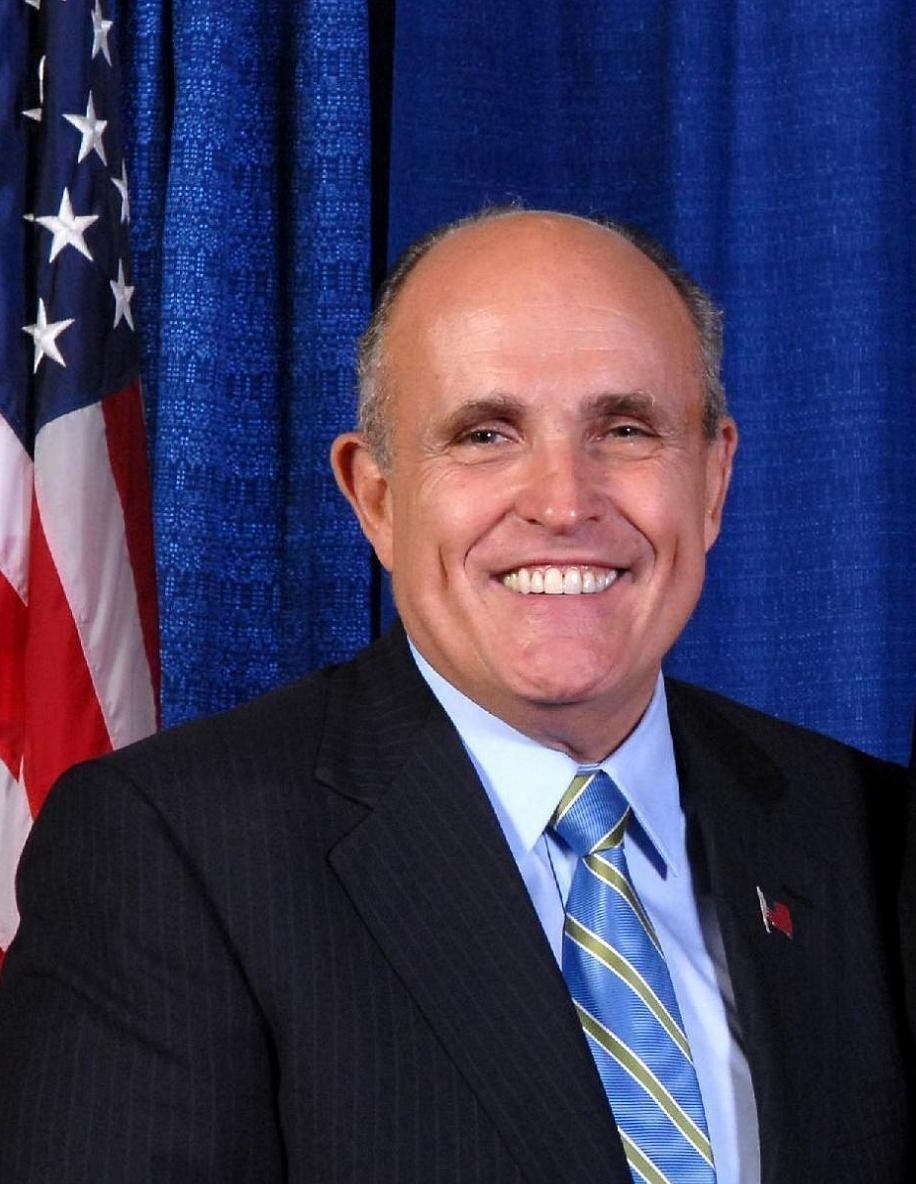
Rudy Giuliani

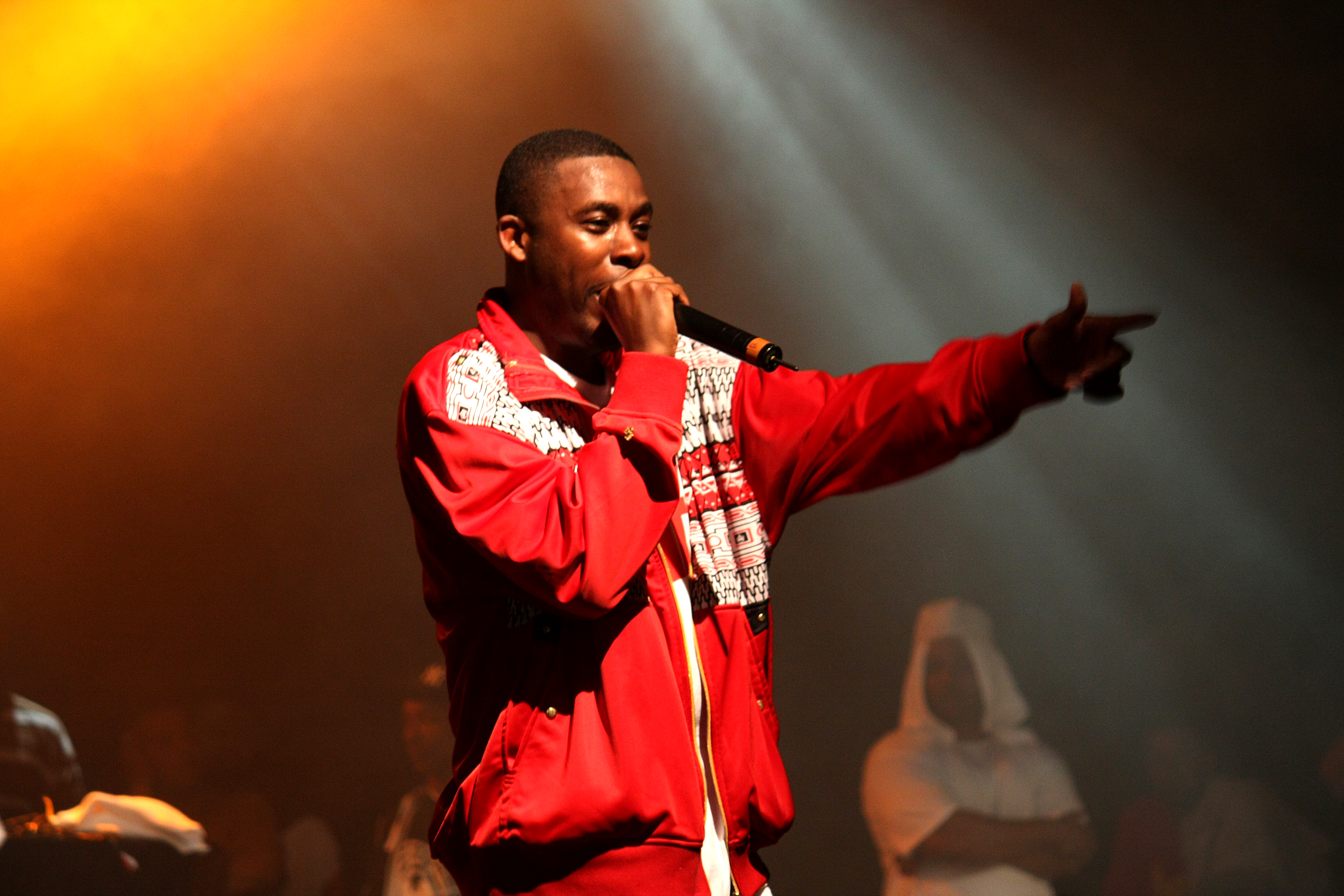
GZA

- Artie Gaffin (1948–2019) – Broadway stage manager
- Nina Gage (1883–1946) – nurse, educator, and president of the International Council of Nurses
- Zach Gage (born 1985) – video game performer
- Anthony Gaggi (1925–1988) – mobster
- William Gaines (1922–1992) – publisher and co-editor of EC Comics
- John Gallucci Jr. (born 1967) – physical therapist, athletic trainer, and executive
- Sharif El-Gamal (born 1973) – real estate developer
- Curtis Gans (1937–2015) – activist, writer, and expert on American voting patterns
- Vincent Gardenia (1920–1992) – actor (Bensonhurst)
- M. Elsa Gardner (1894–1963) – engineer
- Ina Garten (born 1948) – Food Network television chef, cookbook author; known as the Barefoot Contessa
- Shad Gaspard (1981–2020) – professional wrestler
- David Geffen (born 1943) – media mogul (Borough Park)
- Eugene Genovese (1930–2012) – historian
- Vincent J. Gentile (born 1959) – politician
- Mark Gerard (1934–2011) – equine veterinarian
- Sylvia Gerrish (1860–1906) – 19th-century musical comedy performer
- George Gershwin (1898–1937) – composer; brother of Ira Gershwin
- Murray Gerstenhaber (1927–2024) – mathematician and lawyer
- Alfred Giardino (1913–1994) – lawyer
- Deborah Gibson (born 1970) – singer and songwriter
- Paul Gibson Jr. (1927–2014) – airline executive
- Taj Gibson (born 1985) – NBA player
- Sharon Gilbert (1944–2005) – artist
- Kathleen Gilje (born 1945) – artist and art restorer
- Jessie Gillespie Willing (1888–1972) – illustrator
- Roswell Gilpatric (1906–1996) – attorney and government official
- Ruth Bader Ginsburg (1933–2020) – Associate Justice, United States Supreme Court (Madison)
- Johnny Gioeli (born 1967) – singer (Crush 40, Hardline, Axel Rudi Pell)
- Linda Giudice – gynecologist and obstetrician
- Rudy Giuliani (born 1944) – former United States attorney, former mayor of New York; 2008 Republican presidential candidate
- Daniel Glass – music industry executive
- Ira Glasser (born 1938) – civil liberties activist
- Jackie Gleason (1916–1987) – actor and comedian (Bushwick/ Bedford–Stuyvesant)
- S. Everett Gleason (1905–1974) – historian and intelligence analyst
- Ollie Gleichenhaus (1911–1991) – restaurateur
- Lila R. Gleitman (1929–2021) – expert on language acquisition and developmental psycholinguistics
- Marty Glickman (1917–2001) – Olympian and broadcaster (Madison)
- Joy Glidden (born 1960) – founding director, curator, television director, and senior executive
- James Newton Gloucester – African-American abolitionist
- Eleanor Glueck (1898–1972) – social worker and criminologist
- Irwin Glusker (1924–2022) – art director
- Gerry Goffin (1939–2014) – lyricist
- Jeremy Gold (1942–2018) – actuary and economist
- Richard Goldberg (born 1945) – convicted sex offender
- Wendy C. Goldberg (born 1973) – theatre director
- William Goldberg (1925–2003) – diamond dealer
- Marty Golden (born 1950) – politician
- Marvin Goldfried (born 1936) – psychologist
- Steve Goldman (born 1945) – financial advisor and former gridiron football coach
- Kathi Kamen Goldmark (1948–2012) – author, columnist, publishing consultant, radio and music producer, songwriter, and musician
- Peter C. Goldmark Jr. (born 1940) – publisher and journalist
- George Goldner (1918–1970) – owner of Tico Records and record producer and promoter
- Baruch Goldstein (1956–1994) – American-Israel extremist and perpetrator of the 1994 Cave of the Patriarchs massacre
- Jerry Goldstein (born 1970) – physicist
- Ben Goldwasser (born 1982) – member of the band MGMT
- Aquilino Gonell – United States Capitol Police officer
- Eric Gonzalez (born 1969) – politician
- Ed Goodgold (died 2021) – writer, music industry executive, and academic administrator
- Norman Gorbaty (1932–2020) – artist
- Carl Gordon (1932–2010) – actor
- Glenna Gordon (born 1981) – documentary photographer, photojournalist, editor, and educator
- Jim Gordon (1927–2003) – sportscaster
- Kyle Gordon (born 1992) – comedian, singer, and YouTuber
- Sid Gordon (1917–1975) – two-time All-Star baseball player
- Louis Gossett Jr. (1936–2024) – Oscar-winning actor (Sheepshead Bay)
- Gilbert Gottfried (1955–2022) – stand-up comedian, actor
- Morton Gottlieb (1921–2009) – Broadway producer
- Alfred Gottschalk (1930–2009) – president of Hebrew Union College and leader in the Reform Judaism movement
- Elliott Gould (born 1938) – actor
- Andrew Gounardes (born 1985) – lawyer and politician
- Earl G. Graves Sr. (1935–2020) – entrepreneur, publisher, businessman, philanthropist, and advocate of African-American businesses
- George E. Green (born 1932) – cardiac surgeon
- Irving Green (1916–2006) – founder and president of Mercury Records
- Yossi Green (born 1955) – composer
- Gary Greenberg – psychologist
- Joseph Greenberg (1915–2001) – linguist
- Martin L. Greenberg (1932–2024) – politician and jurist
- Alexander Greendale (1910–1981) – playwright and civic leader
- Brenda M. Greene (born 1950) – scholar, author, literary activist, and radio host
- Kai Greene (born 1975) – bodybuilder
- Stewart Greene (1928–2019) – advertising executive
- Martin Greenfield (1928–2024) – tailor
- Elizabeth W. Greenwood (died 1922) – social reformer in the temperance movement and evangelist
- Adrian Grenier (born 1976) – actor (Clinton Hill)
- Harriet Griffin (1903–1991) – mathematician and author
- Bill Griffith (born 1944) – cartoonist (Zippy)
- David Grimm (born 1965) – award-winning playwright and screenwriter
- Emmett Grogan (1942–1978) – actor and founder of the Diggers
- Leib Groner (1931–2020) – Chabad-Lubavitch Rabbai and secretary to Menachem Schneerson (Crown Heights)
- Ernest A. Gross (1906–1999) – diplomat and lawyer
- Karl Grossman (born 1942) – professor, journalist, author, TV program host
- Mildred Grossman (1916–1988) – educator, civil rights activist, unionist, and a photographer
- Robert Grossman (1940–2018) – illustrator
- Bob Guccione (1930–2010) – adult-magazine publisher
- Louise Gunning (1879–1960) – singer, actress
- Sigrid Gurie (1911–1969) – actress
- Arlo Guthrie (born 1947) – singer (Coney Island)
- Amy Gutmann (born 1949) – diplomat
- Jack M. Guttentag (1923–2024) – banker and academic
- Maggie Gyllenhaal (born 1970) – actress
- GZA (born 1966) – rapper (Bedford–Stuyvesant)

== H ==
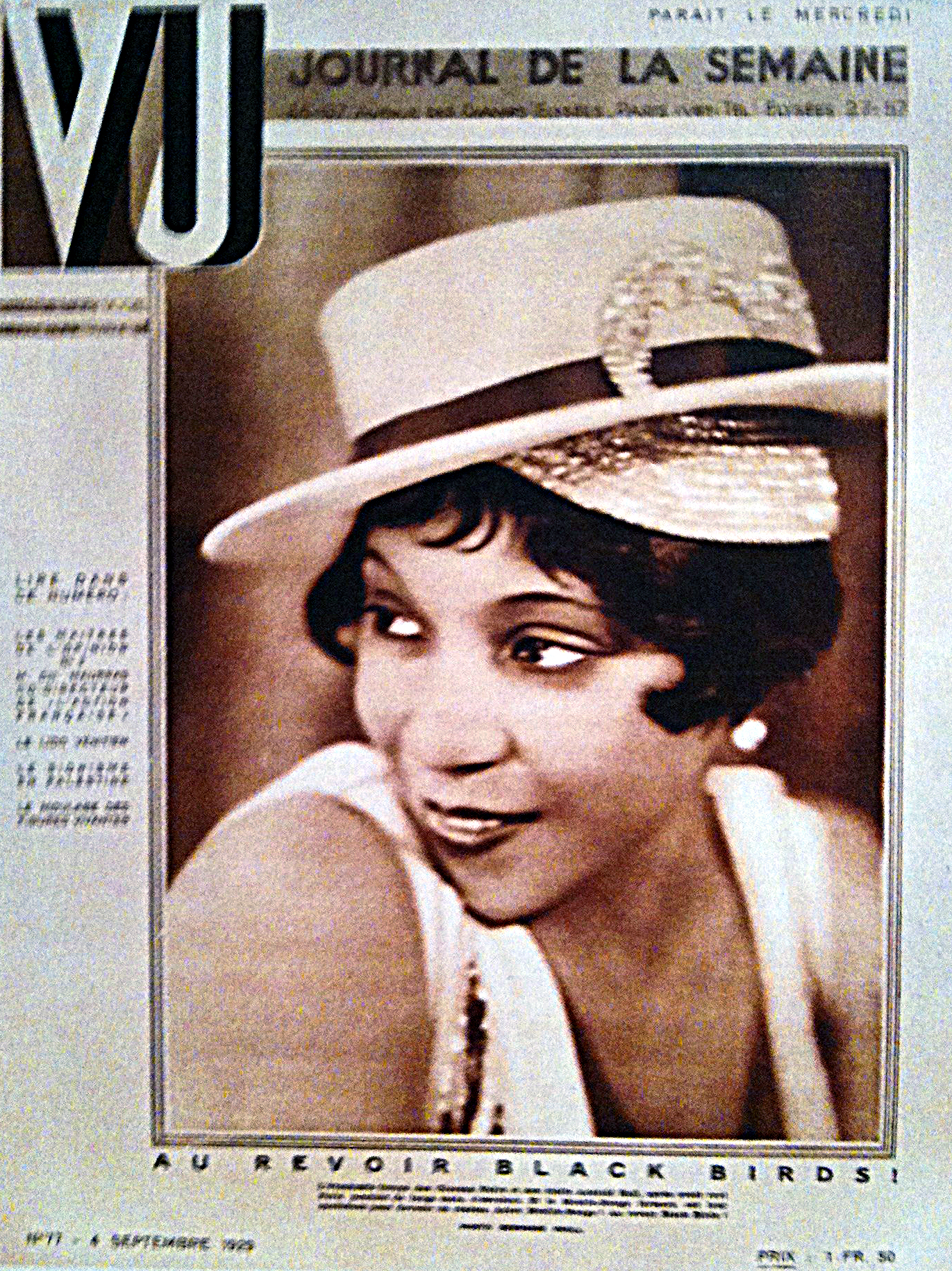
Adelaide Hall

- Richard N. Haass (born 1951) – diplomat
- Buddy Hackett (1924–2003) – actor and comedian (Williamsburg)
- Deana Haggag (born 1987) – curator
- Amy Halberstadt (born 1954) – psychologist
- Adelaide Hall (1901–1993) – jazz singer, songwriter, actress
- Jimmy Hall (born 1994), basketball player in the Israeli National League
- Morton Halperin (born 1938) – analyst
- Bobby Hambel – guitarist, Biohazard
- Marvin Hamlisch (1944–2012) – Oscar-winning composer of film scores (Midwood)
- Q. R. Hand Jr. (1937–2020) – poet
- Steven Handel (born 1945) – ecologist and educator
- Michelle Handelman (born 1960) – artist, writer, and filmmaker
- Andis Harasani (1971–2025) – politician and economist
- Bethann Hardison – fashion model and activist
- Kadeem Hardison (born 1965) – actor
- Charles Hardy (died 2023) – competitive eater
- Carter Harman (1918–2007) – composer, writer, and music industry executive
- Steve Harmon (1940–2008) – actor
- Edward John Harper (1910–1990) – Roman Catholic bishop
- Andrew P. Harris (born 1957) – Maryland politician
- Anita G. Harris (1937–2014) – geologist, paleontologist, and mapmaker
- Eileen Harris (born 1932) – architectural historian and author
- Larry Harris (1947–2017) – co-founder of Casablanca Records
- Barbara Grizzuti Harrison (1934–2002) – author
- George Harrison (1915–2004) – gun runner for the Irish Republican Army
- Richard James Hart (1892–1952) – sharpshooter and prohibition agent
- Carol Harter (1941–2023) – president of the University of Nevada, Las Vegas
- Anne Hathaway (born 1982) – Oscar-winning actress
- Knut Haukelid (1911–1994) – Norwegian resistance movement soldier
- Webley John Hauxhurst (1809–1874) – pioneer
- Richie Havens (1941–2013) – folk singer-songwriter, actor; first performer at the original Woodstock (Bedford–Stuyvesant)
- Connie Hawkins (1942–2017) – basketball player
- James Hayden (1953–1983) – actor
- Melissa Hayden – poker player
- Ulric Haynes (1931–2020) – diplomat, lawyer, and academic
- Susan Hayward (1917–1975) – Oscar-winning actress (Flatbush)
- Rita Hayworth (1918–1987) – actress
- Joseph A. Healey (1930–2005) – US Army major general
- Michael Hebranko (1953–2013) – man who suffered from an extreme case of morbid obesity
- Abraham Hecht (1922–2013) – Chabad-affiliated American Orthodox rabbi
- Jamie Hector (born 1975) – actor
- Kenneth Heilman (1938–2024) – behavioral neurologist
- Albert S. Heinrich (1889–1974) – pioneer aviator
- Esther Heins (1908–2007) – artist, scientific illustrator, and author
- Hermann Helms (1870–1963) – chess player and writer
- Leona Helmsley (1920–2007) – businessperson and real estate investor
- Heltah Skeltah – hip-hop duo (Brownsville)
- Joseph Henderson (1826–1890) – harbor pilot
- Sheldon Saul Hendler (1936–2012) – scientist, physician and musician
- Gabe Henry (born 1988) – author and humorist
- Patrick T. Henry (born 1950) – Assistant Secretary of the Army (Manpower and Reserve Affairs)
- Aileen Hernandez (1926–2017) – union organizer, civil rights activist, and women's rights activist
- William H. Herriman (1829–1918) – art collector
- Judah Hertz (died 2021) – real estate investor and philanthropist
- Sidney Hertzberg (1922–2005) – pro basketball player
- Robert Hess (1935–2014) – sculptor
- Robert Hess (1938–1994) – president of Brooklyn College
- Bob Heussler – sports broadcaster
- Jery Hewitt (1949–2020) – actor, stuntman
- Israel Hicks (1943–2010) – theatre director
- Thomas Michael Higgins (born 1966) – entrepreneur, investor, and banker
- Vannie Higgins (1897–1932) – mobster
- Henry Hill (1943–2012) – mobster, subject of Goodfellas
- Newell Dwight Hillis (1858–1929) – minister and philosopher
- Mildred Hilson (1898–1994) – socialite and philanthropist
- Kenneth R. Himes (born 1950) – Roman Catholic theologian
- Russel Hobbs – drummer; member of Gorillaz
- William E. Hoehle – member of the Wisconsin State Assembly
- Steven Hoffenberg – fraudster
- Hendrick S. Holden (1849–1918) – politician and banker
- Bobby Hollander (1929–2002) – publisher and pornographic film director and actor
- Jean Hollander (1928–2019) – poet, translator and teacher
- Zander Hollander (1923–2014) – sportswriter, journalist, editor and archivist
- Thomas Holmes (died 1900) – mortician
- Hamilton Holt (1872–1951) – educator, editor, author and politician
- Red Holzman (1920–1998) – Hall of Fame NBA two-time All-Star and coach
- Molly Holzschlag (1963–2023) – Open Web advocate and author
- Homicide (born 1977) – ring name of Nelson Erazo, professional wrestler signed to Ring of Honor (Bedford-Stuyvesant)
- Sidney Hook (1902–1989) – philosopher
- Alfred Horn (1918–2001) – mathematician
- Lena Horne (1917–2010) – singer and actress (Bedford–Stuyvesant)
- Louis Hostlot (1848–1884) – priest
- Avis and Effie Hotchkiss – mother and daughter pioneering motorcyclists
- Bess Houdini (1876–1943) – stage assistant and wife of Harry Houdini
- Henry Alonzo House (1840–1930) – inventor
- Curly Howard (Jerome Lester Horwitz; 1903–1952) – comedian; member of The Three Stooges (Brownsville)
- Moe Howard (Moses Harry Horwitz; 1897–1975) – comedian; leader of the Three Stooges (Brownsville)
- Shemp Howard (Samuel Horwitz; 1895–1955) – comedian; member of the Three Stooges (Brownsville)
- Brigid Hughes – literary editor
- Charles F. Hummel (born 1932) – curator and author
- William G. Hundley (1925–2006) – criminal defense attorney for high-profile clients, reared in Brooklyn
- Anna Graham Hunter – writer
- Hezekiah Hunter (1837–1894) – teacher, minister, and politician; born in Brooklyn
- Frederick Hutson – businessman
- Amy J. Hyatt (born 1955) – diplomat
- Alice Clary Earle Hyde (1876–1943) – botanical artist and conservationist

== I ==
- Laura Ingalls (1893–1967) – aviator who won the Harmon Trophy
- Anthony Ingrassia (1944–1995) – playwright, producer and director
- Alex Inkeles (1920–2010) – sociologist and social psychologist
- Jimmy Iovine (born 1953) – entrepreneur, record producer and film producer (Red Hook)
- Alice Recknagel Ireys (1911–2000) – landscape architect
- Breuk Iversen (born 1964) – designer and writer

== J ==
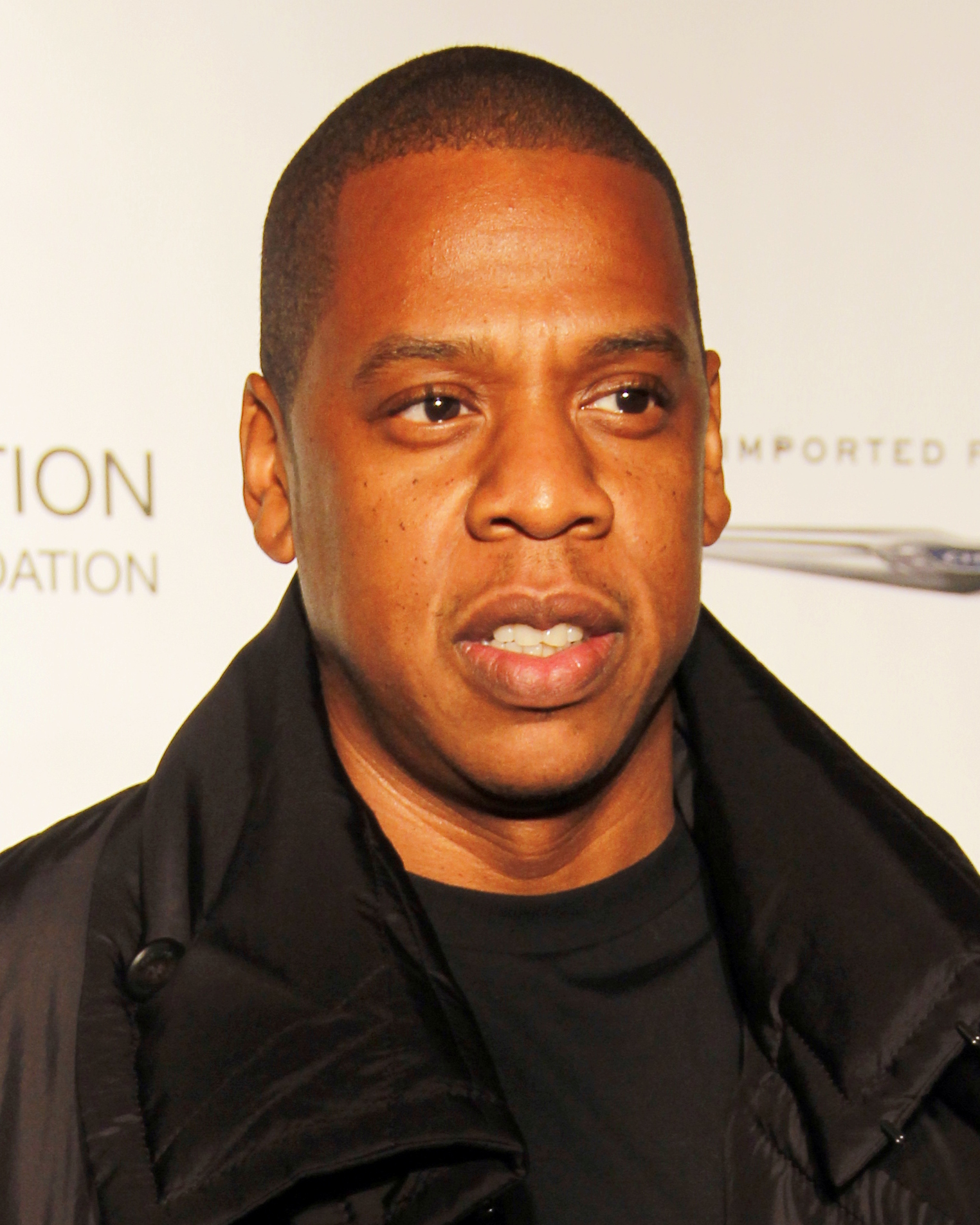
Jay-Z

- Richard C. Jack – animator
- Mark Jackson (born 1965) – basketball player
- Randolph Jackson (born 1943) – lawyer and judge
- Fishel Jacobs (born 1956) – rabbi and writer
- Maura Jacobson (1926–2017) – crossword puzzle creator
- Oswald Jacoby (1902–1984) – contract bridge player and author
- Lloyd Jacquet (1899–1970) – founder of Funnies, Inc.
- Cheryl James (born 1966) – rapper and actress
- John Wells James (1873–1951) – artist
- Shawn James (born 1983) – basketball player for Maccabi Tel Aviv
- Tama Janowitz (born 1957) – novelist
- Jay-Z (born 1969) – rapper and entrepreneur (Bedford–Stuyvesant)
- Jaz-O (born 1964) – rapper (Bedford–Stuyvesant)
- Hakeem Jeffries (born 1970) –Minority Leader of the U.S. House of Representatives and former New York State Assemblyman
- Anna V. Jefferson (1926–2011) – politician
- Charles Jenkins (born 1989) – NBA player
- J. T. W. Jennings (1856–1944) – architect
- Paul Jennings (1918–1987) – president of the International Union of Electrical Workers
- Jennie Jerome (1854–1921) – Lady Randolph Churchill, mother of Winston Churchill (Cobble Hill)
- Jeru the Damaja (born 1972) – rapper (East New York)
- W. L. G. Joerg (1885–1952) – geographer
- Ariyan A. Johnson – actress, television director, dancer and choreographer
- Evan M. Johnson – US Army brigadier general
- Evan Malbone Johnson (1791–1865) – clergyman
- Maliq Johnson (born 2000) – actor
- Tamara "Taj" Johnson-George (born 1971) – member of R&B group SWV (Bedford–Stuyvesant)
- Alexander Johnston (died 1889) – historian
- Nathan S. Jonas (1868–1943) – banker and philanthropist
- Jasmine Cephas Jones (born 1989) – actress, singer, songwriter
- Lamont Jones (born 1972) – basketball player
- Norah Jones (born 1979) – musician, actress
- Odyssey Jones (born 1994) – professional wrestler
- Susannah Mushatt Jones (1899–2016) – oldest living New Yorker
- Jim Jonsin (born 1970) – record producer and songwriter
- E. Bernard Jordan (born 1959) – founder of Zoe Ministries
- June Jordan (1936–2002) – poet, essayist, teacher, and activist
- Michael Jordan (born 1963) – basketball player
- Pierre Joris (born 1946) – poet, essayist, translator, and anthologist
- Audrey Joseph – record executive, nightclub owner and manager, and LGBT rights activist
- William Joyce (1906–1946) – Nazi propaganda broadcaster; executed for treason
- Zab Judah (born 1977) – professional boxer
- David Julius (born 1955) – Nobel laureate
- Lee Jussim (born 1955) – social psychologist
- Just-Ice (born 1965) – rapper

== K ==
Hall of Famer Sandy Koufax

Hall of Famer Roger Kahn

- KA (born 1972) – rapper (Brownsville, Brooklyn)
- Julia Kaganskiy (born 1986) – curator
- Meir Kahane (1932–1990) – Orthodox Jewish rabbi, activist and founder of the Jewish Defense League
- Roger Kahn (1927–2020) – sportswriter and author of The Boys of Summer
- Bill Kaiserman (1942–2020) – fashion designer
- Big Daddy Kane (born 1968) – rapper (Bedford–Stuyvesant)
- Edith Kaplan (1924–2009) – psychologist and pioneer of neuropsychological tests
- Eric Kaplan (born 1971) – writer (Flatbush)
- Gabe Kaplan (born 1943) – actor and comedian
- Mitch Kapor (born 1950) – entrepreneur
- Daniella Karagach (born 1992) – dancer and choreographer
- Stanley Karnow (1925–2013) – journalist and historian
- Ivan Karp (1926–2012) – art dealer
- Leon Karp (1903–1951) – artist
- Ed Kasky (1919–1997) – NFL player
- Abraham Katz (1926–2013) – diplomat, United States ambassador to the OECD
- Jack Katz (born 1927) – artist
- Kaves – fine art painter, graffiti artist, illustrator, director, actor, author, rapper, and entrepreneur (Bay Ridge, Brooklyn)
- KAWS, born Brian Donnelly – graffiti artist, limited-edition clothing and toy designer
- Danny Kaye (1911–1987) – actor and comedian (East New York)
- Lainie Kazan (born 1940) – actress and singer
- Shake Keane (1927–1997) – jazz musician and poet
- Ezra Jack Keats (1916–1983) – author and illustrator
- Monica Keena (born 1979) – actress
- Harvey Keitel (born 1939) – actor
- Steven G. Kellman (born 1947) – author and critic
- Patsy Kelly (1910–1981) – actress
- Raja Feather Kelly – dancer and choreographer
- Wilhelmena Rhodes Kelly – historian, genealogist, and writer
- Ken Kelsch (1947–2023) – cinematographer
- John Whitefield Kendrick (1917–2009) – economist
- David M. Kennedy (born 1958) – professor of criminology at John Jay College of Criminal Justice, author of Don't Shoot
- Don Kennedy (1932–2014), paralympic athlete, weightlifter and wheelchair basketball player
- Elizabeth Lapovsky Kennedy (born 1939) – feminist and pioneer in women's studies
- Norm Kent (1949–2023) – criminal defense attorney, publisher, and radio talk show host
- Kasim Keto – music producer
- Aleksandr Khazanov (born 1979) – mathematician
- William Chauncey Kibbe (died 1904) – Adjutant General of California
- The Kid Gashi (born 1989) – rapper
- Eleanor Kieliszek (1925–2017) – politician * Antony Ferdinand Kilbourn (1894–1961) – president of De La Salle College
- Jimmy Kimmel (born 1967) – comedian and television talk-show host
- Michael Kimmel (born 1951) – sociologist
- Bernard King (born 1956) – NBA Hall of Famer (Fort Greene)
- Carole King (born 1942) – singer-songwriter (Madison)
- Larry King (1933–2021) – television talk-show host and interviewer
- Shaka King (born 1980) – film director, screenwriter, and film producer
- June Kirby (1928–2022) – actress, model, and wardrobe supervisor for Hollywood films
- Marvin Kitman (1929–2023) – television critic, humorist, and author
- Matthew Klapper – attorney
- Anne Klein (1923–1974) – fashion designer
- Florence Klotz (1920–2006) – costume designer
- Joseph P. Knapp (1864–1951) – publisher and philanthropist
- Rachel Kohl Finegold (born 1980) – rabbi
- Brian Kokoska (born 1988) – artist
- Saritha Komatireddy (born 1984 or 1985) – federal prosecutor and former chief of staff of the Drug Enforcement Administration, Republican nominee for attorney general of New York in the 2026 election.
- Jerome B. Komisar (born 1937) – economist
- C. Everett Koop (1916–2013) – U.S. Surgeon General
- Constance Kopp (1878–1931) – first female undersheriff in the United States
- Bertram Kostant (1928–2017) – mathematician
- Sandy Koufax (born 1935) – Hall of Fame baseball pitcher for Brooklyn and Los Angeles Dodgers (Borough Park)
- Martin Kove (born 1946) – actor
- Nikolas Kozloff (born 1969) – academic, author and photojournalist
- Carl Hermann Kraeling (1897–1966) – theologian, historian, and archaeologist
- Edward E. Kramer (born 1961) – editor, co-founder of Dragon Con, and convicted child molester.
- Jerome Krase (born 1943) – social scientist and academic
- John Krasinski (born 1979) – actor and director
- Philip Krey (born 1950) – former president of Lutheran Theological Seminary at Philadelphia
- Martin H. Krieger (1944–2024) – physicist
- Alan M. Kriegsman (1928–2012) – dance critic
- Paul L. Krinsky (1928–2023) – admiral in the merchant marines and superintendent of the United States Merchant Marine Academy
- Lucy Kroll (1909–1997) – theatrical and literary agent
- Ethan Kross – experimental psychologist, neuroscientist and writer
- Rich Krueger (born 1960) – rock singer-songwriter and neonatologist
- Jeff Kwatinetz (born 1965) – entertainment industry executive
- Talib Kweli (born 1975) – rapper and producer (Park Slope)

== L ==
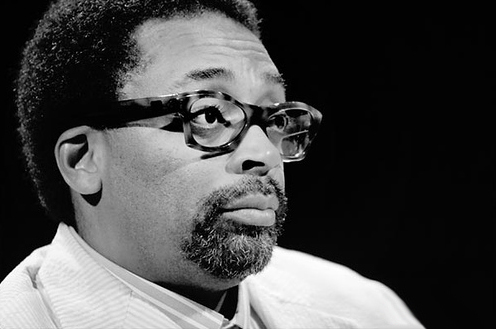
Spike Lee

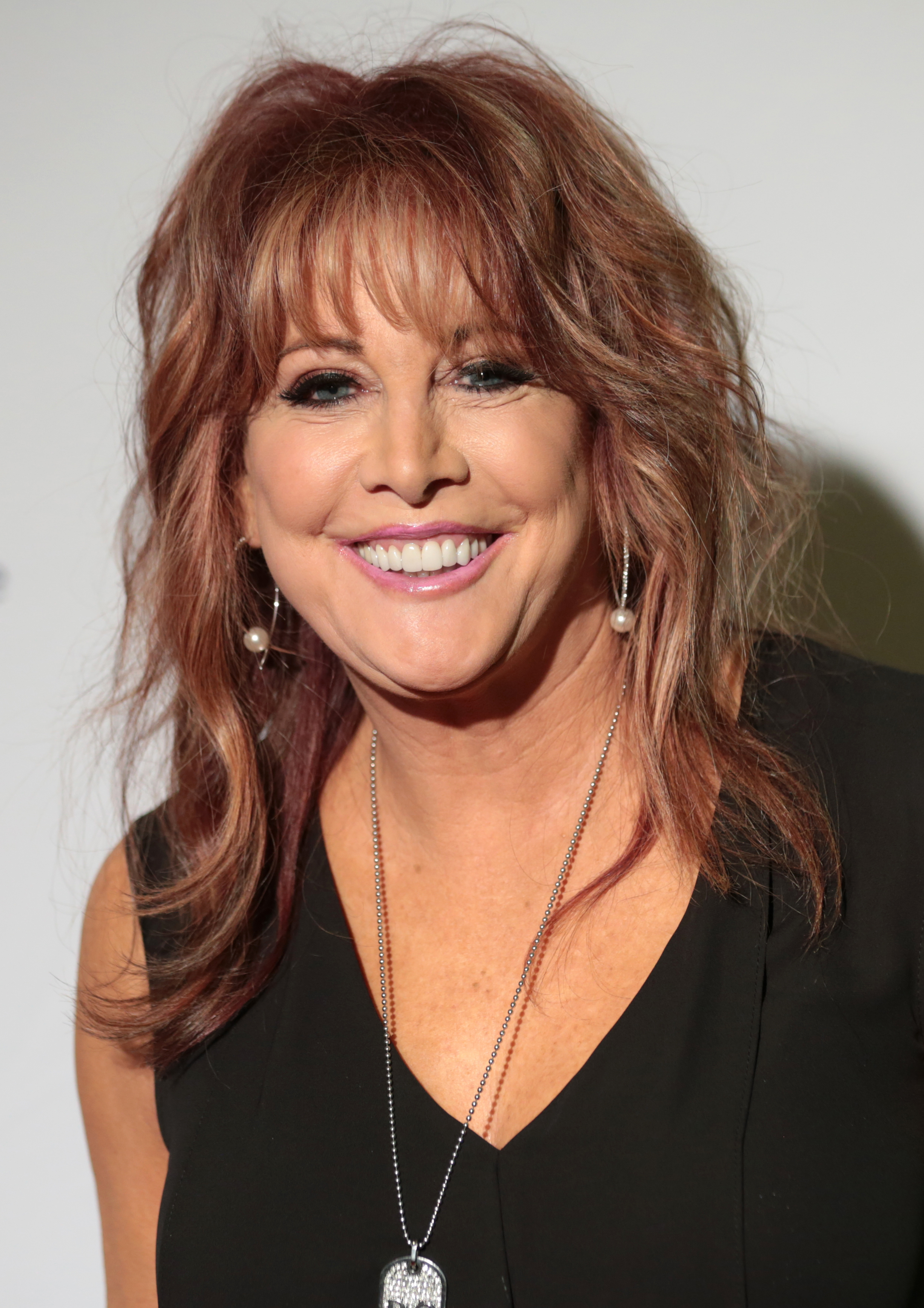
Nancy Lieberman

- Marisa Lago (born 1955) – attorney
- David D. Laitin (born 1945) – political scientist and academic
- Jeffrey Laitman (born 1951) – anatomist
- Kamala Shirin Lakhdhir – diplomat
- Pierre Lallement (1843–1891) – inventor
- Alfred A. Lama (1899–1984) – architect and politician
- Alexander B. Lamberton (1839–1919) – politician, conservationist and lumberman
- John LaMotta (1939–2014) – actor
- Rachel Lampert – playwright, director, and choreographer
- Sylven Landesberg (born 1990) – American-Israeli basketball shooting guard (Maccabi Tel Aviv)
- Michael Landon – actor, director, producer
- Abbe Lane (born 1932) – singer, dancer, actress
- Arthur Bliss Lane (1894–1956) – diplomat
- Mark Lane (1927–2016) – attorney, politician, and civil rights activist
- Dulcinea Langfelder (born 1955) – multidisciplinary artist (drama, dance, song, mime, multimedia)
- Alphonse F. La Porta (born 1939) – diplomat
- Rose La Rose (1918–1972) – dancer and actress
- Rudy LaRusso (1937–2004) – five-time All-Star NBA basketball player (Madison)
- William S. Lasdon (1896–1984) – pharmaceutical executive and philanthropist
- Reuben Lasker (1929–1988) – marine biologist
- Catherine Allen Latimer (1896–1948) – librarian
- Cyndi Lauper (born 1953) – singer and activist
- Arthur Laurents (1917–2011) – writer and director
- Steve Lawrence (1935–2024) – singer and actor
- Heath Ledger (1979–2008) – actor
- Edward Lee (born 1972) – chef
- Ivan Lee (born 1981) – Olympic saber fencer; banned for life by SafeSport
- Roy Lee (born 1969) – film producer
- Spike Lee (born 1957) – film director, screenwriter and actor (lived in Fort Greene)
- Marlon Legere (born 1975) – convicted murderer
- Sandra Leiblum (1943–2010) – author, lecturer, and researcher in sexology
- Shulem Lemmer (born 1990) – singer (Borough Park)
- Ivan Leshinsky (born 1947) – American-Israeli basketball player (Midwood)
- Jonathan Lethem (born 1964) – author (Boerum Hill)
- Andrew Levane (1920–2012) – NBA basketball player (Madison)
- Nathan Leventhal – municipal government executive, arts administrator and corporate director
- George W. LeVere (1820–1886) – pastor, educator, abolitionist, and civil rights activist
- Robert V. Levine (1945–2019) – psychologist, writer, and academic
- Stuart Levine (1932–2016) – academic and founder of the journal American Studies
- Howard Levy (born 1937) – United States Army doctor and Vietnam War resister who was court-martialed
- June Rockwell Levy (1886–1971) – philanthropist
- Lewis (alive 1890) – 19th-century professional baseball player
- Daniel Lewis (born 1944) – choreographer
- Emmanuel Lewis (born 1971) – actor (Midwood)
- Richard Lewis (1947–2024) – actor and comedian
- Robert Lewis (1909–1997) – actor, director, teacher, author and founder of the Actors Studio
- Tillie Ehrlich Lewis (1901–1977) – businesswoman
- Harvey Lichtenstein (1929–2017) – arts administrator
- Evelyn S. Lieberman (1944–2015) – first woman to serve as White House Deputy Chief of Staff
- Nancy Lieberman (born 1958) – WNBA basketball player, coach and broadcaster; Hall of Fame
- Stanley Lieberson (1933–2018) – sociologist
- Lil' Kim, born Kimberly Denise Jones (born 1974/1975) – Grammy Award-winning rapper (Bedford–Stuyvesant)
- Lil Mama (born 1989) – rapper
- Harold F. Linder (1900–1981) – banker and diplomat
- O. Winston Link (1914–2001) – photographer
- Leonard Linkow (1926–2017) – dentist and pioneer in oral implants
- Gertrude Lintz (1880–1968) – dog breeder and socialite
- Jennie Livingston (born 1962) – film and television director and producer
- Adrianne Lobel – scenic designer and producer
- Luke Vincent Lockwood (1872–1951) –
- Paul Lo Duca (born 1972) – MLB baseball player
- Edie Locke – fashion journalist
- Jack Lord (1920–1998) – actor
- Robert Logan (born 1941) – actor
- Robert K. Logan (born 1939) – scientist
- Anthony Lolli – real estate developer and founder of the Brooklyn-based brokerage firm Rapid Realty
- Steve Lombardi (born 1961) – professional wrestler, ring name "The Brooklyn Brawler"
- Vince Lombardi (1913–1970) – Pro Football Hall of Fame coach (Sheepshead Bay)
- Michael Lomonaco (born 1955) – chef, restaurateur, and television personality
- Nia Long (born 1970) – actress
- Jackie Loughery (1930–2024) – Miss New York USA 1952, Miss USA 1952
- Mynette Louie – film producer
- Murray Louis (1926–2016) – modern dancer and choreographer
- Harry Love (1911–1997) – animator
- Mia Love (1975–2025) – politician and political commentator
- Hilde Lysiak (born 2006) – journalist
- Low Ki (born 1979) – ring name of Brandon Silvestry, professional wrestler
- Sid Luckman (1916–1998) – NFL quarterback and Pro Football Hall of Fame
- Peter Luger (1866–1941) – chef and restaurateur
- Carmen Luvana (born 1981) – pornographic actress
- Danny Lyon (born 1942) – photographer and filmmaker
- MC Lyte (born 1970) – actress and rapper

== M ==
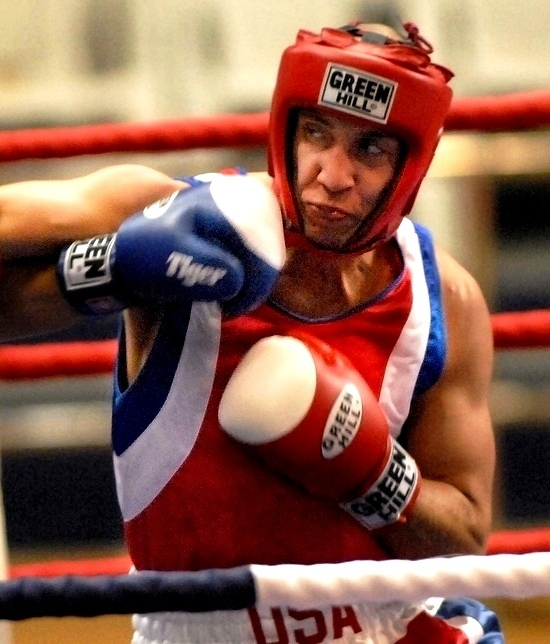
Boyd Melson

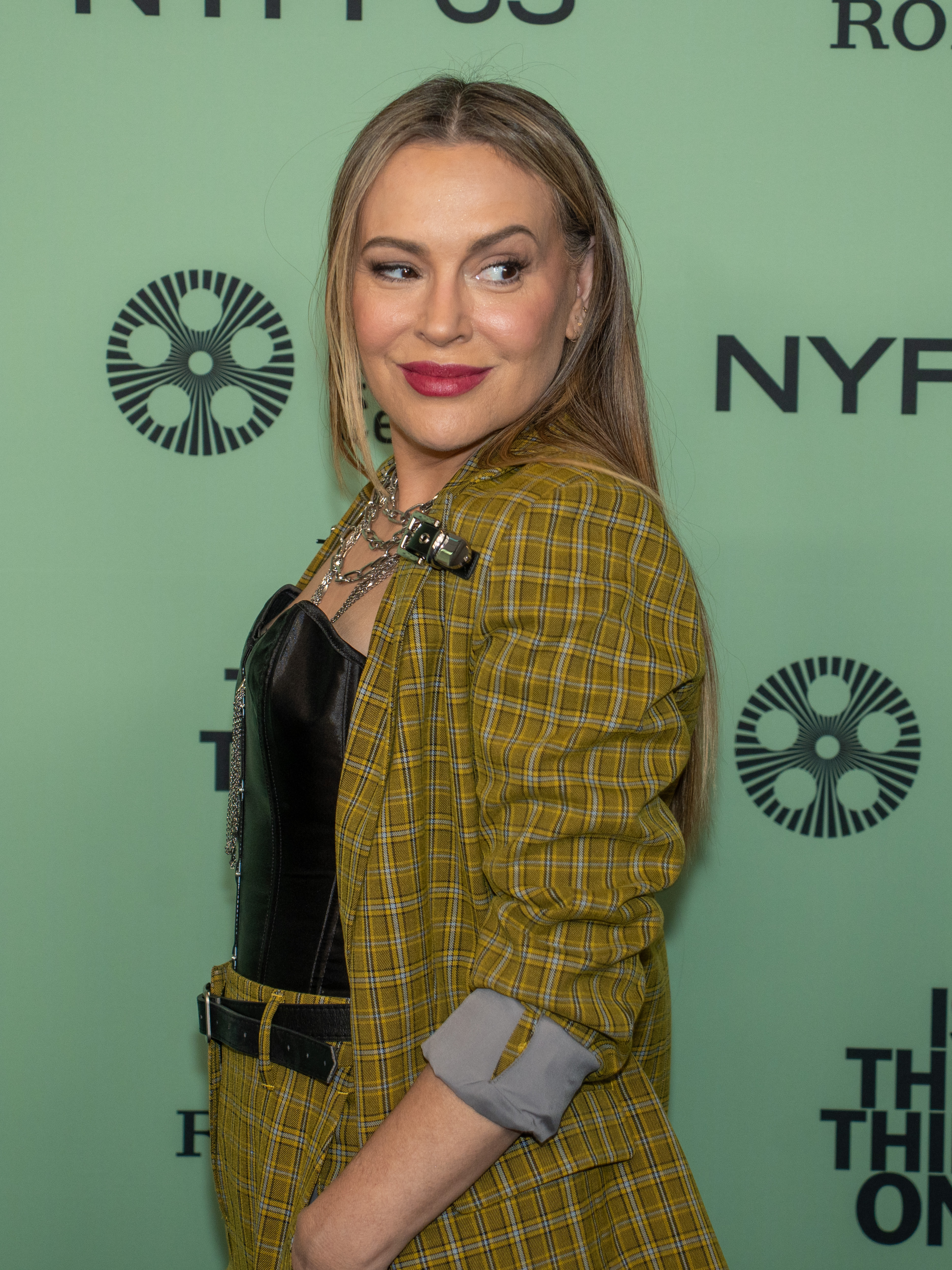
Alyssa Milano

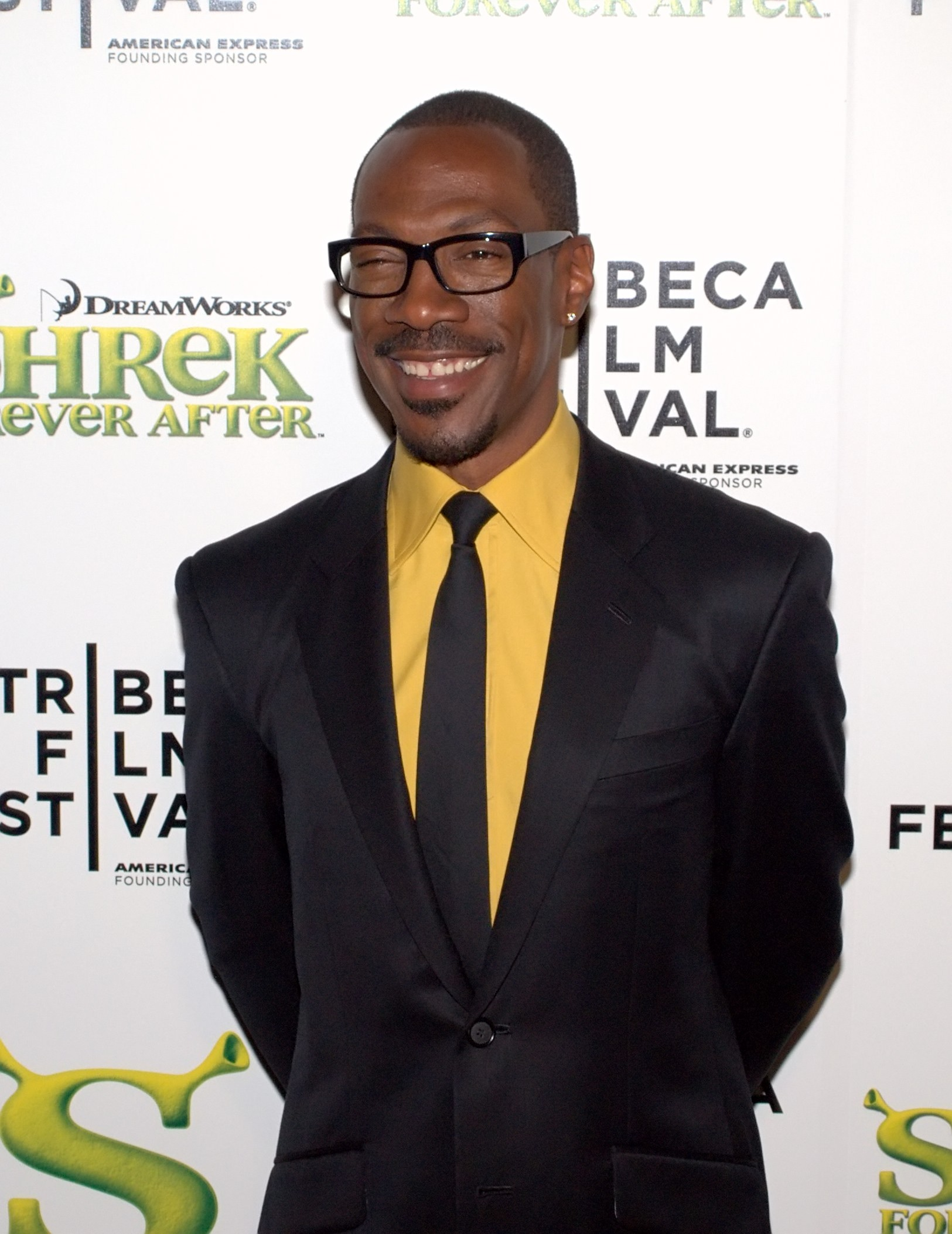
Eddie Murphy

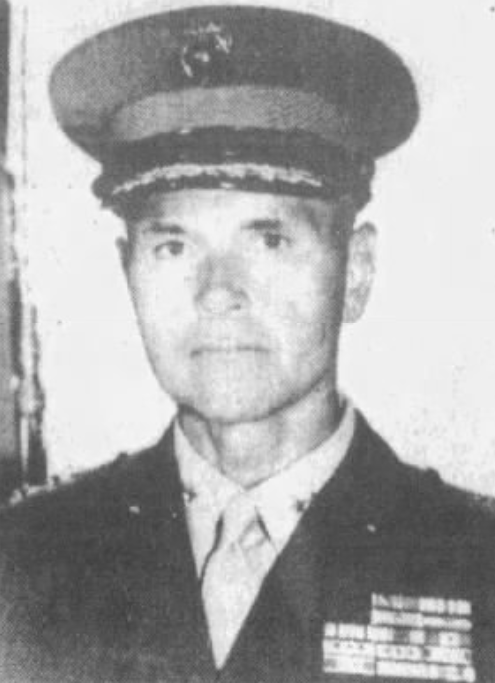
Edward J. Megarr

- Nadine Macaluso (born 1967) – psychotherapist, author, internet personality, and former model
- Clara MacBeth (1870 or 1871–1970) – heiress
- Anne Thompson MacDonald (1896–1993) – philanthropist and founder of Recording for the Blind
- Nicholas Macdonald (born 1944) – author and filmmaker
- Lester Machta (1919–2001) – meteorologist and first director of the Air Resources Laboratory
- Rose Mackenberg (1892–1968) – investigator specializing in fraudulent psychic mediums
- Joseph Maguire (born 1951) – Director of the National Counterterrorism Center
- John Buffalo Mailer (born 1978) – playwright and youngest child of author Norman Mailer
- Norman Mailer (1923–2007) – author and playwright
- Maino (born 1973) – rapper (Bedford–Stuyvesant)
- Romany Malco (born 1968) – actor
- Paul Malignaggi (born 1980) – boxer (Bensonhurst)
- Fern Mallis (born 1948) – fashion businesswoman
- Adrienne Mancia (1927–2022) – film curator
- Thomas Mancuso (1912–2004) – epidemiologist
- Irwin D. Mandel (1922–2011) – expert on dental chemistry
- Barry Manilow (born 1943) – singer-songwriter (Williamsburg)
- Mike Mansfield (1903–2001) – United States senator and congressman from Montana; born in Brooklyn
- Stephon Marbury (born 1977) – NBA player (Coney Island)
- Erin Markey (born 1981) – writer and comedian
- Mario – fictional video-game character
- Athan Maroulis (born 1964) – actor, vocalist and record producer
- Marty Markowitz (born 1945) – borough president of Brooklyn, New York City
- Constantine Maroulis (born 1975) – singer
- Carmel Carrington Marr (1921–2015) – lawyer and co-founder of the Amistad Research Center
- Branford Marsalis (born 1960) – saxophonist (Clinton Hill)
- Duane Martin (born 1965) – actor (All of Us)
- George Willard Martin (1886–1971) – mycologist
- Angie Martinez (born 1971) – radio personality, former rapper and actress
- Masta Ace (born 1966) – rapper (Brownsville)
- Abraham Maslow (1908–1970) – psychologist who created Maslow's hierarchy of needs
- Jerry Masucci (1934–1997) – attorney, businessman and co-founder of Fania Records
- Maxwell (born 1973) – singer-songwriter, producer, musician (East Brooklyn)
- William May (1953–2009) – theatre director, producer, and composer
- Alice Mayhew (1932–2020) – vice president and editorial director for Simon & Schuster
- Joan Maynard (1928−2006) – preservationist, artist, and writer
- Bruce Mazlish (1923–2016) – historian
- Paul Mazursky (1930–2014) – film director, screenwriter, and actor
- Lee Mazzilli – professional baseball player, coach, and manager; part of the 1986 World Series Champion New York Mets
- Yavilah McCoy (born 1972) – activist and founder of Ayecha
- Carson McCullers (1917–1967) – writer
- Joseph McGoldrick (1901–1978) – NYC Comptroller and NY State Residential Rent Control Commissioner, lawyer, and professor
- Thomas H. McGrath (1840–1922) – Adjutant General of New York
- Amy Upham Thomson McKean (1893–1972) – pianist, songwriter and composer
- Christopher McKee (born 1935) – historian
- Triston McKenzie – professional baseball pitcher for The Cleveland Indians
- John Bach McMaster (1852–1932) – American historian
- Meechy Darko (born 1990) – rapper (Flatbush)
- Edward J. Megarr (1927–2019) – United States Marine Corps major general
- Ronald Mellor (born 1940) – historian
- Boyd Melson (born 1981) – boxer
- Arthur I. Mendolia (1917–2007) – chemical engineer
- Ralph Mercado (1941–2009) – businessman and music promoter
- Richard Merkin (1938–2009) – painter and illustrator
- Robert Merrill (1917–2004) – opera singer
- Debra Messing (born 1968) – actress
- John C. Metzler Sr. (1909–1990) – superintendent of Arlington National Cemetery
- Martin Meyerson (1922–2007) – city planner, academic, and president of the University of Pennsylvania
- Keith Michael (born 1972) – fashion designer
- Al Michaels (born 1944) – television sportscaster
- Sean Michaels (born 1958) – pornographic actor and director
- Thomas Mignone – film director, music video director, screenwriter
- Muriel Miguel (born 1937) – director, choreographer, playwright, actor and educator
- Alyssa Milano (born 1972) – actress
- Barbara Milberg (1931–2020) – ballerina, writer, and academic
- Anita Miller (born 1931) – urbanist
- Arthur Miller (1915–2005) – Pulitzer Prize-winning playwright (Gravesend)
- Henry Miller (1891–1980) – author and raconteur (Williamsburg)
- Jarrell Miller (born 1988) – kickboxer
- Matthew Paul Miller (born 1979) – reggae singer
- Walter Miller (1890–1959) – jockey
- Wentworth Miller (born 1972) – actor
- William J. Millican (1904–1944) – double Navy Cross recipient
- Stephanie Mills (born 1957) – singer (Bedford–Stuyvesant)
- Willard L. Miranker (1932–2011) – mathematician and computer scientist
- Matthew Mirones (born 1956) – politician in the New York State Assembly
- Arnon Mishkin – management consultant, media personality, and news analyst for Fox News
- Eleanor Mlotek (1922–2013) – musicologist
- Edward L. Molineux (1833–1915) – Union Army officer, New York National Guard major general
- Rinty Monahan (1928–2003) – Major League Baseball player
- Irv Mondschein (1924–2015) – track and field champion
- Lenny Montana (1926–1992) – actor and professional wrestler
- Elisa Monte (born 1946) – choreographer and dancer
- Pilar Montero (1921–2012) – bar owner
- Evelyn Mulry Moore (1942–2012) – swimmer and Paralympic gold medalist
- Mary Tyler Moore (1936–2017) – actor
- M.O.P. – hip-hop duo (Brownsville)
- Esai Morales (born 1962) – actor
- Ed Morris (1862–1937) – 19th-century MLB pitcher
- Joel Moses (1941–2022) – former provost, MIT (Midwood)
- William A. Moses (1933–2002) – real estate developer and founder of the Community Housing Improvement Program
- Bret Mosley (born 1961) – singer-songwriter
- Mr. Muthafuckin' eXquire (born 1986) – rapper (Crown Heights)
- Isadore Gilbert Mudge (1875–1957) – librarian
- John C. Mula (1942–2018) – art director and production designer
- Chris Mullin (born 1963) – NBA player and executive, Hall of Fame
- Charlie Murphy (1959–2017) – actor and comedian
- Eddie Murphy (born 1961) – actor and comedian
- Muriel Oxenberg Murphy (1926–2008) – museum curator, art historian and socialite
- Robert Cushman Murphy (1887–1973) – ornithologist
- Barbara Myers (born 1946) – former child model and actress, raised in Bensonhurst
- Tracy Dickinson Mygatt (1885–1973) – writer, pacifist, and co-founder of the War Resisters League

== N ==
- Boris Nachamkin (1933–2018) – NBA basketball player
- Sam Nahem (1915–2004) – Major League Baseball pitcher
- Larry Namer (born 1948) – founder of E! Entertainment TV networks
- Nicole Napolitano (born 1969) – television personality and entrepreneur
- Lia Neal (born 1995) – competitive swimmer and Olympic medalist
- Lemrick Nelson (born 1975) – convicted murderer
- Nikita Nesterenko (born 2001), professional ice hockey center who plays in the National Hockey League for the Anaheim Ducks
- Edwin C. Nevis (1926–2011) – gestalt therapist
- Jack Newfield (1938–2004) – writer
- Donald J. Newman (1930–2007) – mathematician
- Stanley Newman (born 1952) – puzzle creator, editor, and publisher
- Mark Newgarden (born 1959) – artist, cartoonist, writer, creator of Garbage Pail Kids, author of We All Die Alone and How to Read Nancy (Williamsburg)
- Ed Newman (born 1951) – NFL All-Pro football player
- Victor Niederhoffer (1943– 2026) – hedge fund manager, U.S. Squash Champion and Paddleball Champion, bestselling author, and statistician.
- Mike Nieves – president and CEO of Hispanic Information and Telecommunications Network
- Louis J. Nigro Jr. (1947–2013) – diplomat
- Harry Nilsson (1941–1994) – singer-songwriter (Bushwick)
- Joakim Noah (born 1985) – NBA basketball player
- Charles Nolan (1957–2011) – fashion designer
- Peggy Noonan (born 1950) – author, columnist
- The Notorious B.I.G. (1972–1997) – rapper, born Christopher George Latore Wallace; Biggie, Biggie Smalls
- Lupita Nyong'o (born 1983) – actress

== O ==
- Eric Ober – broadcasting executive
- Henry Obst (1906–1975) – NFL football player
- O.C. (born 1971) – rapper (Bushwick)
- Greg O'Connell (1942–2025) – property developer
- Francis V. O'Connor (1937–2017) – art historian
- Tasker Oddie (1870–1950) – 12th governor of Nevada and a United States senator; born in Brooklyn
- Izzy Odigie (born 1996) – choreographer and dancer
- Dennis J. Patrick O'Grady (1943–1972) – Florida state senator
- Herbert S. Okun (1930–2011) – diplomat
- Ol' Dirty Bastard (1968–2004) – rapper (Fort Greene)
- Katherine Oliver – media and entertainment executive
- Gregory Olsen (born 1945) – astronaut and scientist
- Originoo Gunn Clappaz – hip-hop group (Brownsville)
- Waterman Ormsby (1809–1883) – engraver and inventor
- Dave Orr (1859–1915) – MLB player, born in Brooklyn
- Mary Orr (1910–2006) – actress and writer
- Joell Ortiz (born 1980) – rapper and producer (Williamsburg)
- Aileen Osofsky (1926–2010) – community leader, philanthropist and bridge player
- Steve Ostrow (1932–2024) – businessman, LGBT rights activist, and opera singer
- Adam Ottavino (born 1985) – MLB pitcher for the New York Yankees
- Daniel Oturu (born 1999) – basketball player for Hapoel Tel Aviv of the Israeli Basketball Premier League

== P ==
- Peter Pace (born 1945) – chairman of the Joint Chiefs of Staff
- Shemuel Pagan (born 1988) – professional boxer
- Frances "Fanny" Palmer (1812–1876) – artist
- Richard Palmese (born 1947) – music industry executive
- Bruce Pandolfini (born 1947) – chess player and writer on chess
- Papoose (born 1978) – rapper
- Joseph Papp (1921–1991) – theatrical impresario who created New York City's Public Theater
- Yannis Pappas (born 1976) – comedian
- John Parisella (born 1944) – horse trainer
- Lana Parrilla (born 1977) – actress
- Annie-B Parson (born 1958) – choreographer, dancer, and director
- Joe Paterno (1926–2012) – football coach at Penn State in College Football Hall of Fame
- Angela Paton (1930–2016) – theatre, TV and film actress
- Jayson Paul (born 1984) – professional wrestler
- Dickey Pearce (1836–1908) – MLB player
- Nelson Peltz (born 1942) – billionaire businessman and investor
- James W. C. Pennington (c. 1807–1870) – historian, abolitionist, orator, minister, writer, and social organizer
- Joe Pepitone (1940–2023) – professional baseball player
- Rosie Perez (born 1964) – actress and choreographer (Bushwick and later Clinton Hill)
- Rhea Perlman (born 1948) – actress
- Steven Peros – playwright, screenwriter, and director
- Harold Perrineau (born 1963) – actor
- Richard Perry (1942–2024) – record producer
- Jerome B. Peterson (1859–1943) – newspaper editor and civil servant
- Lip Pike – home run champion baseball player
- Elizabeth Pipko (born 1995) – author, model, media personality, and political operative
- Michael Pitt (born 1981) – actor and musician
- Stacey Plaskett (born 1966) – politician and attorney
- Suzanne Pleshette (1937–2008) – actress (Brooklyn Heights)
- Albert Podell (1937–2023) – magazine editor and writer, advertising executive, trial attorney, and documentary film producer and director
- Van Nest Polglase (1898–1968) – Academy Award-nominated art director
- Gene Polito (1918–2010) – cinematographer and mechanical engineer
- Robert Pollack (born 1940) – professor of biological sciences
- Mark F. Pomerantz (born 1951) – attorney, prosecutor
- Samuel Hartt Pook (1827–1901) – naval architect
- Martin Pope (1918–2022) – physical chemist
- Ed Posner (1933–1993) – information theorist and neural network researcher
- Augustus Post (1873–1952) – automotive pioneer, balloonist, early aviator, writer, actor, musician and lecturer
- Frank Potenza (1933–2011) – police officer and actor
- Troy Powell (born 1969) – dancer, choreographer, and director
- Ed Powers (born 1954) – pornographic film director, producer, actor, and radio host
- Charles Millard Pratt (1855–1935) – oil industrialist and philanthropist
- Frederic B. Pratt (1865–1945) – president of Brooklyn's Pratt Institute (1893–1937)
- George Dupont Pratt (1869–1935) – conservationist and philanthropist
- Harold Pratt (1877–1939) – oil industrialist
- Herbert L. Pratt (1871–1945) – oil industrialist
- John Pratt (1873–1927) – lawyer, philanthropist, music impresario and financier
- Sherman Pratt (1900–1964) – sportsman, explorer, and co-founder of Florida's Marineland and the Grenville Baker Boys Club
- Marianne Preger-Simon (1929–2024) – dancer, choreographer, writer, and psychotherapist
- DJ Premier (born 1966) – hip-hop disc jockey, producer, co-founder and member of hip-hop duo Gang Starr
- Priscilla Presley (born 1945) – businesswoman, actress
- S. James Press (1931–2020) – statistician
- Steven Pressman (born 1952) – economist
- Sean Price (1972–2015) – rapper (Brownsville)
- Shimon Prokupecz (born 1978) – journalist
- Elisabeth Prueitt – pastry chef
- Roger Pulvers (born 1944) – playwright and theatre director

== Q ==
- Phil Quartararo (1956–2023) – music industry executive
- Jennie Quigley (1850–1936) – sideshow performer

== R ==
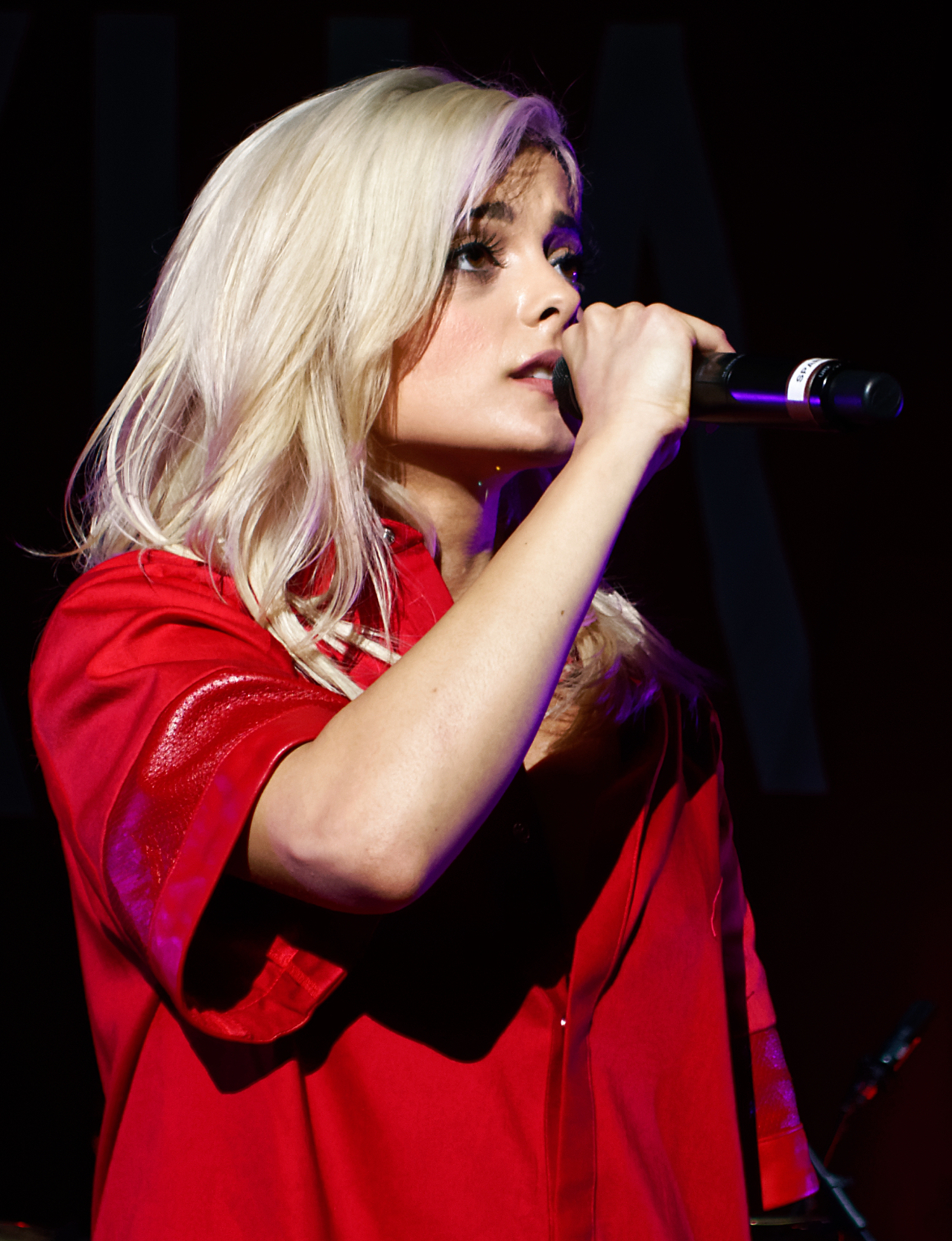
Bebe Rexha

- Eddie Rabbitt (1941–1998) – singer-songwriter
- Rack-Lo – rapper and author
- Marky Ramone (born 1956) – drummer of the punk band The Ramones
- Anthony Ramos (born 1991) – actor, singer-songwriter (Bushwick)
- Keith Raniere (born 1960) – cult leader who co-founded NXIVM
- Arlene Raven (1944–2006) – art historian, author, critic, educator, and curator
- Florence Ravenel (1896–1975) – actress; born in Minnesota, raised in Brooklyn
- Larry Ray (born 1959) – criminal convicted of sex trafficking, extortion, forced labor, and other offenses, sentenced to 60 years in prison
- Domenic Recchia (born 1959) – attorney and politician
- Lou Reed (1942–2013) – singer-songwriter
- Paul Regina (1956–2006) – actor
- Jerry Reinsdorf (born 1936) – sports executive and businessman
- Odd Kristian Reme (1953–2024) – priest and politician
- Leah Remini (born 1970) – actress (Bensonhurst)
- Barbara Res – attorney, author, and engineer
- Bebe Rexha (born 1989) – singer-songwriter and record producer
- Dorothy P. Rice (1922–2017) – health statistician
- Ed Rice (1918–2001) – author, publisher, photojournalist and painter
- Buddy Rich (1917–1987) – drummer and big-band leader
- Elsie Richardson (1922–2012) – community activist and civil servant
- Adam Richman – actor, host of reality-television series Man vs. Food
- Thomas Ridgway – U.S. Army officer and father of General Matthew Ridgway
- Henry Riecken (1917–2012) – psychologist
- Heinrich Ries (1871–1951) – economic geologist
- Joan Rivers (1933–2014) – comedian
- Phil Rizzuto (1917–2007) – Major League Baseball player and broadcaster
- Saul Robbins (1922–2010) – toy manufacturer and co-founder of Remco
- Warren Delano Robbins (1885–1935) – diplomat
- Mary Fanton Roberts (1864–1956) – journalist, writer
- Jackie Robinson – Major League Baseball player and pioneer, Brooklyn Dodgers
- Dorothy Robins-Mowry (1921–2021) – diplomat and writer
- Chris Rock (born 1965) – actor and comedian (Bedford–Stuyvesant)
- Tony Rock (born 1974) – actor and comedian (Bedford–Stuyvesant)
- Fred J. Rode (1896–1971) – Academy Award-nominated set director
- Jessamyn Rodriguez – social entrepreneur, educator, and hospitality executive
- John Raphael Rogers (1856–1934) – inventor of the Typograph
- Steve Rogers (born 1920) – fictional superhero, federal official, intelligence operative, former soldier
- Mortimer Rogoff (1921–2008) – inventor and businessman
- Saul Rogovin (1923–1995) – Major League Baseball pitcher
- Stan Rogow (1948–2023) – music manager, writer, and producer of film and television
- Roget Romain (born 1966) – executive, producer, entertainment manager and entrepreneur
- Edward A. Romano – entertainment executive
- Mickey Rooney (1920–2014) – five-time Oscar-nominated actor
- Daisy Rosario – public radio personality and producer
- Max Rose (born 1986) – military officer and politician who served as a United States representative from New York
- Mike Rosen (born 1944) – radio talk show host and newspaper columnist
- Aaron "Rosy" Rosenberg (1912–1979) – two-time "All-American" college football player, and film and television producer
- Harold Rosenberg (1906–1978) – writer, educator, philosopher and art critic
- Jerry Rosenberg – television personality
- Philip Rosenberg (born 1935) – Academy Award winning production designer and art director
- Wayne Rosenthal (born 1965) – Major League Baseball pitcher and coach (Canarsie)
- Spencer Ross (born 1940) – sportscaster
- Steve Ross (1927–1992) – chairman of Time Warner
- Angela Carlozzi Rossi (1901–1977) – social worker
- Mark Roth (born 1951) – bowler
- Julian Rotter (1916–2014) – psychologist known for developing social learning theory
- Rowdy Rebel (born 1991) – rapper from GS9 (East Flatbush)
- Herbert H. Rowen (1916–1999) – historian
- Essie Wick Rowland (1871–1957) – socialite
- Jeff Rubens (born 1941) – bridge player, editor, and writer
- Cyma Rubin (born 1926) – producer, writer, and director
- Ed Rubinoff (born 1935) – tennis player
- David Rubinson (born 1942) – recording engineer and music producer
- Rudi (1928–1973) – spiritual teacher
- David Ruggerio (born 1962) – chef
- Chris Rush (born 1946) – stand-up comedian
- Brenda Russell (born 1949) – singer
- Sam Rutigliano (born 1933) – football coach
- Carl Hancock Rux – writer, actor, and director (Fort Greene)
- RZA (born 1969) – rapper

== S ==
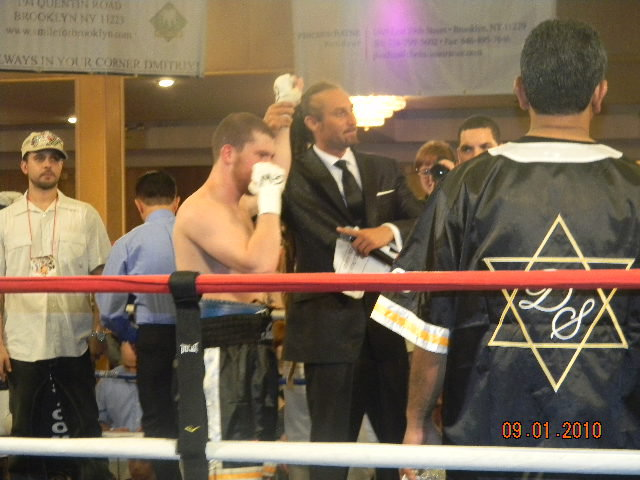
Dmitri Salita

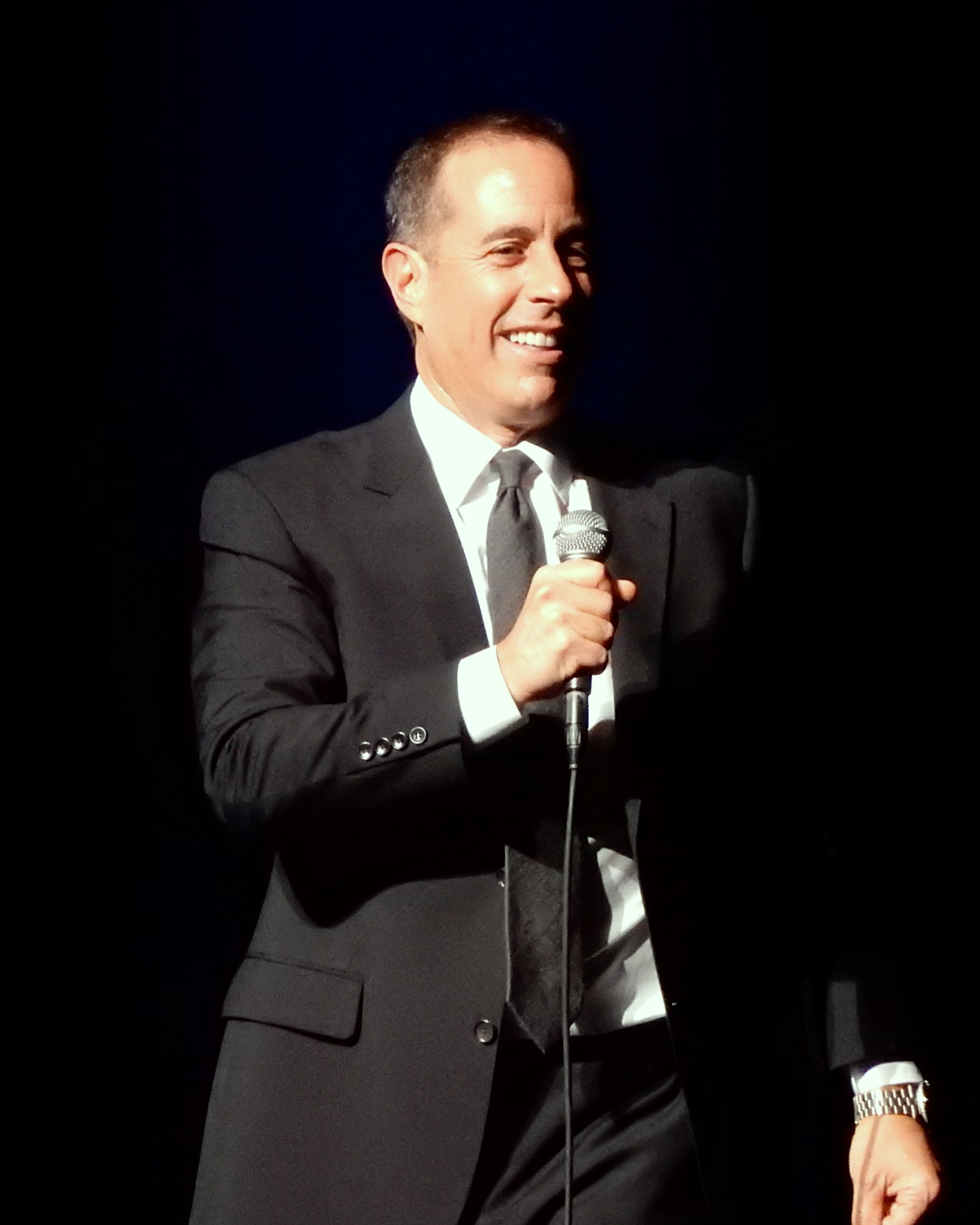
Jerry Seinfeld

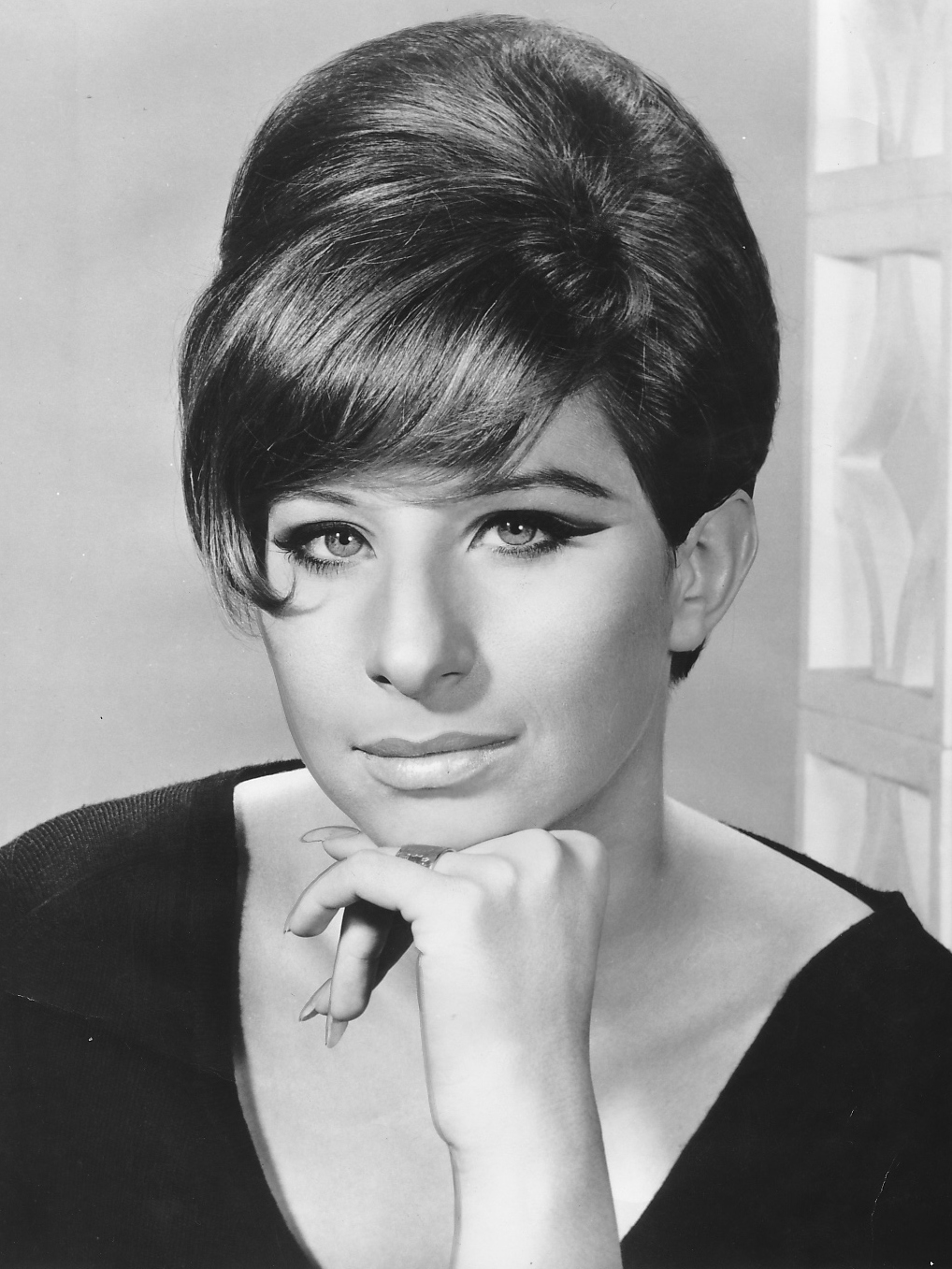
Barbra Streisand

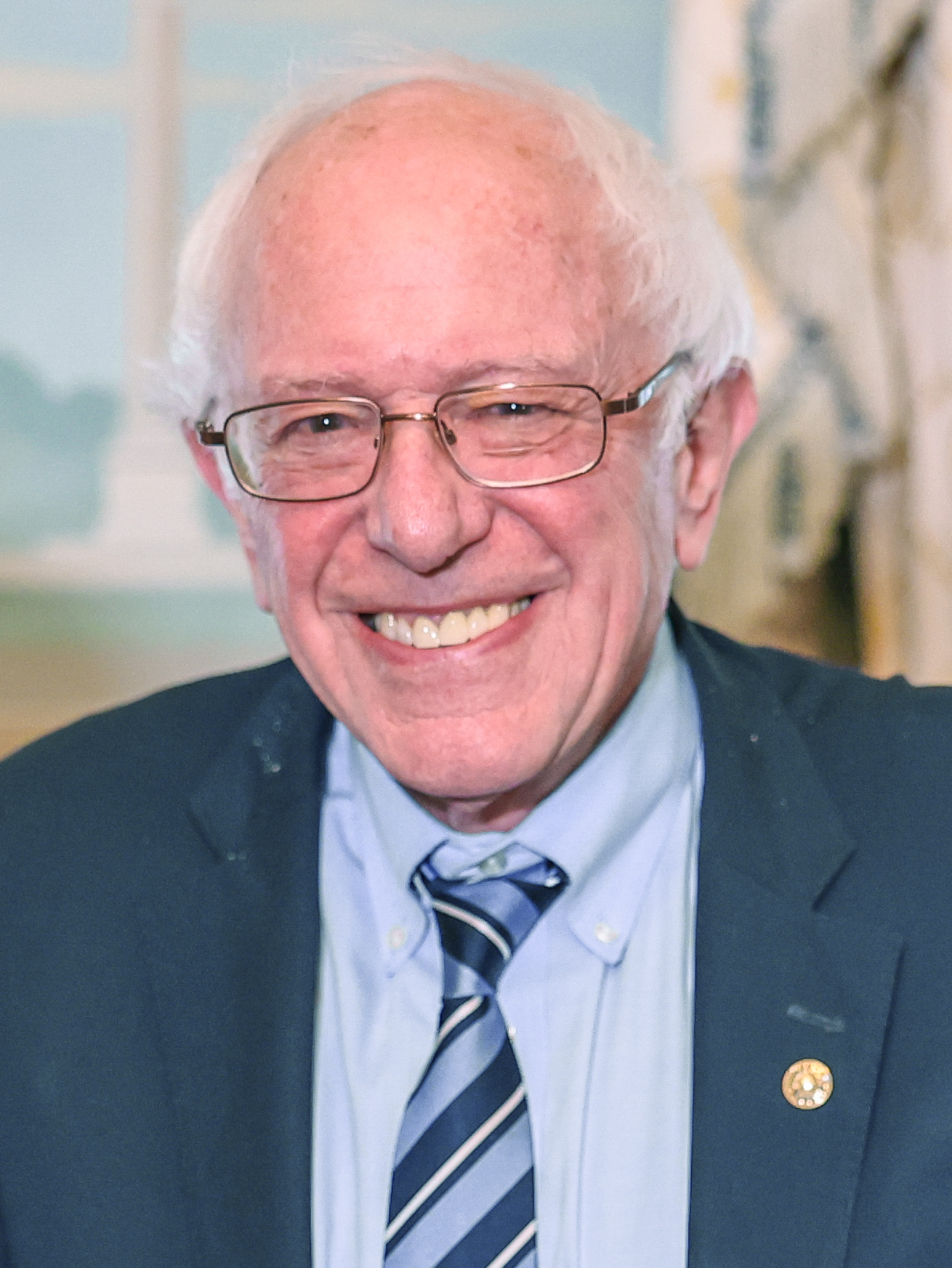
Bernie Sanders

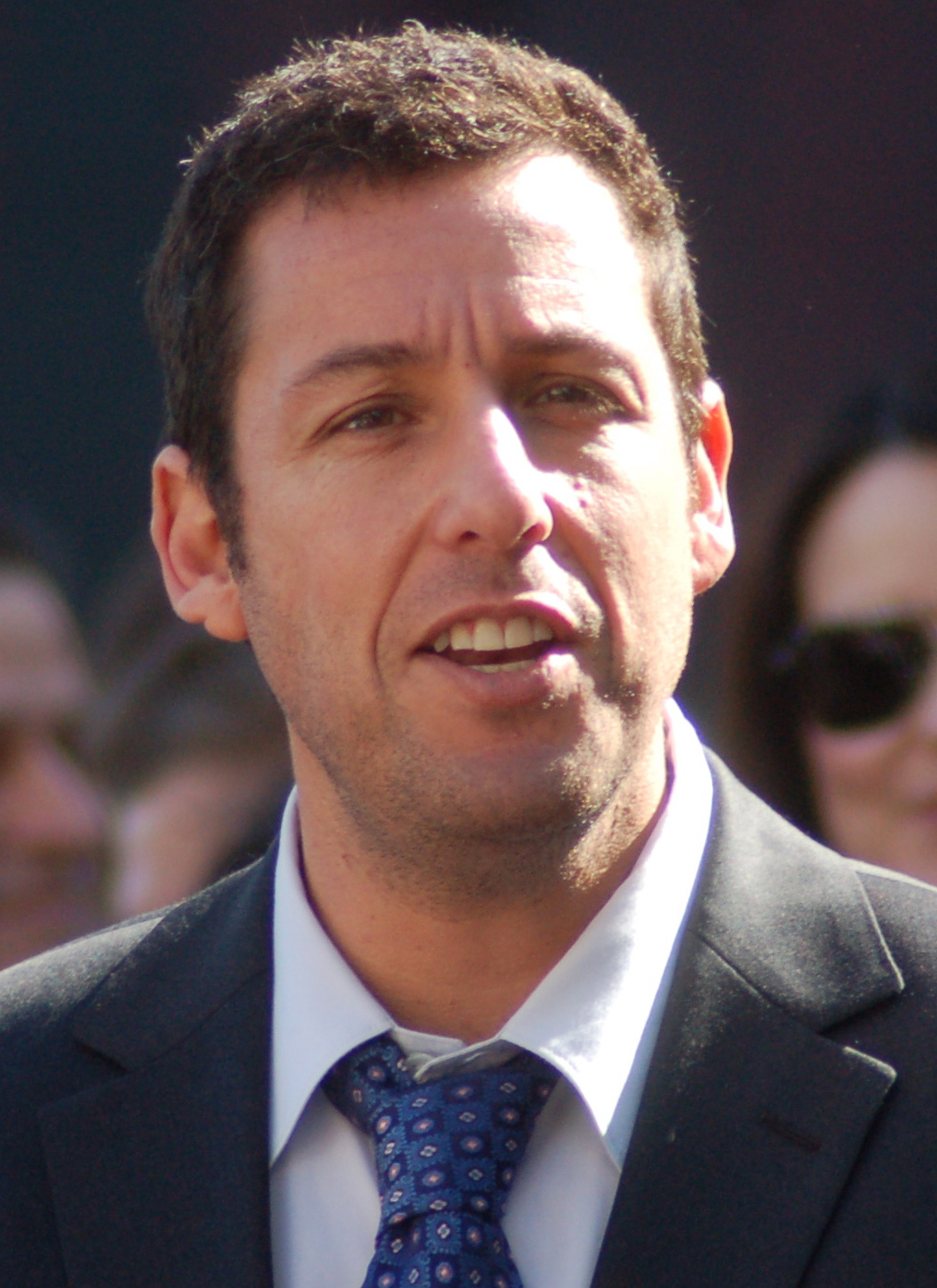
Adam Sandler

- Jonathan Safran Foer (born 1977) – novelist
- Carl Sagan (1934–1996) – scientist, author, educator (Bensonhurst)
- Saigon (born 1977) – actor and rapper
- Stephanie Saland – ballet dancer and teacher
- Claudia Peña Salinas (born 1975) – artist
- Dmitri Salita (born 1982) – boxer
- William Salter (1821–1910) – minister, public orator, social activist, and historian
- Arnold A. Saltzman (1916–2014) – businessman, diplomat, art collector, and philanthropist
- John Samuelsen (born 1967 or 1968) – labor union leader
- Julia Sand (1848–1933) – letter writer who corresponded with President Chester A. Arthur
- Bernie Sanders (born 1941) – Independent U.S. senator from Vermont (Madison)
- Jane Sanders (born 1950) – social worker, college administrator, activist, and political strategist
- Adam Sandler (born 1966) – actor and comedian
- Evie Sands (born 1946) – singer-songwriter and musician
- Betty Santoro (1938–2005) – educator, activist and community leader
- Porter Sargent (1872–1951) – educational theorist and critic
- Peter Sarsgaard (born 1971) – actor
- Lois Sasson (1940–2020) – jewelry designer and gay rights activist
- Brittney Savage (born 1987) – professional wrestler
- Viola Savoy (1899–1987) – actress
- Leo Schachter (1924–2019) – diamond manufacturer
- Roger Schank (1946–2023) – education reformer, artificial-intelligence expert
- Kenny Scharf (born 1958) – graffiti artist
- Ossie Schectman (1919–2013) – NBA basketball guard
- Robert Scherrer (1935–1995) – FBI agent
- Thomas D. Schiano (born 1962) – organ-transplantation specialist
- Vincent Schiavelli (1948–2005) − actor, food writer
- Phil Schiliro (born 1956) – political consultant and strategist
- Justin G. Schiller (born 1943) – bookseller
- Vincent Schiraldi (born 1959) – juvenile justice policy reformer and activist
- Steve Schirripa (born 1957) – actor (Bensonhurst)
- Harvey Schlossberg (1936–2021) – psychoanalyst, police officer, and founder of modern crisis negotiation
- Michael Schlow – chef and restaurateur
- Ruth A. M. Schmidt (1916–2014) – geologist and paleontologist
- Tobias Schneebaum (1922–2005) – artist, anthropologist, and AIDS activist
- Robert Scholes (1929–2016) – literary critic and theorist
- Andre-Michel Schub (born 1952) – pianist (Midwood)
- Peter C. Schultz (born 1942) – co-inventor of fiber optics
- Chuck Schumer (born 1950) – U.S. senator from New York (Flatbush)
- Alan Schwartz – businessman; executive chairman of Guggenheim Partners
- Gary Schwartz (born 1940) – art historian
- Ylon Schwartz – chessmaster
- Joseph E. Schwartzberg (1928–2018) – writer, academic, and peace activist
- Seymour Schwartzman (1930–2009) – opera singer and cantor
- Chris Matthew Sciabarra (born 1960) – political theorist
- Brian Scolaro (born 1973) – comedian, actor, voice-over actor and author
- Raymond Scott (born Harry Warnow, 1908–1994) – composer, bandleader, pianist, electronic-music pioneer
- Samuel R. Scottron (1841–1905) – inventor and engineer
- John Scully (1846–1917) – Jesuit priest and president of Fordham University
- Neil Sedaka (1939–2026) – singer-songwriter
- Alice Wiley Seay (1858–1937) – social worker and founder of the Empire State Federation of Women's Clubs
- Alonzo Bertram See (1849–1941) – businessman
- Murray Seeman (1914–2017) – lawyer and real estate developer
- Erich Segal (1937–2010) – author, Academy Award-nominated screenwriter, and educator (Midwood)
- Hugh Seidman (1940–2023) – poet
- Steven Seifert (1950–2022) – medical toxicologist
- Jerry Seinfeld (born 1954) – actor and comedian (Borough Park)
- Matt Zoller Seitz (born 1968) – film and television critic, author and filmmaker
- Hubert Selby, Jr. (1928–2004) – author
- Cletus Seldin (born 1986) – boxer
- Phil Sellers (1953–2023) – NBA player
- Irene Mayer Selznick (1907–1990) – socialite and theatrical producer
- George I. Seney (1826–1893) – banker, art collector, and philanthropist
- Greg Serano (born 1974) – actor
- Frank Serpico (born 1936) – New York Police Department detective and whistleblower
- John Severin (1921–2012) – comics artist
- Marie Severin (1929–2018) – comics artist and colorist
- Shabazz the Disciple (born 1973) – rapper (Red Hook)
- William Shadish (1949–2016) – psychologist and statistician
- Ruth Shafer (1912 –1972) – engineer
- Juliet Popper Shaffer (born 1932) – psychologist and statistician
- Neal Shapiro (born 1945) – equestrian and Olympic medalist
- Judy Shapiro-Ikenberry (born 1942) – long-distance runner
- Francis Ethelbert Sharkey – fictional character played by Terry Becker in the 1964–68 ABC television series Voyage to the Bottom of the Sea
- Judith Sheindlin (born 1942) – television personality, Judge Judy (Madison / Bedford–Stuyvesant)
- Lawrence L. Shenfield (1891–1974) – advertising executive
- Allie Sherman (1923–2015) – NFL player and coach
- Art Sherman (born 1937) – horse trainer and jockey
- Fred Sherman (1924–2009) – economist and business commentator
- Jerome K. Sherman (1925–2023) – biologist and founder of modern sperm banking and cryopreservation
- Bobby Shmurda (born 1994) – rapper from GS9 (East Flatbush)
- Lester Shorr (1907–1992) – cinematographer
- Marjorie Shostak (1945–1996) – anthropologist
- Michael Showalter (born 1970) – actor and comedian
- Shyne (born Jamal Michael Barrow; 1978), Belizean rapper and politician
- Gabourey Sidibe (born 1983) – actress (Bedford–Stuyvesant)
- Bugsy Siegel (1906–1947) – gangster
- Jill Sigman – choreographer and dancer
- Raymond Siller (born 1939) – television writer, political consultant
- Beverly Sills (1929–2007) – opera singer
- Dean Silvers – film director, film producer, screenwriter, and author (East Flatbush)
- Phil Silvers (1911–1985) – actor and comedian
- John Sitaras (born 1972) – fitness professional
- David Sive (1922–2014) – attorney, environmentalist, and professor of environmental law
- Skoob – half of rap duo Das EFX
- Justine Skye (born 1995) – singer-songwriter, dancer and model
- Harold S. Sloan (1888–1988) – economist
- Buzz Slutzky (born 1988) – artist, writer, educator, and performer
- Peer Smed (1878–1943) – silversmith
- Smif-n-Wessun – hip-hop duo
- Frank H. Smith – media executive and producer
- Lois Smith (1928–2012) – publicist
- Lucy Eaton Smith (1845–1894) – nun
- Munroe Smith (1854–1926) – jurist and historian
- Philip F. Smith (1932–2017) – Master Chief Petty Officer of the Coast Guard
- Sanford L. Smith (1939–2024) – businessman
- Jimmy Smits (born 1955) – actor
- Stephen Edward Smith (1927–1990) – financial analyst and political strategist who was the husband of Jean Kennedy Smith
- Pop Smoke (1999–2020) – rapper (Canarsie)
- Joel Smoller (1936–2017) – mathematician
- Culver C. Sniffen (1844–1930) – Paymaster-General of the United States Army
- Ralph Snyderman (born 1940) – physician, scientist, administrator (Bensonhurst)
- Robert Solow (1924–2023) – economist; winner of the Nobel Memorial Prize in Economic Sciences (Madison)
- Lee Solters (1919–2009) – press agent
- Gilbert Sorrentino (1929–2006) – novelist, short story writer, poet, literary critic, and editor
- Paul Sorvino (1939–2022) – actor
- Carl Søyland (1894–1978) – editor-in-chief of Nordisk Tidende
- Paul Spatola – musician
- Mortimer Spiegelman (1901–1969) – statistician
- Michael Spiller (born 1961) – cinematographer and television director
- DJ Spinderella (born 1971) – DJ and rapper
- William F. Spurgin (1838–1904) – US Army brigadier general, lived in Brooklyn during retirement
- Lamuel A. Stanislaus (1921–2016) – dentist and diplomat
- Jessie Stanton (1887–1976) – writer
- Barbara Stanwyck (1907–1990) – Oscar-winning actress
- Adele Starr (1920–2010) – activist
- Peter Steele (1962–2010) – bassist and singer (Type O Negative, Carnivore) (Midwood)
- Charles M. Stein (1920–2016) – statistician and academic
- Seymour Stein (1942–2023) – entrepreneur and music executive
- Norman Steinberg (1939–2023) – television director, producer and screenwriter
- Douglas C. Steiner (born 1960) – real estate developer
- Gilbert Y. Steiner (1924–2006) – scholar and president of the Brookings Institution
- Charles Stendig (1924–2024) – businessman and philanthropist
- Gary Stephan (born 1942) – artist
- Lance Stephenson (born 1990) – basketball player
- Ray Stern (1933–2007) – professional wrestler, bodybuilder and entrepreneur
- Stuart Sternberg (born 1959) – owner of the Tampa Bay Rays
- Connie Stevens (born 1938) – actress and singer
- Neil M. Stevenson (1930–2009) – chief of chaplains of the U.S. Navy
- Bob Stewart (1920–2012) – television producer
- Sticky Fingaz (born 1973), born Kirk Jones, member of the rap group Onyx
- Jerry Stiller (1927–2020) – actor, father of Ben Stiller
- Lulu G. Stillman (1881 or 1882–1969) – activist for Native American rights
- Frederick A. Stokes (1857–1939) – publisher
- David Stones (born 1988) – rapper
- Ruth Storey (1913–1997) – actress
- Jeff Strabone – scholar, political activist and civic leader
- Granville Straker (born 1939) – music businessman and record producer
- Evelyn Straus (1916–1992) – photojournalist
- Barbra Streisand (born 1942) – Oscar-winning actress, singer, director, political activist (Williamsburg)
- Eric Stuart (born 1967) – voice actor, voice director, musician, singer and songwriter
- Ray Suarez (born 1957) – journalist (Bensonhurst)
- Jason Sudeikis (born 1975) – actor and comedian (Clinton Hill)
- Daniel Suhr (1964–2001) – first firefighter to die in the September 11 attacks
- Jackie Summers – microdistiller, writer and chief executive officer of Jack from Brooklyn
- Laura Sumner (1921–1993) – numismatist and poet
- Rowena Swanson (born 1928) – information scientist
- Glenn Switkes (1951–2009) – environmentalist and film-maker
- Richard Sylbert (1928–2002) – film production designer and art director
- Harold Syrett (1913–1984) – president of Brooklyn College

== T ==
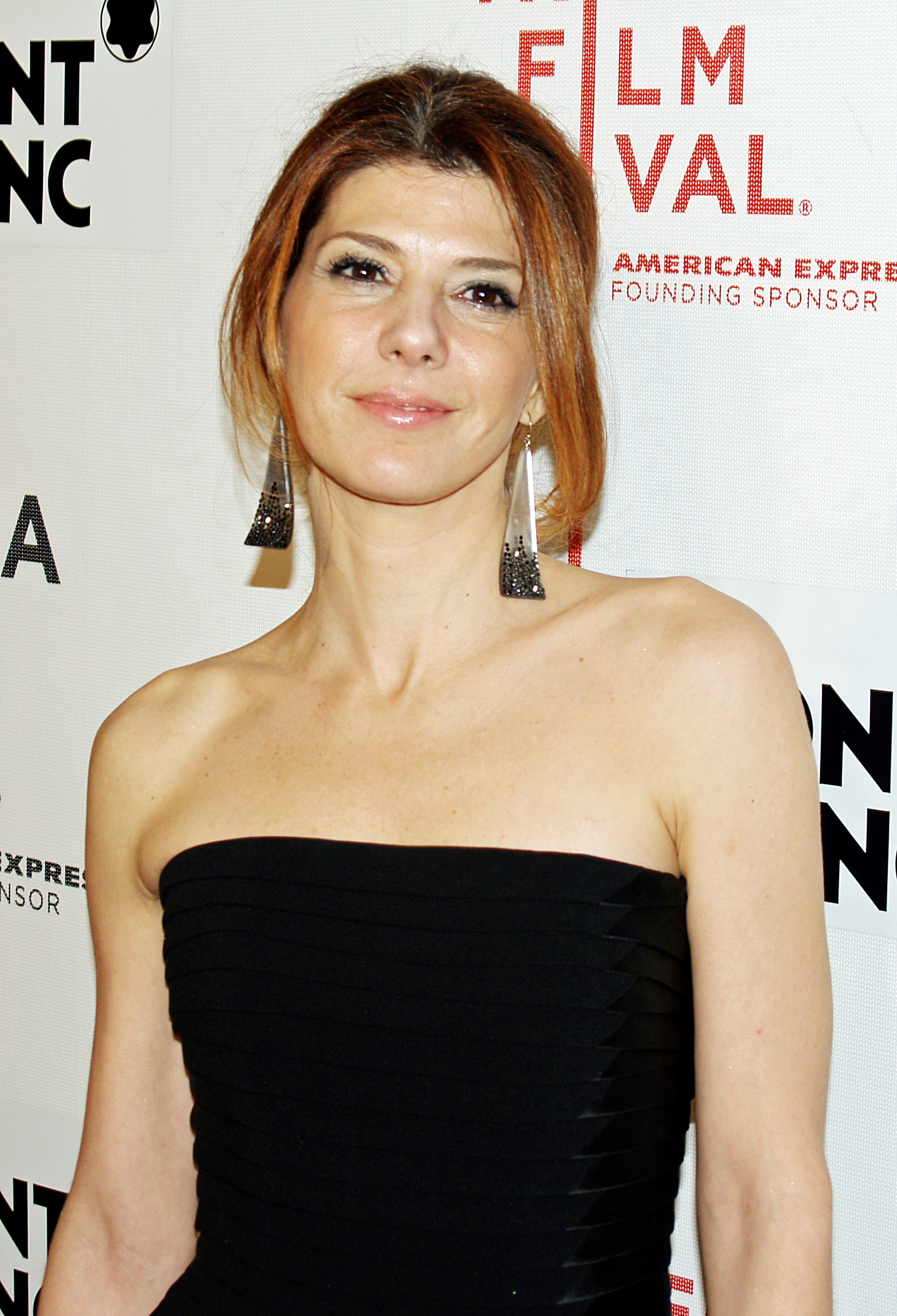
Marisa Tomei

- Gregory Tague (born 1957) – literary scholar
- Nancy Tang (born 1943) – diplomat
- Sid Tannenbaum (1925–1986) – professional basketball player
- Yanki Tauber (born 1965) – scholar, rabbi, writer and editor
- Irving Taylor (1914–1983) – composer, lyricist, and screenwriter
- Tazz (born 1967) – ring name of Peter Senerchia, former professional wrestler
- Sebastian Telfair (born 1985) – NBA player
- Frank Terpil (1939–2016) – CIA agent and American defector
- Robert Terzuola (born 1944) – knife maker
- Roy M. Terry (1915–1988) – Chief of Chaplains of the U.S. Air Force
- Leon Thomas III (born 1993) – singer, songwriter, musician, record producer and actor.
- Tanisha Thomas (born 1985) – reality television participant, television show host
- Gale Thomson (1919–2010) – businesswoman and activist
- John Threat (born 1973) – computer hacker
- Yosel Tiefenbrun – tailor and rabbi
- Frank Tieri (1904–1981) – mobster
- Ira Tiffen (born 1951) – optics designer and glass artist
- Adrianne Tolsch (1938–2016) – comedian, writer and graphic artist
- Sy Tomashoff (1922–2019) – television production designer and set decorator
- Marisa Tomei (born 1964) – Oscar-winning actress
- Jacob Toppin (born 2000) – basketball player in the Israeli Basketball Premier League, formerly in the NBA
- Ronn Torossian (born 1974) – public relations executive
- Joe Torre (born 1940) – Major League Baseball player, New York Yankees and Los Angeles Dodgers manager, Hall of Fame (Marine Park)
- Frank Tousey (1853–1902) – publisher
- Isaac Toussie (born 1972) – real estate developer
- Rachel Trachtenburg (born 1993) – actress, singer, musician (Bushwick)
- Spencer Trask (1844–1909) – financier, philanthropist, and venture capitalist
- Warren Lincoln Travis (1876–1941) – weightlifter
- Mimi Trepel (1908–2006) – radio broadcaster
- Kathy Troccoli (born 1955) – gospel singer
- Kevin M. Tucker (1940–2012) – Commissioner of Philadelphia Police Department
- Richard Tucker (1884–1942) – actor
- Marcia Tucker (1940–2006) – art historian, art critic and curator
- Florence Tullis (1936–2006) – mother of Roy L. Dennis who was portrayed by Cher in the 1985 film Mask
- Kenneth Turan (born 1946) – film critic and writer
- Mark Turenshine (1944–2016) – American-Israeli basketball player
- John Turturro (born 1957) – actor and director
- Nicholas Turturro (born 1962) – actor
- Mike Tyson (born 1966) – heavyweight boxing champion

== U ==
- Uncle Murda (born 1980) – gangster rapper (East New York)
- Adelaide Underhill (1860–1936) – librarian
- Daniel Oscar Underhill (1845–1929) – banker
- Barbara Underwood (1932–2025) – politician
- UTFO – 1980s rap group

== V ==
- Francis R. Valeo (1916–2006) – 21st Secretary of the United States Senate
- Lou Vairo (born 1945) – ice hockey coach and inductee into the United States Hockey Hall of Fame
- Isaac Van Anden (1812–1875) – newspaper publisher and founder of the Brooklyn Eagle
- Mary Crowell Van Benschoten (1840–1921) – author, newspaper publisher, clubwoman
- Charles H. Van Brunt (1835–1905) – lawyer and judge
- Vincent Van Brunt (1944–2026) – chemical engineer
- Willard Van der Veer (1894–1963) – Academy Award-winning cinematographer
- Paul Van Dyke (1859–1933) – historian
- Frank P. Van Pelt (1861–1942) – Sandy Hook Pilot
- Andrew VanWyngarden (born 1983) – member of MGMT
- Alan Veingrad (born 1963) – NFL player
- Nydia Velázquez (born 1953 – U.S. congresswoman, former New York City Councilor
- Guido Verbeck (1830–1898) – political advisor, educator, and missionary
- Dylan Verrechia (born 1976) – film director, producer, and screenwriter
- Edward Verso (born 1941) – dancer and choreographer
- Edward Vick (born 1944) – former CEO of Young & Rubicam
- Idara Victor – actress
- Abe Vigoda (1921–2016) – actor
- Pat Villani (1954–2011) – computer programmer
- Sal Villanueva – record producer
- Tony Visconti (born 1944) – musician, producer
- Joseph Volpe (born 1940) – manager of the Metropolitan Opera
- Thomas von Essen (born 1945) – New York City Fire Commissioner

== W ==
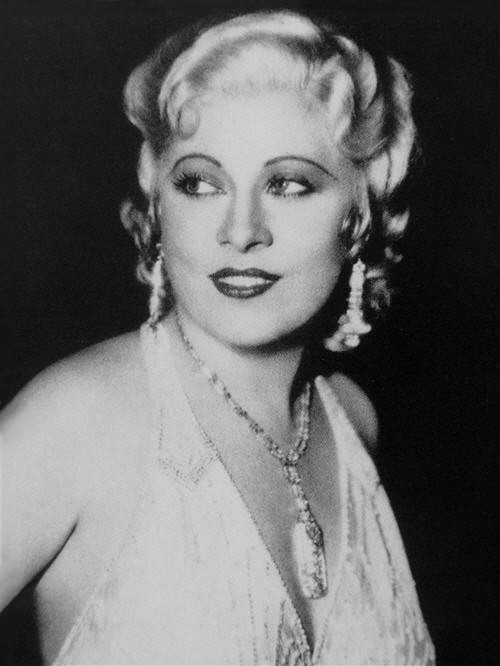
Mae West

- Theodore Wachs (born 1941) – psychologist and academic
- Larry Wachtel (1930–2007) – banker and radio personality
- Siraj Wahhaj (born 1950) – imam and Muslim activist
- Edward T. Wailes (1903–1969) – diplomat and lawyer
- A. E. Waite (1857–1942) – poet and mystic
- Kaci Walfall (born 2004) – actress
- Andre Walker (born 1965), designer
- Eli Wallach (1915–2014) – actor
- John C. Walsh – film director and screenwriter
- William B. Walsh (1920–1996) – founder of Project HOPE (USA)
- Rosalind P. Walter (1924–2020) – philanthropist and humanities advocate
- Esraa Warda – Algerian-American dance performer and educator
- Elizabeth von Till Warren (1934–2021) – historian and preservationist
- Kenneth S. Warren (1929–1996) – scientist and physician
- Sydnee Washington – comedian and actress
- Isabel Bassett Wasson (1897–1994) – petroleum geologist and Yellowstone National Park ranger
- Timothy Weah (born 2000) – soccer player
- Susan Weber (born 1954) – historian
- Elizur G. Webster (1829–1900) – silversmith
- Sanford I. Weill (born 1933) – banker, financier, and philanthropist
- Sidney Weinberg (1891–1969) – banker who led Goldman Sachs
- Sylvia Weinstock (1930–2021) – baker and cake decorator
- Shatzi Weisberger (1930–2022) – nurse, activist, and death educator
- Mickey Welch (1859–1941) – MLB player
- Beatrice Welters (born 1951) – U.S. Ambassador to Trinidad and Tobago
- Harold Wenstrom (1893–1944) – cinematographer
- Mae West (1893–1980) – actress, playwright, and comedian (Williamsburg/Greenpoint)
- West Dakota – drag queen
- Arthur H. Westing (1928–2020) – ecologist
- Randy Weston (1926–2018) – pianist and composer
- Jitu Weusi (1939–2013) – educator, activist, and co-founder of the National Black United Front
- Michael Jai White (born 1967) – actor
- Alfred Tredway White (1846–1921) – housing reformer and philanthropist known as "Brooklyn's first citizen"
- Frank Russell White (1889–1961) – architect
- Nancy White (1916–2002) – editor of Harper's Bazaar
- Stanley Hart White (1891–1979) – landscape architect and educator
- Colson Whitehead (born 1969) – novelist and MacArthur Fellow
- Isaiah Whitehead (born 1995) – basketball player for the Brooklyn Nets (NBA), now in the Israeli Basketball Premier League
- Laura Whitehorn (born 1945) – activist and participant in the 1983 United States Senate bombing
- Walt Whitman (1819–1892) – poet, best known for Leaves of Grass; journalist and Brooklyn Eagle editor; essayist and humanist
- Theodore Whitmarsh (1869–1936) – businessman and politician
- Whodini – 1980s rap group
- Oscar Widmann (1888–1961) – interior designer and co-founder of the American Institute of Designers
- William H. Willcox (1832–1929) – architect
- Olivia Wilde (born 1984) – actress (Clinton Hill)
- Maya Wiley (born 1964) – lawyer, professor, and civil rights activist
- Julia Willebrand (1933–2023) – environmental and peace activist
- Jerry Williams (1923–2003) – radio host
- Michael K. Williams (1966–2021) – actor
- Michelle Williams (born 1980) – actress
- Phyllis Williams Lehmann (1912–2004) – archaeologist
- Tracy Williams (born 1988) – professional wrestler
- Jeff Wilpon (born 1961) – businessman and owner of the New York Excelsior
- Jan Wilsgaard (1930–2016) – chief automotive designer, Volvo Cars, 1950–1990
- Robert Anton Wilson (1932–2007) – author
- Amelia Kempshall Wing (1837–1927) – author and philanthropist
- John Winslow (1825–1898) – lawyer
- Shelley Winters (1920–2006) – Oscar-winning actress
- Joel-Peter Witkin (born 1939) – photographer
- Bertram Wolfe (1896–1977) – biographer and writer on communism
- Paula Wolfert (born 1938) – cookbook author, specialist in Mediterranean cuisines
- Milton Wolff (1915–2008) – writer and veteran of the Spanish Civil War
- Wolfman Jack (1938–1995) – 1970s disc jockey
- Paul Wolfowitz (born 1943) – political scientist and diplomat
- Theresa Wolfson (1897–1972) – labor economist and educator
- Lloyd R. Woodson (born 1966) – arrested in 2010 with military-grade weapons and a detailed map of the Fort Drum military installation
- John B. Woodward (1835–1899) – Adjutant General of New York
- Georgeanna Woolsey (1833–1906) – writer and nurse
- Harold Wren (1921–2016) – dean of three law schools
- Lee Wulff (1905–1991) – artist, pilot, fly fisherman, author, filmmaker, outfitter and conservationist
- Tony Wyllie (born 1967) – sports executive

== Y ==
- Robert D. Yates (1857–1885) – medical doctor and checkers player
- Jean R. Yawkey (1909–1992) – owner of the Boston Red Sox
- Adam Yauch (1964–2012) – rapper, founding member of the Beastie Boys
- Kalman Yeger (born 1974) – politician
- Janet Yellen (born 1946) – economist and U.S. secretary of the treasury
- James Harvey Young (1915–2006) – social historian
- Henny Youngman (1906–1998) – comedian and violinist

== Z ==
- Dov S. Zakheim (born 1948) – businessman, writer, and US government official
- Walter Zanger (1935–2015) – author and television personality
- Frank Zarb (born 1935) – businessman and politician
- Max Zaslofsky (1925–1985) – NBA guard/forward, one-time FT% leader, one-time points leader, All-Star, ABA coach
- Carl Zimmerman (born 1939) – theatre producer and talent agent
- Zombie Juice (born 1990) – rapper (Flatbush)
- Shirley Zussman (1914–2021) – sex therapist
- Shlomo Zev Zweigenhaft (1915–2005) – rabbi

== See also ==
- List of artists who have resided in Brooklyn
- List of people from New York City
  - List of people from the Bronx
  - List of people from Queens
  - List of people from Staten Island
