= Yonnette Fleming =

American urban farmer (born 1968)

- Born: 1968 (age 57–58); Guyana
- Occupation: Urban farmer
- Known for: Food justice

Yonnette Fleming (born 1968) is an American urban farmer and community earth steward based in Bedford–Stuyvesant, Brooklyn. Fleming is part of the environmental movement, her work focusing on urban community gardens and black farmers.

== Early life ==
Yonnette Fleming was born in Guyana. Her family worked with indigenous communities, growing coconuts, sugar, rice, and other crops. She immigrated to New York in 1983 from Georgetown, Guyana.

== Career ==
Yonnette Fleming joined Hattie Carthan Community Garden, located at Marcy and Lafayette in Brooklyn's Bedford-Stuyvesant neighborhood, in 2003 while working on Wall Street. In 2008, she left her Wall Street job in order to commit to herself to community resilience and food. In 2009, after an "uphill battle" with the city, she established the Hattie Carthan Community Farmer’s Market in a reclaimed lot next to the main garden. In 2010, along with Karen Washington, Fleming cofounded Farm School NYC as an educational hub to "teach community members how to create their own localized food systems".

Fleming is currently the vice president of the Hattie Carthan Community Garden and her work addresses food security and food justice concerns. She teaches inter-generational workshops including cooking, urban farming, herbalism, and plant medicine while focusing on the needs of the community. Within her workshops, she calls on participants to think on how structures of oppression have impacted their own lives and how to confront them.

Fleming is also a member of the Farm School's advisory board where she teaches a food justice course. In addition to her work as a food advocate, Fleming is an ordained minister, plant and sound medicine practitioner, reiki master, and herbalist. Fleming sees farm work "an essential part of healing from the trauma of racism". She cites several students she has taught going on to create action groups in their local schools to discuss food sovereignty.

== See also ==
- Food Justice Movement
