= Bedford–Stuyvesant, Brooklyn =

Neighborhood in New York City

Bedford–Stuyvesant
- Neighborhood of Brooklyn
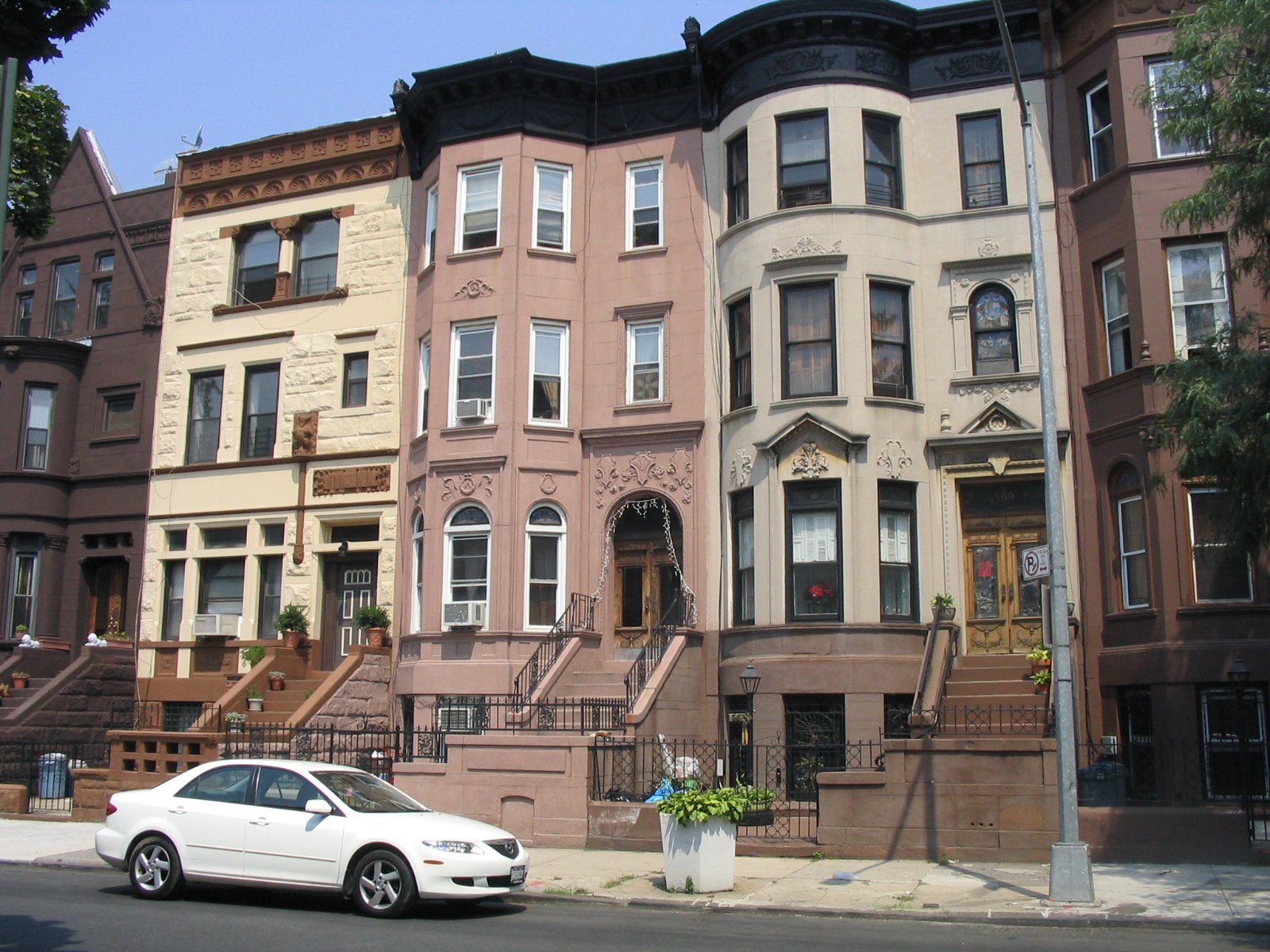
- Nicknames: Bed–Stuy, Do or Die
- Interactive map of Bedford–Stuyvesant
- Coordinates: 40.687°N 73.941°W
- Country: United States
- State: New York
- City: New York City
- Borough: Brooklyn
- Community District: Brooklyn 3

Area
  - Total: 2.8 sq mi (7.3 km^{2})

Population (2024)
  - Total: 181,949
  - Density: 65,000/sq mi (25,000/km^{2})

Ethnicity
  - Black: 38.3%
  - White: 33.4%
  - Hispanic: 18.1%
  - Asian: 4.6%
  - Others: 5.7%

Economics
  - Median income: $71,123
- Time zone: UTC−5 (Eastern)
  - Summer (DST): UTC−4 (EDT)
- ZIP Codes: 11205, 11206, 11216, 11221, 11233, 11238
- Area code: 718, 347, 929, and 917

Bedford–Stuyvesant (/ˌbɛdfərd ˈstaɪvəsənt/ BED-fərd STY-və-sənt), colloquially known as Bed–Stuy, is a neighborhood in the northern section of the New York City borough of Brooklyn. It is bounded by Flushing Avenue to the north (bordering Williamsburg), Classon Avenue to the west (bordering Clinton Hill), Broadway to the east (bordering Bushwick and East New York), and Atlantic Avenue to the south (bordering Crown Heights and Brownsville). The main shopping street, Fulton Street, runs east–west the length of the neighborhood and intersects high-traffic north–south streets including Bedford Avenue, Nostrand Avenue, and Stuyvesant Avenue. Bedford–Stuyvesant contains four smaller neighborhoods: Bedford, Stuyvesant Heights, Ocean Hill, and Weeksville (also part of Crown Heights). Part of Clinton Hill was once considered part of Bedford–Stuyvesant.

Bedford–Stuyvesant has the largest collection of intact and largely untouched Victorian architecture in the United States, with roughly 8,800 buildings built before 1900. Its building stock includes many historic brownstones, developed for the expanding upper-middle class from the 1890s to the late 1910s. They contain highly ornamental detailing throughout their interiors and have classical architectural elements, such as brackets, quoins, fluting, finials, and elaborate frieze and cornice banding.

Since the late 1930s, the neighborhood has been a major cultural center for Brooklyn's African-American population. Following the construction of the Fulton Street subway line (A and C trains) in 1936, African Americans left an overcrowded Harlem for greater housing availability in Bedford–Stuyvesant. From Bedford–Stuyvesant, African Americans have since moved into the surrounding areas of Brooklyn, such as East New York, Crown Heights, Brownsville, and Fort Greene. Since the early 2000s, Bedford–Stuyvesant has undergone significant gentrification, resulting in a dramatic demographic shift combined with increasing rent and real-estate prices.

Bedford–Stuyvesant is mostly part of Brooklyn Community District 3. Its primary ZIP Codes are 11205, 11206, 11216, 11221, 11233, and 11238. Bedford–Stuyvesant is patrolled by the 79th and 81st Precincts of the New York City Police Department. Politically it is represented by the New York City Council's 36th District.

== History ==
=== Founding ===
The neighborhood's name combines the names of what was the hamlet of Bedford, and the Stuyvesant Heights neighborhoods, initially separate neighborhoods that grew together. The 17th-century hamlet of Bedford was named after the market town of Bedford in England. Stuyvesant Heights was named for Peter Stuyvesant, the last governor of the colony of New Netherland.

==== 17th and 18th centuries ====
In the second half of the 17th century, the lands which constitute the present neighborhood belonged to three Dutch settlers: Dirck Janse Hooghland, who operated a ferryboat on the East River, and farmers Jan Hansen, and Leffert Pietersen van Haughwout. In pre-revolutionary Kings County, Bedford was the first major settlement east of the Village of Brooklyn, on the ferry road to the town of Jamaica and eastern Long Island. Stuyvesant Heights, however, was farmland; the area became a community after the American Revolutionary War.

For most of its early history, Stuyvesant Heights was part of the outlying farm area of the small hamlet of Bedford, settled by the Dutch during the 17th century within the incorporated town of Breuckelen. The hamlet had its beginnings when a group of Breuckelen residents decided to improve their farm properties behind the Wallabout section, which gradually developed into an important produce center and market. The petition to form a new hamlet was approved by Governor Stuyvesant in 1663. Its leading signer was Thomas Lambertsen, a carpenter from Holland.

In 1664, the English capture of New Netherland signaled the end of Dutch rule. In Governor Nicolls' Charter of 1667 and in the Charter of 1686, Bedford is mentioned as a settlement within the Town of Brueckelen. Bedford hamlet had an inn as early as 1668, and, in 1670, the people of Breuckelen purchased from the Canarsie Indians an additional area for common lands in the surrounding region.

Bedford Corners, approximately located where the present Bedford Avenue meets Fulton Street, and only three blocks west of the present Historic District, was the intersection of several well traveled roads. The Brooklyn and Jamaica Turnpike, constructed by a corporation founded in 1809 and one of the oldest roads in Kings County, ran parallel to the present Fulton Street, from the East River ferry to the village of Brooklyn, thence to the hamlet of Bedford and on toward Jamaica via Bed–Stuy. Farmers from New Lots and Flatbush used this road on their way to Manhattan.

Within the Stuyvesant Heights Historic District, the Turnpike ran along the approximate line of Decatur Street. Cripplebush Road to Newtown and the Clove Road to Flatbush also met at Bedford Corners. Hunterfly Road, which joined the Turnpike about a mile to the east of Clove Road, also served as a route for farmers and fishermen of the Canarsie and New Lots areas.

At the time of the Revolution, Leffert's son Jakop was a leading citizen of Bedford and the town clerk of Brooklyn. His neighbor, Lambert Suydam, was captain of the Kings County cavalry in 1776. An important part of the Battle of Long Island took place in and near the Historic District. In 1784, the people of the Town of Brooklyn held their first town meeting since 1776.

==== 19th century ====
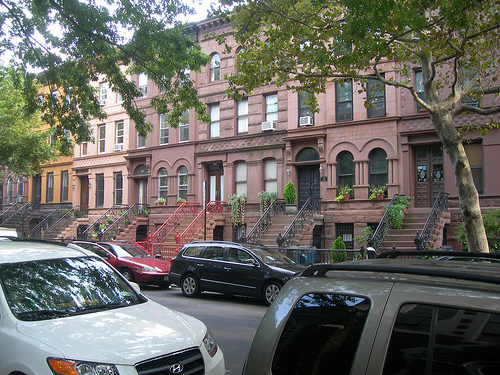
Row houses on MacDonough Street

In 1800, Bedford was designated one of the seven districts of the Town of Brooklyn, and, in 1834, it became part of the seventh and ninth wards of the newly incorporated City of Brooklyn. With the building of the Brooklyn and Jamaica Railroad in 1833, along Atlantic Avenue, Bedford was established as a railroad station near the intersection of current Atlantic Avenue and Franklin Avenues. In 1836, the Brooklyn and Jamaica Railroad was taken over by the Long Island Rail Road (LIRR), which in 1878 would gain a connection to the Brooklyn, Flatbush and Coney Island Railway's northern terminal. The Weeksville subsection, founded in 1838, was recognized as one of the first, free African-American communities in the United States.

The present street grid was laid out in 1835, as shown by the Street Commissioners map of 1839, and the blocks were divided into lots. The new street grid led to the abandonment of the Brooklyn and Jamaica Turnpike in favor of a continuation of Brooklyn's Fulton Street. The lands for the street grid were sold to the City of Brooklyn in 1852. When Charles C. Betts purchased Maria Lott's tract of land the same year, this marked the end of two centuries of Dutch patrimonial holdings. Most of the streets were opened in the 1860s, at which point Bedford–Stuyvesant's streets were named after prominent figures in American history.

The Dripps Map of 1869 shows that the area was still largely rural with a few freestanding houses mostly on MacDonough Street. The real development of the district began slowly at first, accelerating between 1885 and 1900, and gradually tapering off during the first two decades of the 20th century.

In 1857, the City of Brooklyn acquired part of the estate of Tunis Johnson, grandson of Jeremiah Johnson, to establish a public park. The park was opened in 1871, named Tompkins Park after Daniel D. Tompkins. In 1985 it was renamed Herbert Von King Park after the local community leader.

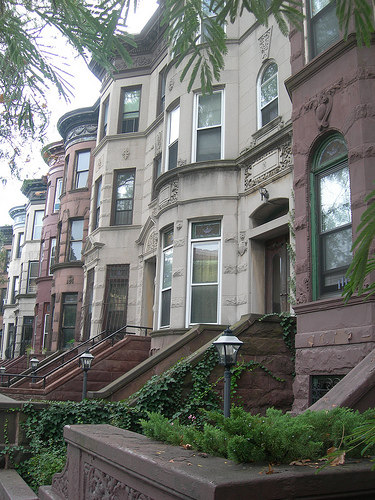
Along Stuyvesant Avenue

Construction of masonry row houses in the 1870s began to transform the rural district into an urban area. The first row of masonry houses in Stuyvesant Heights was built in 1872 on MacDonough Street for developer Curtis L. North. In the 1880s and 1890s, more rows were added, most of the Stuyvesant Heights north of Decatur Street looked much as it does today. Stuyvesant Heights was emerging as a neighborhood entity with its own distinctive characteristics. The houses had large rooms, high ceilings and large windows, and were built primarily by German immigrants.

The people who bought these houses were generally upper-middle-class families, mostly lawyers, shopkeepers, and merchants of German and Irish descent, with a sprinkling of English people; there were also a few professionals. A contemporary description calls it a very well kept residential neighborhood, typical of the general description of Brooklyn as "a town of homes and churches".

Built in 1863, the Capitoline Grounds were the home of the Brooklyn Atlantics baseball team. The grounds were bordered by Nostrand Avenue, Halsey Street, Marcy Avenue, and Putnam Avenue. During the winters, the operators would flood the area and open an ice-skating arena. The grounds were demolished in 1880.

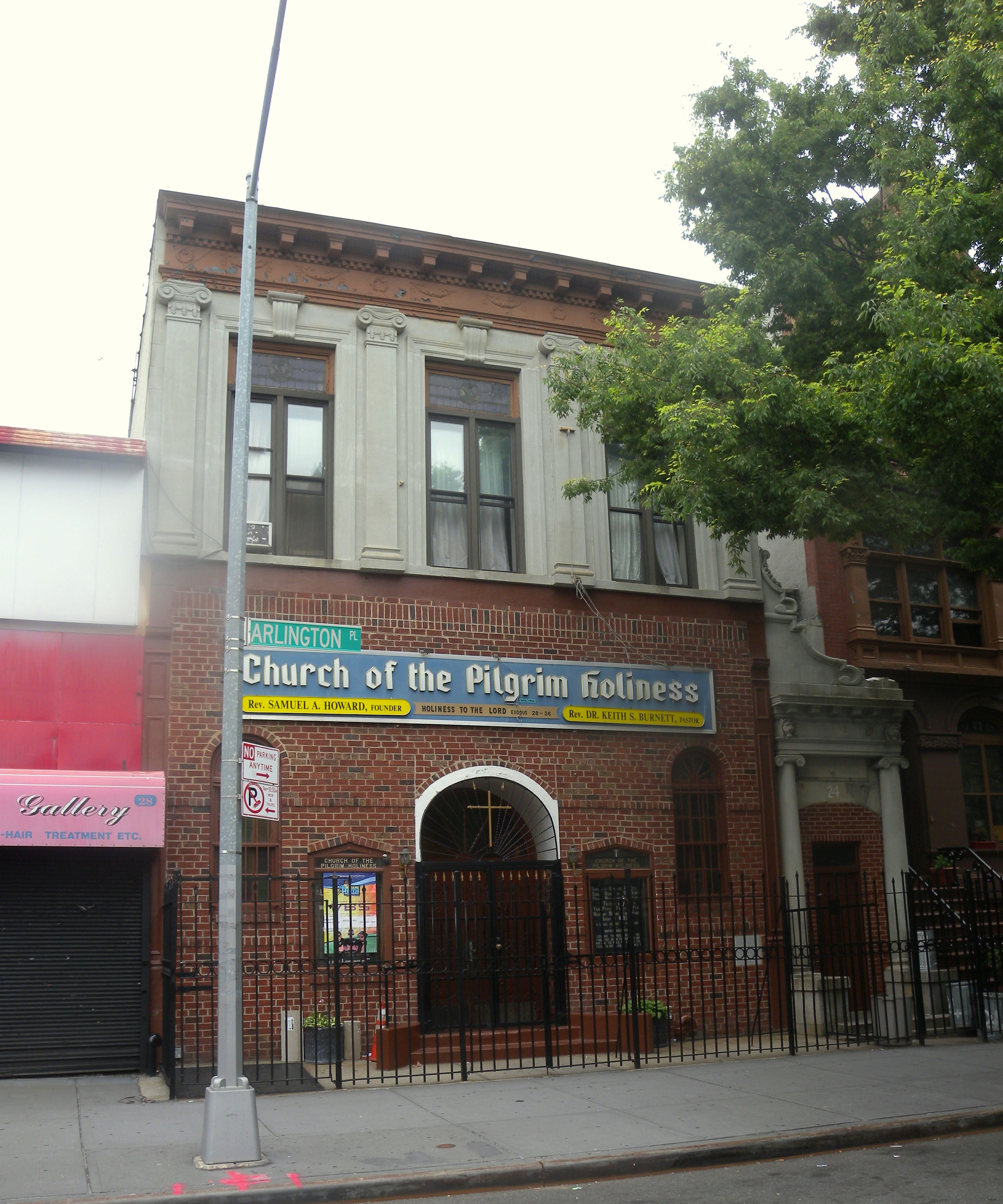
Macon Street and Arlington Place

In 1890, the city of Brooklyn founded another subsection: Ocean Hill, a working-class predominantly Italian enclave. In the last decades of the 19th century, with the advent of electric trolleys and the Fulton Street Elevated, Bedford–Stuyvesant became a working-class and middle-class bedroom community for those working in downtown Brooklyn and Manhattan in New York City. At that time, most of the pre-existing wooden homes were destroyed and replaced with brownstone rowhouses.

=== 20th century ===
==== 1900s to 1950s ====
In 1907, the completion of the Williamsburg Bridge facilitated the immigration of Jews and Italians from the Lower East Side of Manhattan. In 1911 the Bushwick Theatre (now Brooklyn High School for Law and Technology) opened at the at the corner of Broadway and Howard Avenue.

During the 1930s, major changes took place due to the Great Depression years. Immigrants from the American South and the Caribbean brought the neighborhood's black population to around 30,000, making it the second largest Black community in the city at the time. During World War II, the Brooklyn Navy Yard attracted many black New Yorkers to the neighborhood as an opportunity for employment.

The relatively prosperous war economy enabled many of the Jewish and Italian residents to move to Long Island and New Jersey. By 1950, the number of black residents had risen to 155,000, comprising about 55 percent of the population of Bedford–Stuyvesant. In the 1950s, real estate agents and speculators employed blockbusting to turn a profit. As a result, formerly middle-class white homes were being turned over to poorer black families. By 1960, eighty-five percent of the population was black.

==== 1960s ====
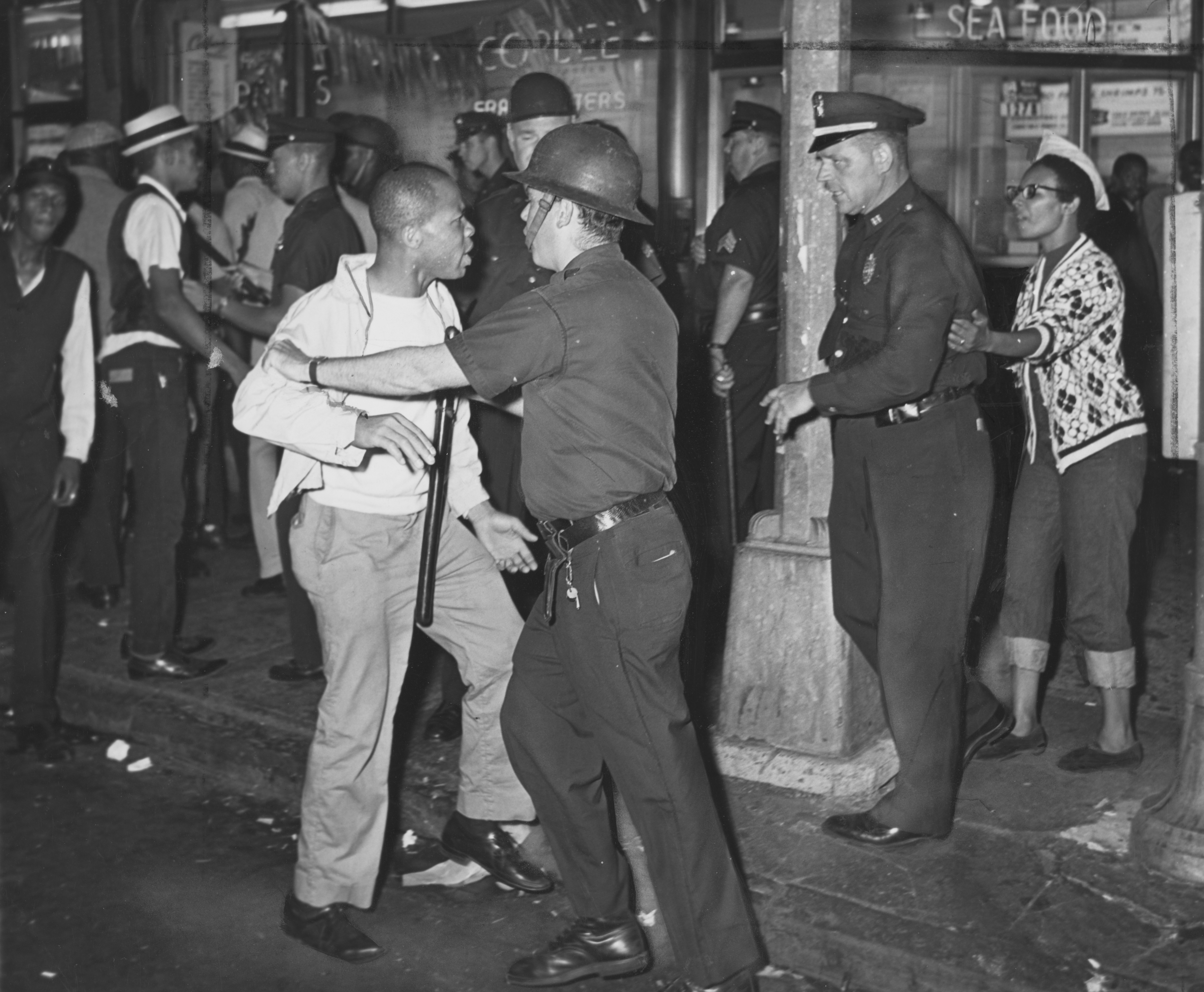
A confrontation between black protesters and police at Fulton Street and Nostrand Avenue during the 1964 riot

Gang wars erupted in 1961 in Bedford–Stuyvesant, and Alfred E. Clark of The New York Times referred to it as "Brooklyn's Little Harlem". One of the first urban riots of the era took place there due to social and racial divisions in the city contributed to the tensions. The relationship between the NYPD and the city's black community became strained due to perceptions of the NYPD as being oppressive and racially biased, and at that time, few black policemen were present on the force.

Predominantly black neighborhoods received disproportionate rates of arrests and prosecutions for drug-related crimes, and the NYPD's 79th Precinct in Bedford–Stuyvesant had been one of the only three police precincts in the NYPD to which black police officers were assigned. Race riots followed in 1967 and 1968, as part of the political and racial tensions in the United States of the era, aggravated by continued high unemployment among blacks, continued de facto segregation in housing, and the failure to enforce civil rights laws.

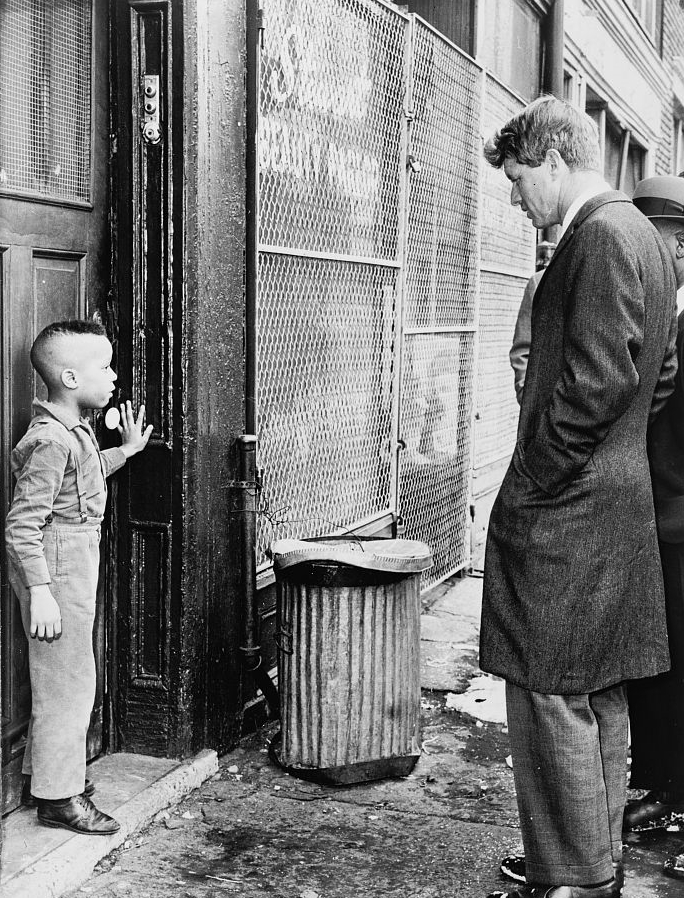
Senator Robert F. Kennedy speaks with a boy while touring Bedford–Stuyvesant.

With the help of local activists and politicians, such as Civil Court Judge Thomas Jones, grassroots organizations of community members and businesses willing to aid were formed and began the rebuilding of Bedford–Stuyvesant. In 1965, Andrew W. Cooper, a journalist from Bedford–Stuyvesant, brought suit under the Voting Rights Act against racial gerrymandering under the grounds that Bedford–Stuyvesant was divided among five congressional districts, each with a white representative. It resulted in the creation of New York's 12th Congressional District and the election in 1968 of Shirley Chisholm, the first black woman and West Indian American ever elected to the US Congress.

In 1967, Robert F. Kennedy, U.S. senator for New York state, launched a study of problems facing the urban poor in Bedford–Stuyvesant, which received almost no federal aid and was the city's largest non-white community. Under Kennedy's leadership and with the help of activists, the Bedford Stuyvesant Restoration Corporation was established as the United States' first community development corporation. The Manhattan-based Development and Services Corporation (D&S) was established with business, banking and professional leaders which advised and raised private funding for the BSRC's projects.

The abandoned Sheffield Milk bottling plant on Fulton Street was turned into the BSRC offices in 1967, and the BSRC bought and renovated many housing units and administered a $73 million mortgage assistance program to encourage African-American homeownership. The BSRC also implemented a controversial plan by I.M. Pei to close off St. Marks Avenue and Prospect Place, between Kingston and Albany Avenues, and convert these into community spaces.

==== 1970s and 1980s ====
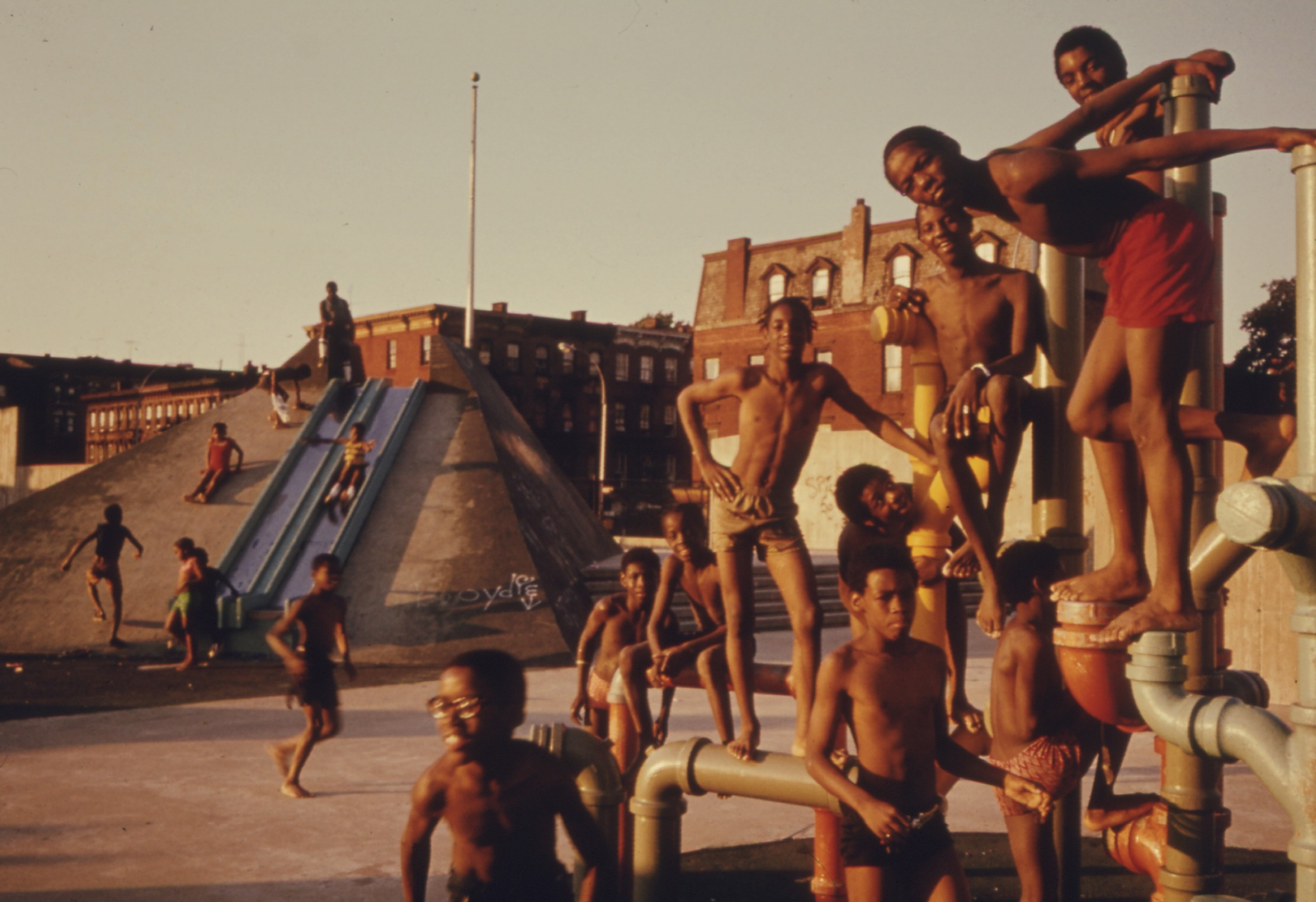
Youth play in an adventure playground at the "K-pool" public swimming pool in Bedford–Stuyvesant in July 1974. Photo by Danny Lyon.

In the late 1980s, resistance to illegal drug-dealing included, according to Rita Webb Smith, following police arrests with a civilian Sunni Muslim 40-day patrol of several blocks near a mosque, the same group having earlier evicted drug sellers at a landlord's request, although that also resulted in arrests of the Muslims for "burglary, menacing and possession of weapons", resulting in a probationary sentence.

=== 2000s ===
Beginning in the 2000s, the neighborhood began to experience gentrification. The two significant reasons for this were the affordable housing stock consisting of brownstone rowhouses located on quiet tree-lined streets, as well as a significant decrease of crime in the neighborhood. Many properties were renovated after the start of the 21st century, and new retailers began moving to the neighborhood. Both the Fulton Street and Nostrand Avenue commercial corridors became part of the Bed-Stuy Gateway Business Improvement District, bringing along with it a beautification project. Through a series of "wallscapes" (large outdoor murals), the campaign honored famous community members, including community activist and poet June Jordan, activist Hattie Carthan, and rapper The Notorious B.I.G. The campaign sought to show off the area's positive accomplishments.

Several long-time residents and business owners expressed concern that they would be priced out by newcomers, whom they disparagingly characterize as "yuppies and buppies [black urban professionals]", according to one neighborhood blog. They feared that the neighborhood's ethnic character would be lost. However, Bedford–Stuyvesant's population has experienced much less displacement of the black population than other areas of Brooklyn, such as Williamsburg and Cobble Hill. Bedford–Stuyvesant saw the influx of more upwardly mobile middle-class African-American families, as well as immigrants from Africa and the Caribbean. Surrounding neighborhoods in northern and eastern Brooklyn have a combined population of about 940,000 and are roughly 82% black, making them the largest concentration of African Americans in the United States.

In July 2005, the NYPD designated the Fulton Street–Nostrand Avenue business district in Bedford–Stuyvesant as an "Impact Zone", which directed significantly increased levels of police protection and resources to the area for two consecutive six-month periods, resulting in a 15% decrease in crime within one year. Despite the improvements and increasing stability of the community, Bedford–Stuyvesant has continued to be stigmatized in some circles. In March 2005 a campaign was launched to supplant the "Bed-Stuy, Do-or-Die" slogan with "Bed-Stuy, and Proud of It". Violent crime also remained a problem in the area, and the two precincts that cover Bedford–Stuyvesant reported a combined 37 murders in 2010.

==== 2010s to present ====
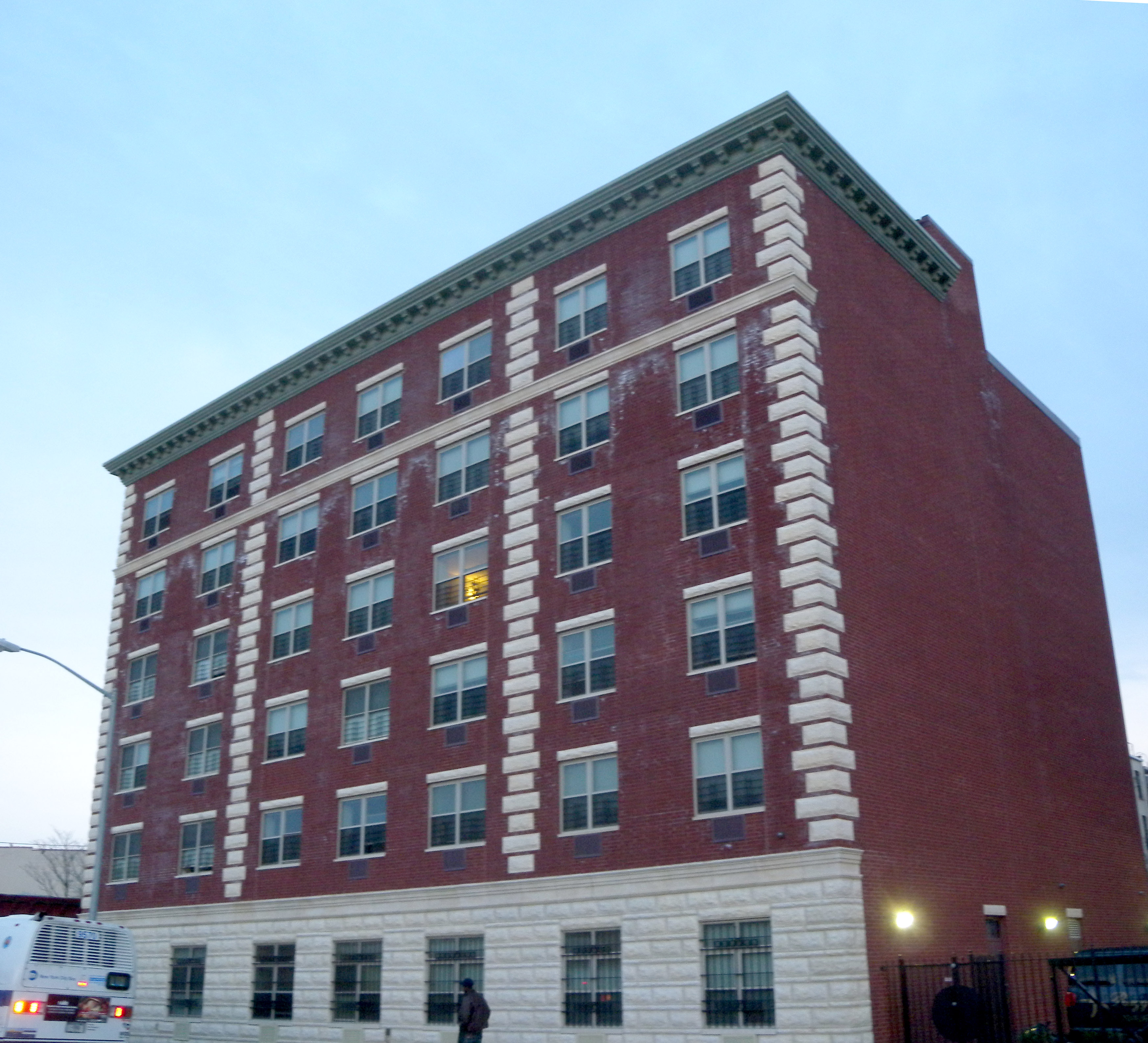
The view southeast across Lafayette Avenue, looking toward Patchen Avenue

Despite the largest recession to hit the United States in the last 70 years, gentrification continued steadily, and the blocks west of the Nostrand Avenue/Fulton Street intersection and north of Fulton Street and Stuyvesant Avenue were particularly impacted. In 2011, Bedford–Stuyvesant listed three Zagat-rated restaurants for the first time; by 2014, there were over ten Zagat-rated establishments. Moreover, in June 2013, 7 Arlington Place, the setting for Spike Lee's 1994 film Crooklyn, was sold for over its asking price, at $1.7 million.

A diverse mix of students, hipsters, artists, creative professionals, architects, and attorneys of all races continued to move to the neighborhood. A business improvement district was launched along the Fulton and Nostrand Corridor, with a redesigned streetscape planned to include new street trees, street furniture, pavers, and signage and improved cleanliness in an effort to attract more business investment. Major infrastructure upgrades have been performed or are in progress, such as Select Bus Service bus rapid transit on the B44 route along Nostrand and Bedford Avenues, which began operating in late 2013.

Other infrastructure upgrades in the neighborhood included major sewer and water modernization projects, as well as fiber-optic and cable service upgrades. Improved natural and organic produce continued to become available at local delis and grocers, the farmer's market on Malcolm X Boulevard, and through the Bed-Stuy Farm Share. FreshDirect services the neighborhood, and a large member constituency of the adjacent Greene-Hill Food Coop are from Bedford–Stuyvesant.

==== 2020s ====
In 2020, western Bedford-Stuyvesant had an almost equal population of white and black residents, with each of their populations at between 30,000 and 39,999, and between 10,000 and 19,999 Hispanic residents. Eastern Bedford-Stuvyvesant had over 40,000 black residents, 20,000 to 29,000 white residents, and 10,000 to 19,999 Hispanic residents. The 2020 census data show Bedford-Stuyvesant with an increasing diverse racial community.

In 2024, the installation of Bed-Stuy Aquarium highlighted the broader social tensions surrounding gentrification in the neighborhood. In one notable incident, two residents attempted to remove some of the fish, citing cruelty, which sparked a larger debate about the neighborhood's changing dynamics.

== Subsections ==
=== Bedford ===
Bedford is located toward the western end of Bedford–Stuyvesant. Before the American Revolutionary War times, it was the first settlement to the east of the Village of Brooklyn. It was originally part of the old village of Bedford, which was centered near today's Bedford Avenue–Fulton Street intersection. The area "extends from Monroe Street on the north to Macon Street and Verona Place on the south, and from just east of Bedford Avenue eastward to Tompkins Avenue," according to the Landmarks Preservation Commission. Bedford is adjacent to Williamsburg, Crown Heights, and Clinton Hill.

=== Stuyvesant Heights ===
P.O. Reinaldo Salgado Playground at Monroe Street and Patchen Avenue in Stuyvesant Heights offers a space for the Bed-Stuy community to come together for sports like basketball, soccer, baseball, tennis, and plenty of playground space for children.

Stuyvesant Heights is located toward the southern-central section of Bedford–Stuyvesant. It has historically been an African-American enclave. It derives its name from Stuyvesant Avenue, its principal thoroughfare. It was originally part of the outlying farm area of Bedford for most of its early history. A low-rise residential district of three- and four-story masonry row houses and apartment buildings with commercial ground floors, it was developed mostly between 1870 and 1920, mainly between 1895 and 1900. The Stuyvesant Heights Historic District is located within the area bounded roughly by Tompkins Avenue on the west, Macon and Halsey Streets on the north, Malcolm X Boulevard on the east, and Fulton Street on the south.

=== Other areas ===
Ocean Hill is located toward the eastern end Ocean Hill received its name in 1890 for being slightly hilly. Hence it was subdivided from the larger community of Stuyvesant Heights. From the beginning of the 20th century to the 1960s Ocean Hill was an Italian enclave. By the late 1960s, Ocean Hill and Bedford–Stuyvesant proper together formed the largest African American community in the United States.

Weeksville is located toward the southeast. Weeksville was named after James Weeks, an ex-slave from Virginia, who in 1838 bought a plot of land and founded Weeksville.

=== Historic districts ===
- Stuyvesant Heights Historic District
- U.S. National Register of Historic Places
- U.S. Historic district
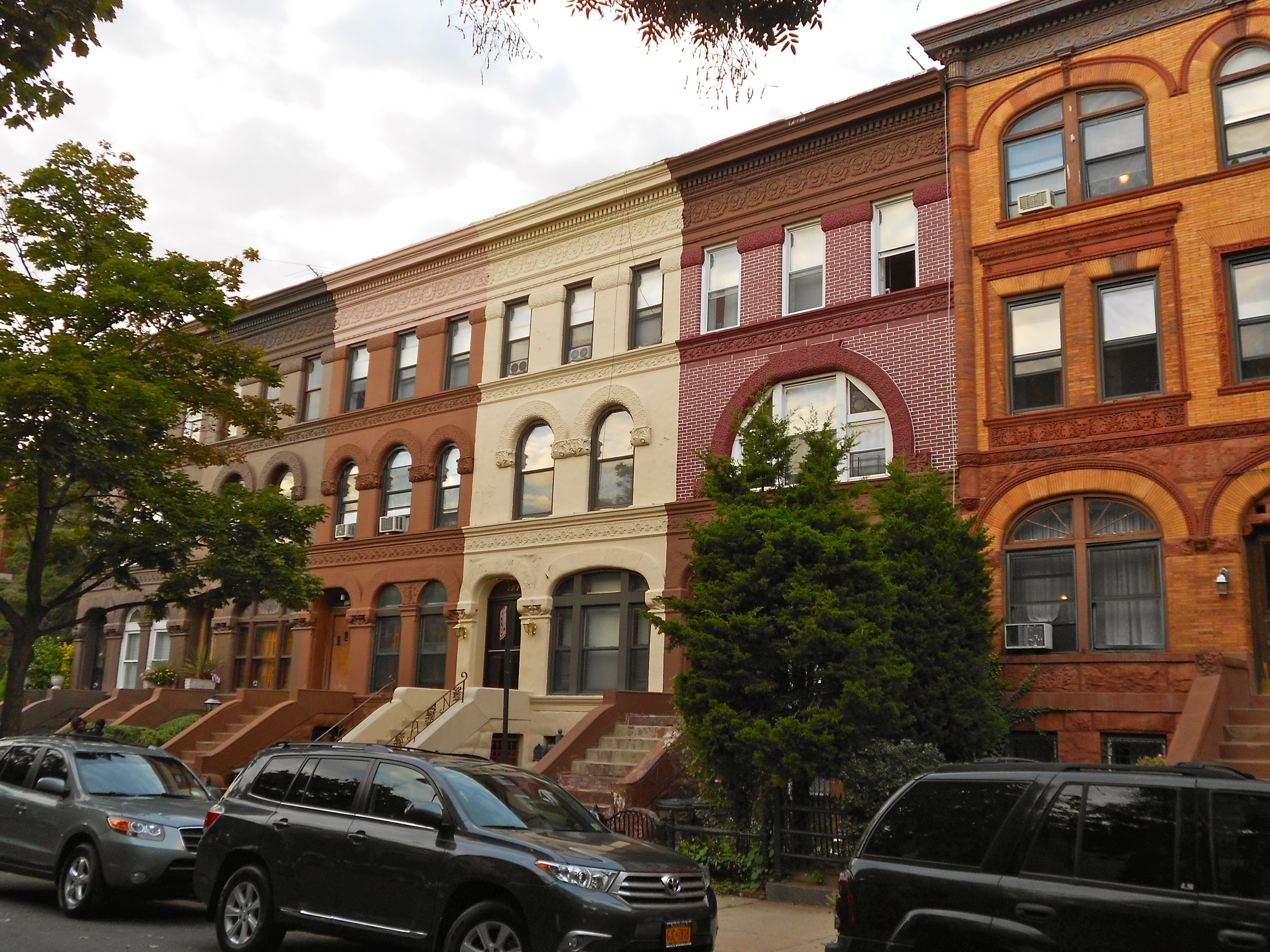
- On Decatur Street

- Location within New York City
- Location: Roughly bounded by Macon, Tompkins, Decatur, Lewis, Chauncey, and Stuyvesant, New York, New York
- Coordinates: 40°40′52″N 73°56′14″W
- Area: 42 acres (17 ha)
- Built: 1870
- Architectural style: Italianate, Queen Anne, Romanesque
- NRHP reference No.: 75001193
- Stuyvesant Heights Historic District (Boundary Increase)
- U.S. National Register of Historic Places
- U.S. Historic district
- Location: Roughly, Decatur St. from Tompkins to Lewis Aves., Brooklyn, New York
- Area: 10 acres (4.0 ha)
- Architect: multiple
- Architectural style: Italianate, Second Empire, Queen Anne
- NRHP reference No.: 96001355
- Added to NRHP: November 15, 1996
- Added to NRHP: December 4, 1975

The Stuyvesant Heights Historic District in Bedford-Stuyvesant comprises 577 contributing residential buildings built between about 1870 and 1900. The district encompasses 17 individual blocks (13 identified in 1975 and four new in 1996). The buildings within the district primarily comprise two- and three-storey rowhouses with high basements, with a few multiple dwellings and institutional structures. The district includes the Our Lady of Victory Catholic Church, the Romanesque Revival style Mount Lebanon Baptist Church, and St. Phillip's Episcopal Church. It was listed on the National Register of Historic Places in 1975 and expanded in 1996.

There are several other historic districts in the neighborhood as of 2024, designated by the New York City Landmarks Preservation Commission. Bedford Stuyvesant/Expanded Stuyvesant Heights Historic District was designated on April 16, 2013, and extended the Stuyvesant Heights district north to Jefferson Avenue, east to Malcolm X Boulevard, and west to Tompkins Avenue. The Bedford Historic District was created on December 8, 2015, and is roughly bounded by Fulton Street, Bedford Avenue, Monroe Street, and Tompkins Avenue.

The Willoughby–Hart Historic District was designated on June 25, 2024, and includes about 50 buildings on Willoughby Avenue and Hart Street. Along Atlantic Avenue, on the border with Crown Heights, is the Alice and Agate Courts Historic District, a set of 36 Queen Anne row houses which were designated on February 10, 2009.

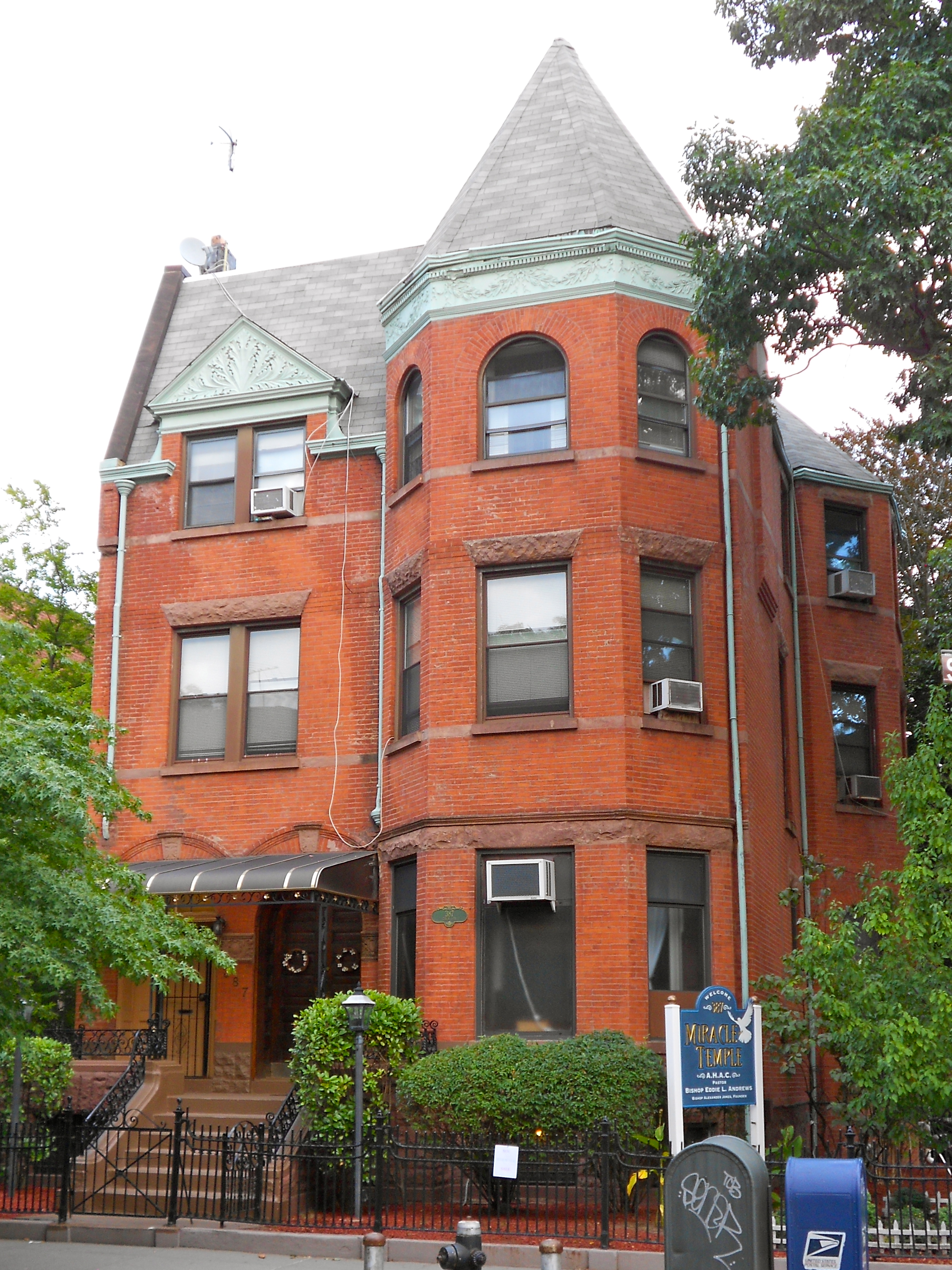
Miracle Temple

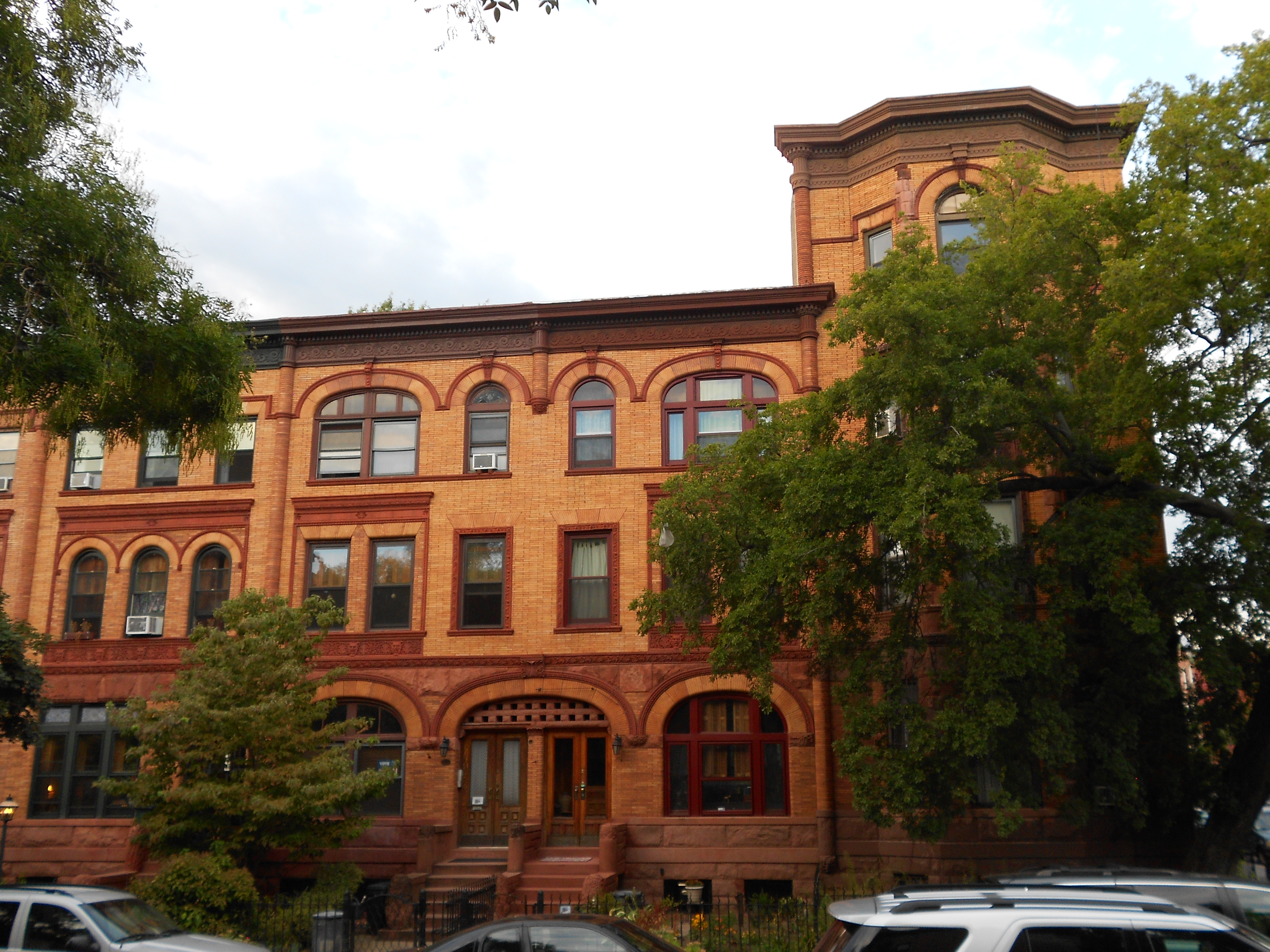
On Decatur Street

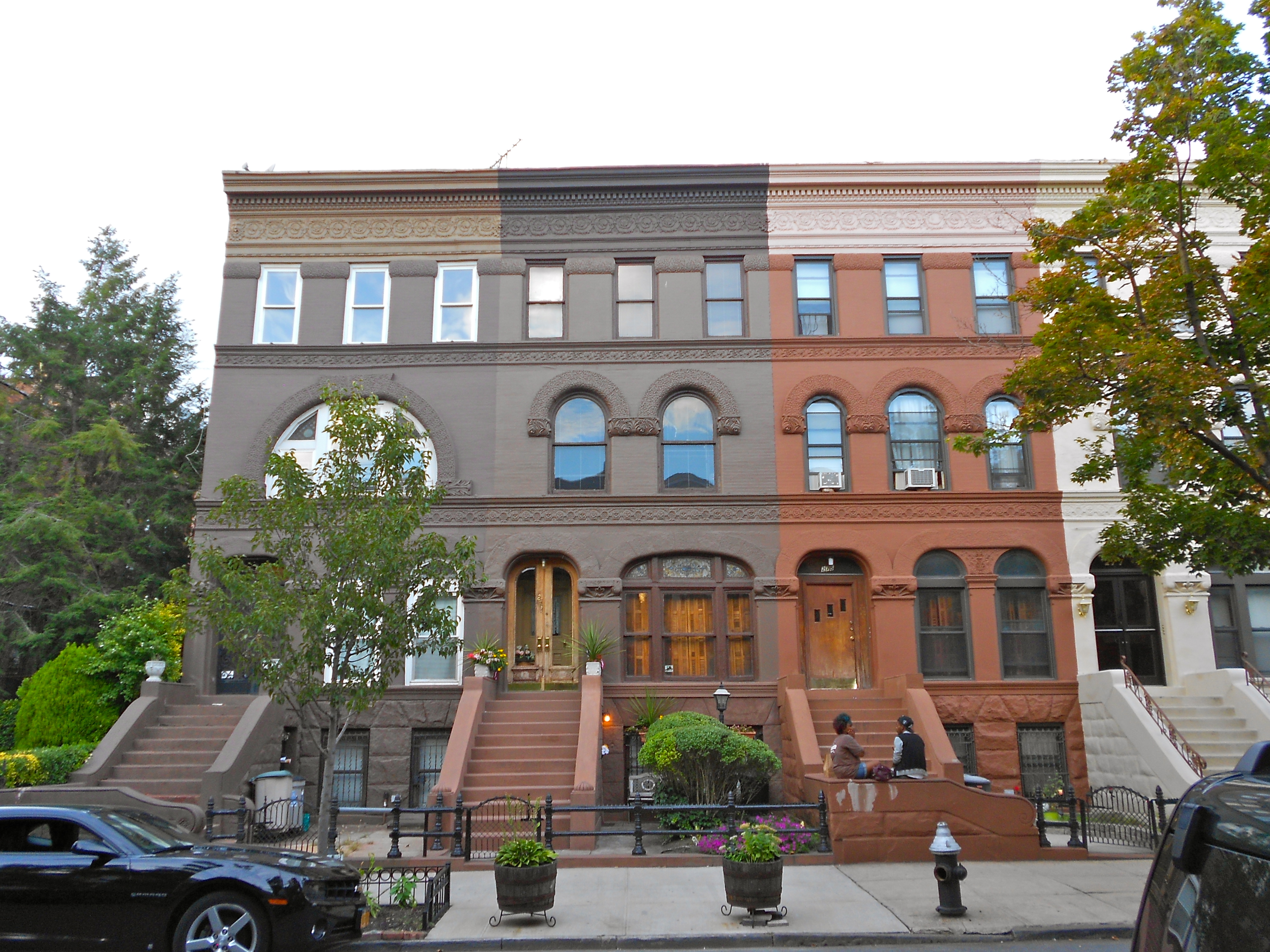
On Decatur Street

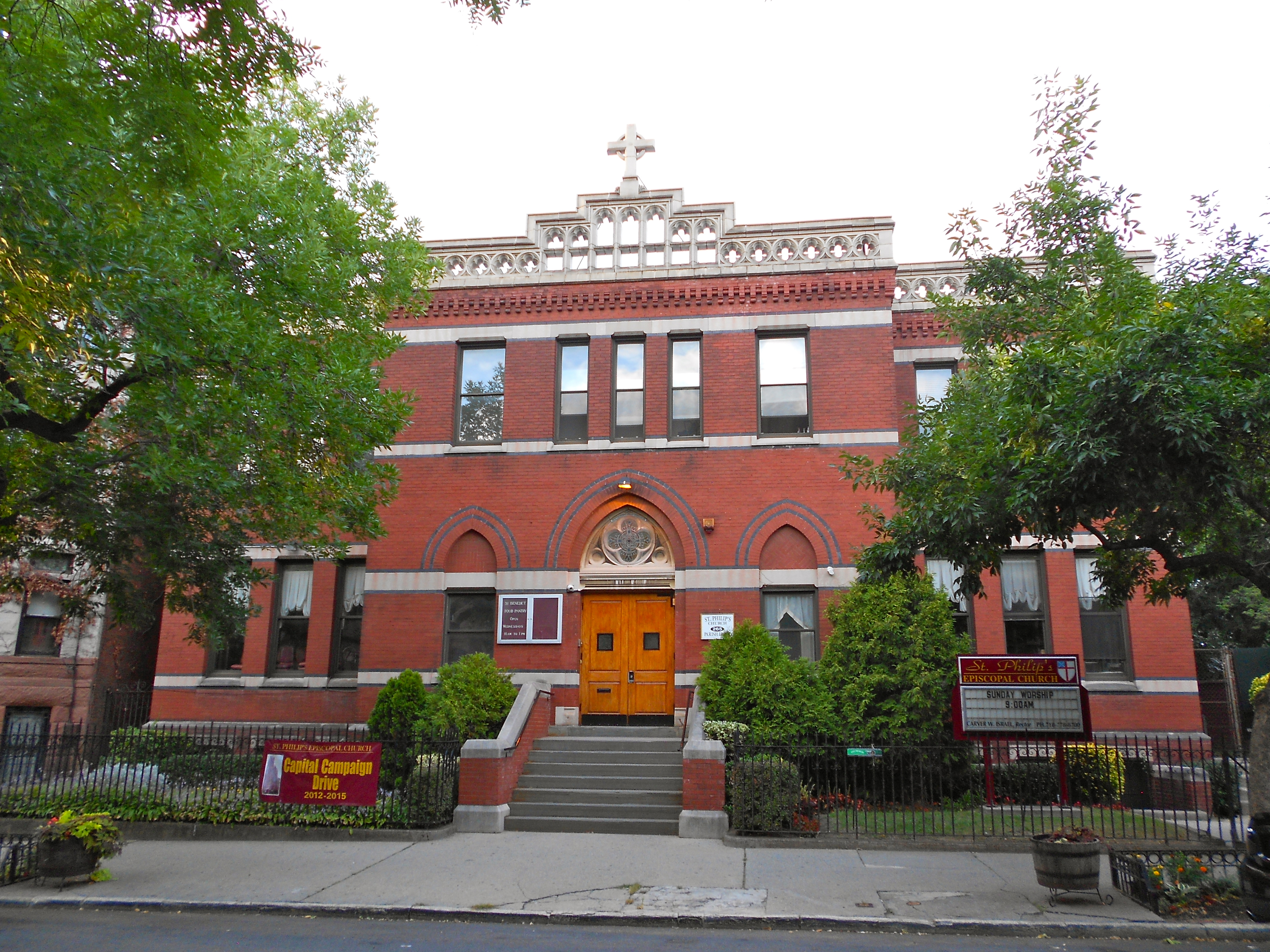
St. Phillip's Episcopal Church

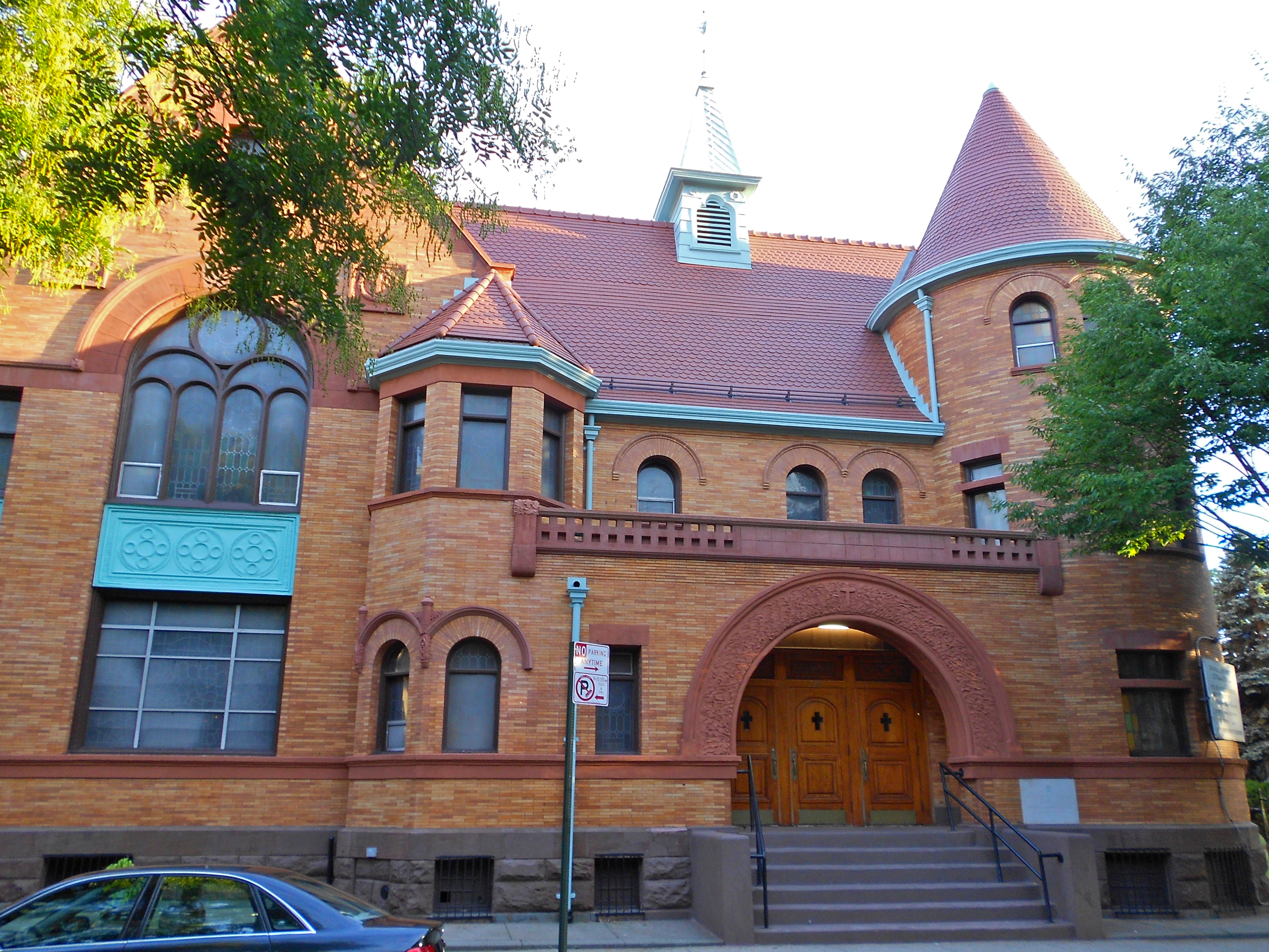
Mt. Lebanon Baptist Church

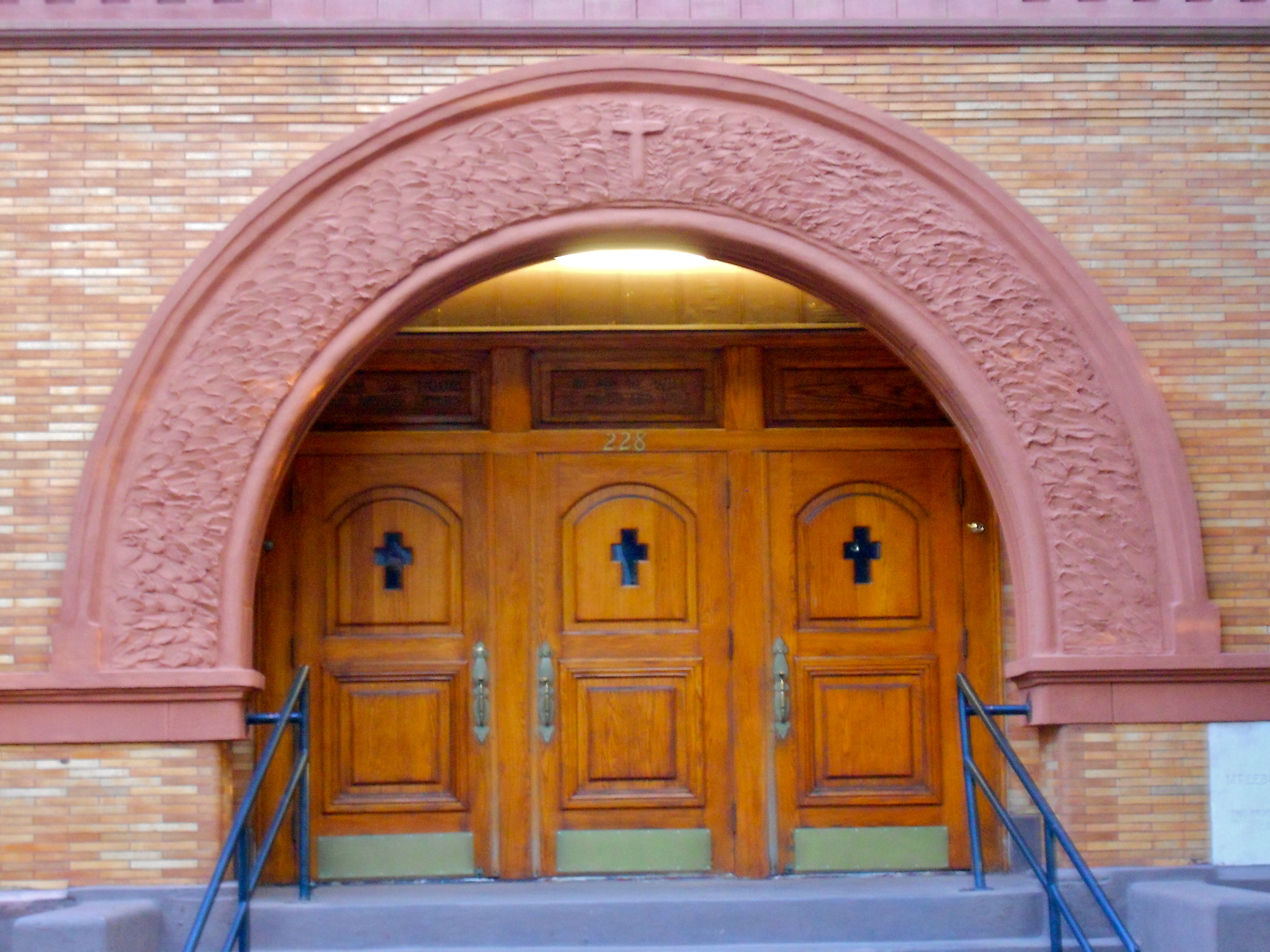
Mt. Lebanon Baptist Church

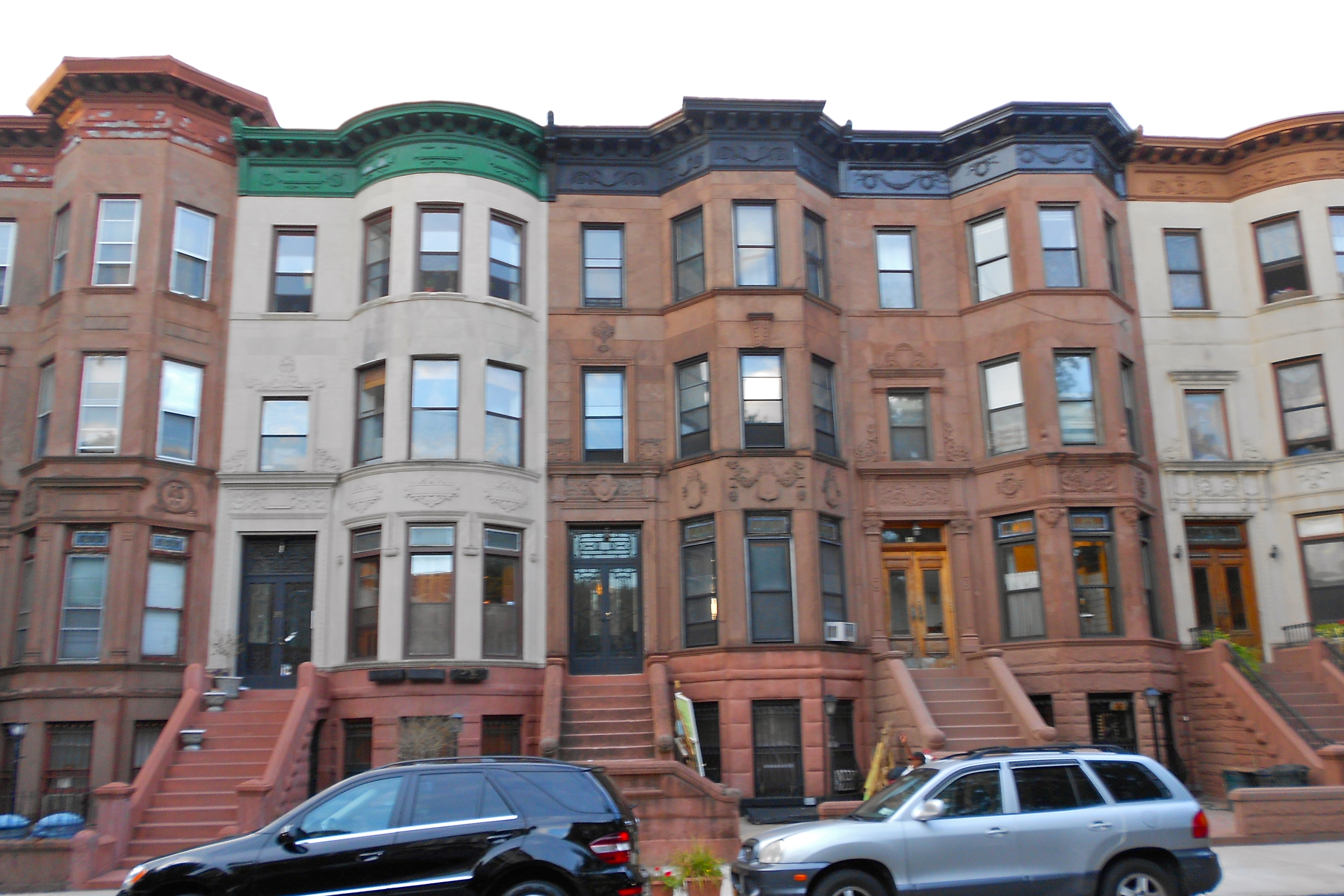
On Lewis Street

== Demographics ==
In 2018, Community Board 3 had 152,403 inhabitants, with an average life expectancy of 76.8 years. This was lower than the 2018 median life expectancy of 81.2 for all New York City neighborhoods. In 2018, most inhabitants were middle-aged adults and youth: 24% were between the ages of 0 and 17, 33% between 25 and 44, and 22% between 45 and 64. The ratio of college-aged and elderly residents was lower, at 10% and 11% respectively.

In 2022, the median household income in Community Board 3 was $71,123. In 2018, an estimated 23% of Bedford–Stuyvesant residents lived in poverty, compared to 21% in all of Brooklyn and 20% in all of New York City. One in eight residents (13%) were unemployed, compared to 9% in the rest of both Brooklyn and New York City.

Rent burden, or the percentage of residents who have difficulty paying their rent, is 53% in Bedford–Stuyvesant, higher than the citywide and boroughwide rates of 52% and 51% respectively. As of late 2021, Bedford–Stuyvesant is considered to be gentrifying.

=== Demographic trends ===
The 1790 census records of Bedford lists 132 freemen and 72 slaves. Rapid population growth followed major improvements to public transportation. By 1873, Bed-Stuy's predominantly white population was 14,000. In the early 1900s, prosperous black families began buying up the mansions of Bed-Stuy, many of which were designed by prominent architects.

The population was quick to grow. In the 1930s, Bed-Stuy's black population boomed. Following the introduction of the IND Fulton Street Line (a.k.a. the A/C line) in 1936, African-Americans left crowded Harlem in search of better housing opportunities. Bed-Stuy quickly became the second destination for black New Yorkers. In 1961, the New York Times even dubbed it "Little Harlem".

After a large decline during the 1970s, mirroring the citywide decline, the population in Bedford Stuyvesant grew by 34 percent between 1980 and 2015, faster than the citywide growth rate of 21 percent, to reach 150,900 residents. The population increased by 25 percent between 2000 and 2015, more than three times faster than the citywide rate. The ethnic and racial mix of the population has undergone dramatic changes in the past 15 years as the neighborhood has attracted new residents.

Three-quarters of the residents identified as black or African American in 2000. The Black population declined to less than half of the population by 2015. In 2015, one-quarter of the residents were white and nearly one-fifth were Hispanic. In 2000, less than three percent of the population was white. The Hispanic share of the population has remained relatively unchanged.

The Asian population has grown, but remains relatively small, making up less than 5 percent of the neighborhood. In 2022, the population was 31% black, 29% white, 24% Hispanic, 8% Asian, and 8% other or from two or more races.

== Politics ==
The neighborhood is part of New York's 8th congressional district, represented by Democrat Hakeem Jeffries as of 2013. It is also part of the 18th and 25th State Senate districts, represented respectively by Democrats Julia Salazar and Jabari Brisport, and the 54th, 55th, and 56th State Assembly districts, represented respectively by Democrats Erik Dilan, Latrice Walker, and Stefani Zinerman. Bed-Stuy is located in the New York City Council's 36th and 41st districts, represented respectively by Democrats Chi Ossé and Darlene Mealy.

== Police and crime ==
Bedford–Stuyvesant is patrolled by two precincts of the NYPD. The 81st Precinct is located at 30 Ralph Avenue, serving the area east of Marcus Garvey Boulevard, and the 79th Precinct is located at 263 Tompkins Avenue, serving the area west of Marcus Garvey Boulevard.

== Fire safety ==
The New York City Fire Department (FDNY) operates seven fire stations in Bedford–Stuyvesant.

== Health ==
As of 2018, preterm births and births to teenage mothers are more common in Bedford–Stuyvesant than in other places citywide. In Bedford–Stuyvesant, there were 95 preterm births per 1,000 live births (compared to 87 per 1,000 citywide), and 26.9 births to teenage mothers per 1,000 live births (compared to 19.3 per 1,000 citywide). Bedford–Stuyvesant has a relatively low population of residents who are uninsured, or who receive healthcare through Medicaid. In 2018, this population of uninsured residents was estimated to be 11%, which is slightly lower than the citywide rate of 12%.

The concentration of fine particulate matter, the deadliest type of air pollutant, in Bedford–Stuyvesant is 0.0081 milligrams per cubic metre (8.1×10^{−9} oz/ft^{3}), higher than the citywide and boroughwide averages. Nineteen percent of Bedford–Stuyvesant residents are smokers, which is higher than the city average of 14% of residents being smokers. In Bedford–Stuyvesant, 29% of residents are obese, 13% are diabetic, and 34% have high blood pressure—compared to the citywide averages of 24%, 11%, and 28% respectively. In addition, 22% of children are obese, compared to the citywide average of 20%.

Eighty-four percent of residents eat some fruits and vegetables every day, which is slightly lower than the city's average of 87%. In 2018, 76% of residents described their health as "good", "very good", or "excellent", slightly less than the city's average of 78%. For every supermarket in Bedford–Stuyvesant, there are 57 bodegas.

There are several hospitals in the Bed-Stuy area, including the Woodhull Medical Center and the Interfaith Medical Center.

== Post offices and ZIP Codes ==
Bedford–Stuyvesant is covered by four primary ZIP Codes (11206, 11216, 11221, 11233) and parts of three other ZIP Codes (11205, 11213, and 11233). The northern part of the neighborhood is covered by 11206; the central part, by 11221; the southwestern part, by 11216; and the southeastern part, by 11233. In addition, the ZIP Code 11205 covers several blocks in the northwestern corner of Bed-Stuy, and 11213 includes several blocks in the extreme southern portion of the neighborhood.

The United States Postal Service operates four post offices nearby: the Restoration Plaza Station at 1360 Fulton Street, the Shirley A Chisholm Station at 1915 Fulton Street, the Bushwick Station at 1369 Broadway, and the Halsey Station at 805 MacDonough Street.

== Education ==
In 2018, Bedford–Stuyvesant generally had lower ratio of college-educated residents than the rest of the city. While 35% of residents age 25 and older had a college education or higher, 21% had less than a high-school education and 43% were high-school graduates or had some college education. In 2018, 40% of Brooklynites and 38% of city residents had a college education or higher.

The percentage of Bedford–Stuyvesant students excelling in reading and math has been increasing, with reading achievement rising from 32 percent in 2000 to 37 percent in 2011, and math achievement rising from 23 percent to 47 percent within the same time period.

In 2016, Bedford–Stuyvesant's rate of elementary-school student absenteeism was higher than the rest of New York City. In 2018, 30% of elementary-school students missed twenty or more days per school year, compared to the citywide average of 20% of students. In 2018, 70% of high-school students in Bedford–Stuyvesant graduated on time, lower than the citywide average of 75% of students.

=== Schools ===
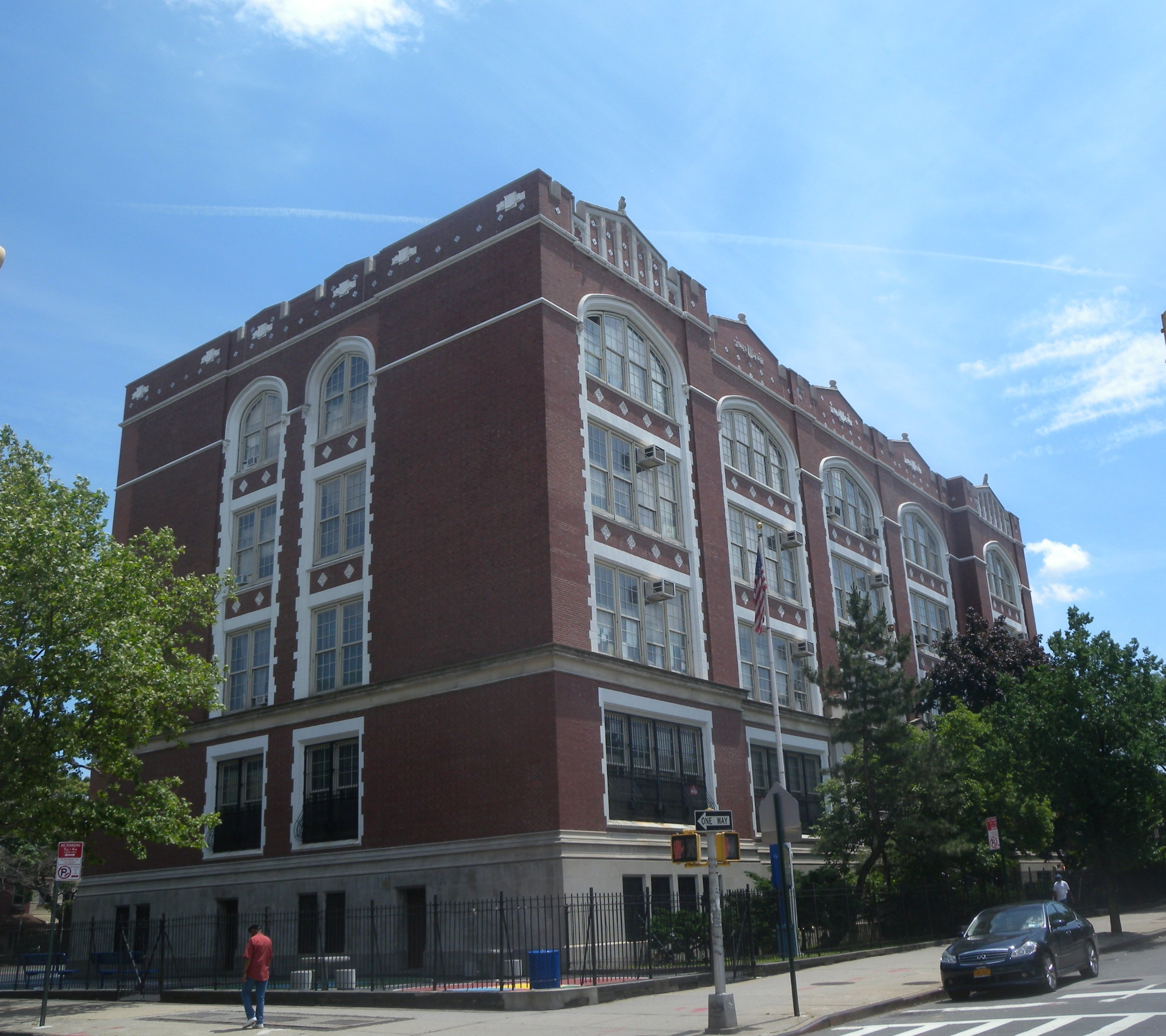
PS 93, Prescott School

Several public schools serve Bedford-Stuyvesant. The zoned high school for the neighborhood is Boys and Girls High School on Fulton Street. The Brooklyn Brownstone School, a public elementary school located in the MS 35 campus on MacDonough Street, was developed in 2008 by the Stuyvesant Heights Parents Association and the New York City Board of Education. At the eastern edge of the neighborhood is Paul Robeson High School for Business and Technology.

Many public schools are named after prominent African Americans and, as stated by Nikole Hannah-Jones in The New York Times, were "intended to evoke black uplift". Hannah-Jones wrote in 2016 that many wealthier residents choose to use magnet schools or private schools instead of neighborhood schools.

For the early grades Ember Charter School for Mindful Education and Success Academy Bed-Stuy 1 and 2 are charter schools. Bed-Stuy is also home to the Brooklyn Waldorf School, which moved to Claver Castle (at 11 Jefferson Avenue) in 2011.

Other institutions include:

- Boys High School
- Girl's High School
- Pratt Institute
- Brooklyn Brownstone Elementary School
- Weeksville Heritage Center
- Bedford Academy High School

By 2021, the interim location of the German School of Brooklyn (GSB) was the former Coop School in the Bedford Stuyvesant and Clinton Hill area. In 2021, the school moved all levels to its permanent site at 9 Hanover Place in Downtown Brooklyn.

=== Libraries ===
The Brooklyn Public Library (BPL) has four branches in Bedford-Stuyvesant:

- The Bedford branch and Bedford Learning Center, at 496 Franklin Avenue near Fulton Street. The branch opened in 1905.
- The Marcy branch, at 617 DeKalb Avenue near Nostrand Avenue.
- The Macon branch, at 361 Lewis Avenue near Macon Street. The branch is a Carnegie library that opened in 1907. It contains the Dionne Mack-Harvin Center, a collection dedicated to African American culture.
- The Saratoga branch, at 8 Thomas S. Boyland Street near Macon Street. The branch is a Carnegie library that opened in 1909.

== Transportation ==
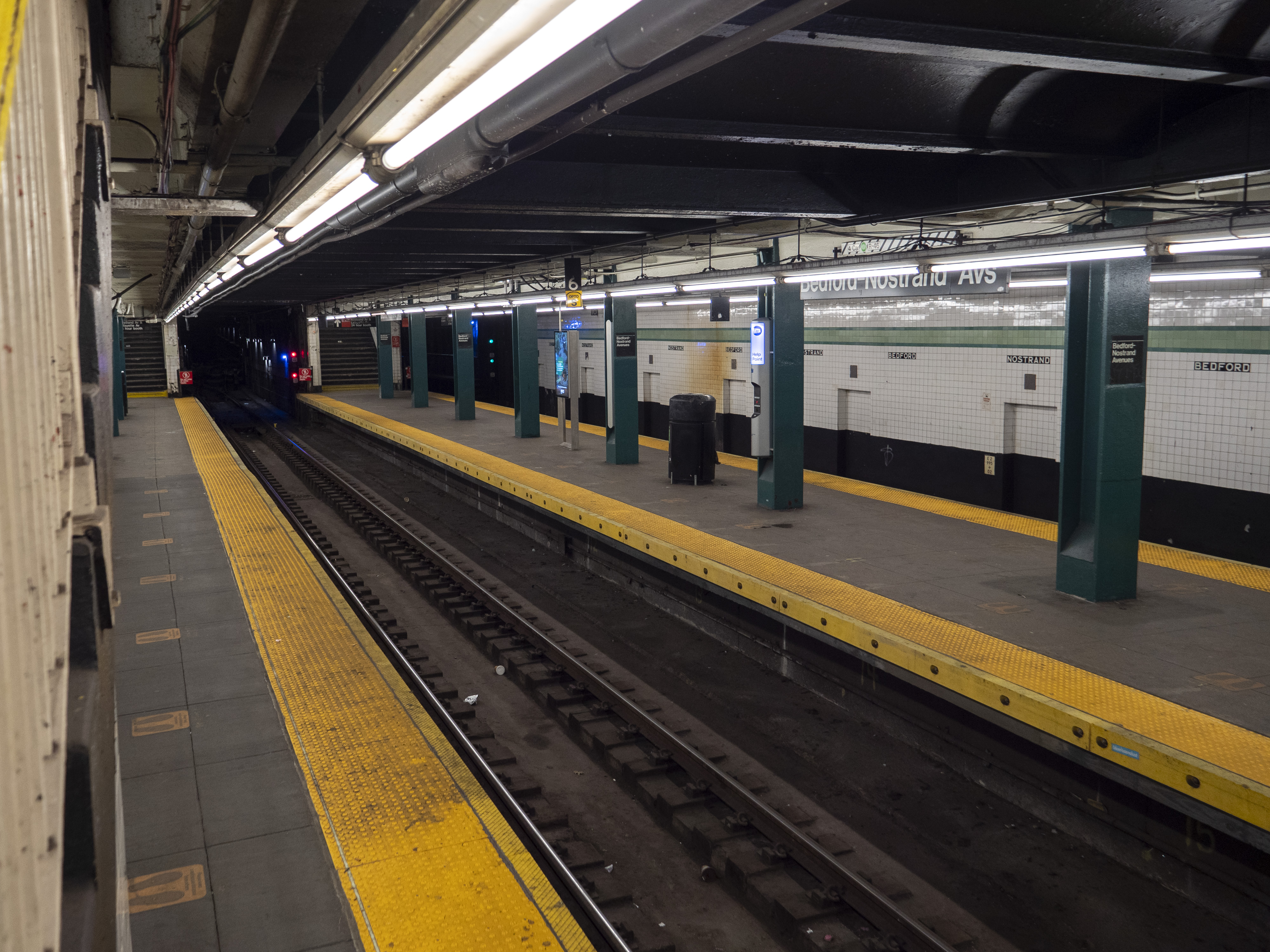
The Bedford–Nostrand Avenues station of the New York City Subway's IND Crosstown Line

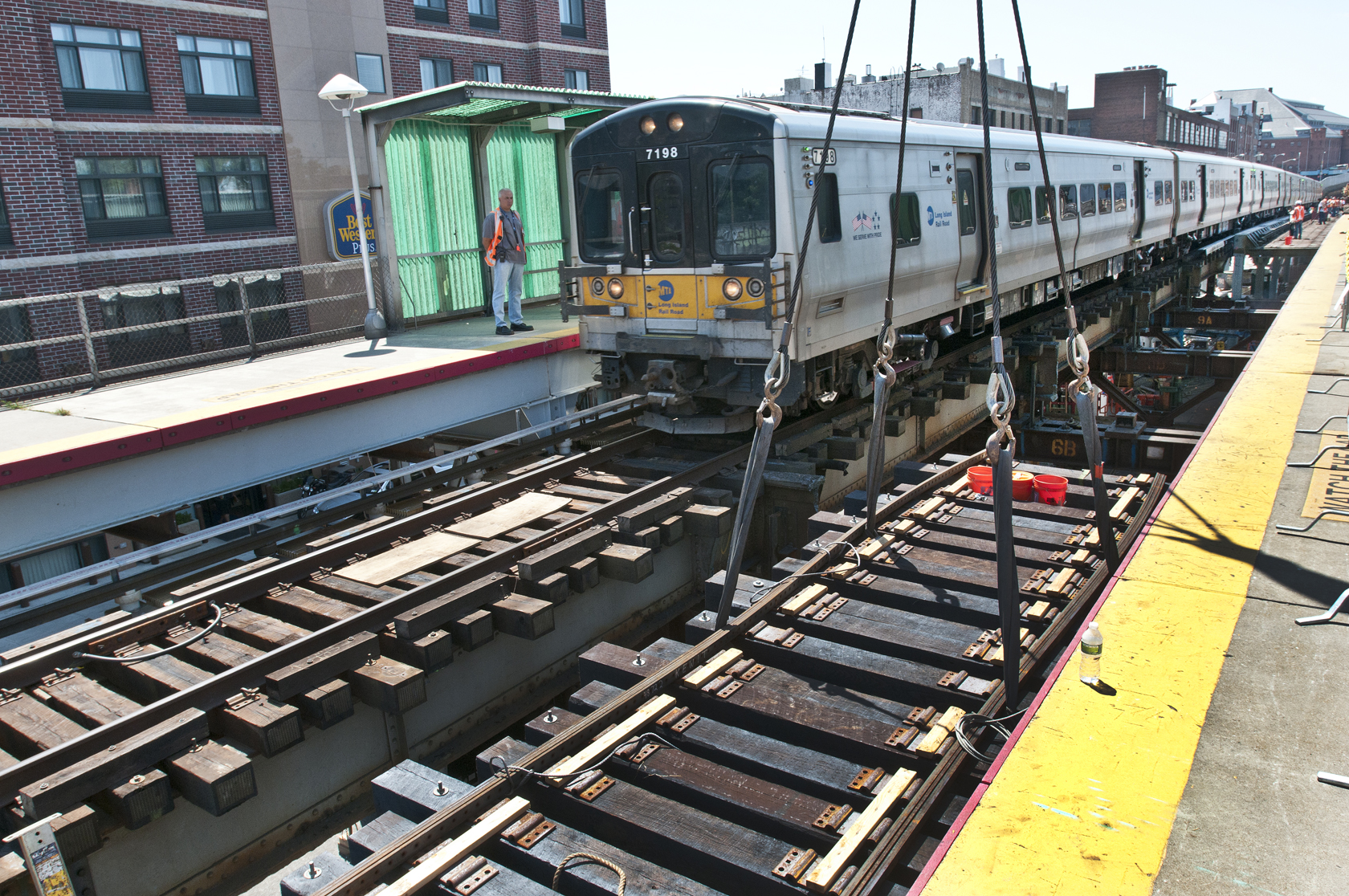
The Nostrand Avenue station of the Long Island Rail Road during reconstruction

Bedford–Stuyvesant is served by the New York City Subway's IND Fulton Street Line (A and C trains), which opened in 1936. This underground line replaced the earlier, elevated BMT Fulton Street Line on May 31, 1940. The BMT Franklin Avenue Line has provided service and connections to southern Brooklyn since opening as an excursion railroad in 1878. The IND Crosstown Line (G train), running underneath Lafayette Avenue and Marcy Avenue, opened for service in 1937.

The elevated BMT Jamaica Line (J, M, and Z trains) also serves the neighborhood, running alongside its northern boundary at Broadway. In the past, the elevated BMT Lexington Avenue Line served Lexington Avenue until 1950 and the elevated BMT Myrtle Avenue Line served Myrtle Avenue to the north until 1969.

Bedford–Stuyvesant is also served by the Nostrand Avenue station of the Long Island Rail Road.

Several bus routes, operated by MTA Regional Bus Operations, run through Bedford–Stuyvesant. The B7, B15, B43, B44, B44 SBS, B46, B46 SBS, B47, B48 and B49 routes run primarily north to south through the neighborhood, while the B25, B26, B38, B52, B54 and B57 run primarily west to east, and the Q24, B46, and B47 run northwest to southeast on Broadway.

== Notable people ==
- 6ix9ine (born 1996), rapper and songwriter.
- Aaliyah (1979–2001), Grammy-nominated singer.
- Aja (born 1994), drag queen and performer.
- Isaac Asimov (1920-1992), writer, attended Boys High School
- Big Daddy Kane (born 1968), rapper.
- Memphis Bleek (born 1978), rapper.
- Kurt Boone (born 1959), author known for his work documenting street culture
- Mark Breland (born 1963), boxer
- Foxy Brown (born 1978), rapper
- Lil Cease (born 1977), rapper
- Shirley Chisholm (1924–2005), congresswoman
- Aaron Copland (1900-1990), composer, attended Boys High School
- Imani Coppola (born 1978), singer-songwriter
- Alan Dale (1925–2002), singer and star of The Alan Dale Show
- Tommy Davis (1939–2022), professional baseball player and coach, who played in Major League Baseball as a left fielder and third baseman from 1959 to 1976 for ten different teams, most notably for the Los Angeles Dodgers
- Deemi (born 1980), singer
- Desiigner (born 1997), rapper
- Easy Mo Bee (born 1965), record producer
- Ansel Elgort (born 1994), actor and singer
- Nelson Erazo (born 1977), professional wrestler better known by his ring name Homicide
- Aprille Ericsson (born 1963), aerospace engineer
- Fabolous (born 1977), rapper
- Bobby Fischer (1943–2008), eleventh World Chess Champion
- William Forsythe (born 1955), actor
- Jackie Gleason (1916–87), actor, comedian
- Carl Gordon (1932–2010), actor
- Kadeem Hardison (born 1965), actor, portrays Dwayne Wayne on A Different World
- Richie Havens (1941–2013), musician and poet
- Connie Hawkins (1942–2017), Basketball Hall of Fame player
- Lena Horne (1917–2010), actress and singer
- Jay-Z (born 1969), rapper and entrepreneur, who lived in the Marcy Housing Projects for most of his childhood
- Jaz-O (born 1964), rapper
- Joey Badass (born 1995), rapper
- Norah Jones (born 1979), singer
- June Jordan (1936–2002), Caribbean American poet, novelist, journalist, biographer, dramatist, teacher and activist
- Wee Willie Keeler (1872–1923), Baseball Hall-of-Famer
- Brian Kokoska (born 1988), artist
- Lenny Kravitz (born 1964), musician
- Talib Kweli (born 1975), emcee
- Lil' Kim (born 1974), rapper
- Maino (born 1973), rapper
- Masta Ace (born 1966), rapper
- Frank McCourt (1930–2009), a writer, and Malachy McCourt (born 1931), an actor, writer and politician. Frank's autobiographical bestseller Angela's Ashes describes their early childhood life in a working-class apartment building on Classon Avenue
- Ralph McDaniels (born 1959), music video director.
- Frank Mickens (1946–2009), educator
- Stephanie Mills (born 1957), singer
- Sauce Money (born 1969), rapper
- Dianne Morales (born 1967), non-profit executive, 2021 mayoral candidate for New York City
- Tracy Morgan (born 1968), comedian and actor
- Mos Def (aka Yasiin Bey) (born 1973), rapper
- Ali Shaheed Muhammad (born 1970), DJ, producer and member of A Tribe Called Quest
- Jack Newfield (1938–2004), journalist
- Harry Nilsson (1941–1994), musician, songwriter and author
- The Notorious B.I.G. (born Christopher Wallace; also Biggie Smalls) (1972–1997), rapper, grew up near the Clinton Hill-Bed Stuy border.
- Oddisee (born 1985), rapper and producer
- Ol' Dirty Bastard (1968–2004), rapper
- Papoose (born 1978), rapper
- Floyd Patterson (1935–2006), boxer
- Martha M. Place (1849–1899), first woman to be put to death in the electric chair
- Max Roach (1924-2007), jazz dummer and composer, grew up at 541 Green Avenue; the intersection of Greenve and Marcy Avenues was renamed "Max Roach Way" in 2024
- Jackie Robinson (1919–1972), professional baseball player with the Brooklyn Dodgers
- Chris Rock (born 1965), actor/comedian Also made a TV series about his early life, with much of it based in Bedford-Stuyvesant.
- Tony Rock (born 1974), comedian and younger brother of Chris Rock
- Susanna Russell (1844-1894), first known female property developer in Brooklyn
- Gabourey Sidibe (born 1983), Academy Award-nominated actress
- Skyzoo (born 1982), rapper
- Brandon Stanton (born 1984), Humans of New York author and photographer
- Nelson Stevens (1938–2022), African-American painter and muralist
- Tek (born 1973), one half of Smif-N-Wessun
- Bill Thompson (born 1953), New York City 2013 Mayoral candidate
- Conrad Tillard (born 1964), politician, Baptist minister, radio host, author and civil rights activist
- Mike Tyson (born 1966), boxer, lived there with his family until the age of 10
- Martha Wainwright (born 1976), singer
- Dan Washburn (born 1973), author of The Forbidden Game: Golf and the Chinese Dream.
- Whodini, hip-hop group
- Lenny Wilkens (1937–2025), Basketball Hall of Fame player and coach
- Juan Williams (born 1954), journalist and political analyst
- Ted Williams (born 1957), voiceover artist
- Vanessa A. Williams (born 1963), actress

== In popular culture ==
- Billy Joel's 1980 song "You May Be Right", from his album Glass Houses, includes "I walked through Bedford-Stuy alone" among the foolhardy things the song's narrator has done.
- In her 1980 one-woman film Gilda Live, Gilda Radner included a sketch featuring her Emily Litella character working as a substitute teacher in Bedford-Stuyvesant, filling in for a teacher who'd been stabbed by one of his students.
- Do the Right Thing, a movie by Spike Lee, takes place in Bed–Stuy. In 2015, the portion of Stuyvesant Street where the film was shot was renamed "Do The Right Thing Way", marking the first time that a city street was given an honorary name for a movie filmed at a specific location.
- Notorious B.I.G., a rapper who included Bed–Stuy in his lyrics, "publicly claim[ed] Bedford-Stuyvesant as his neighborhood". A 2009 film, Notorious, about life in Bed–Stuy in the 1990s, emphasized Notorious B.I.G.
- The period television sitcom, Everybody Hates Chris is set in the Bed-Stuy neighborhood (which is where series creator Chris Rock's family lived in during the 1970s and 1980s). The show occasionally refers to the neighborhood by its often-used nickname "Bed-Stuy Do or Die".
- A selection from Black Enough; Stories of Being Young & Black in America, "The Ingredients" by Jason Reynolds, takes place in Bed-Stuy, involving a group of friends walking home from Kosciuszko Pool.
- Halsey, the American singer, mentions "Bed-Stuy" in her song "Hurricane".

== See also ==
- 13th Regiment Armory, former armory in Bed–Stuy
- Magnolia grandiflora (Brooklyn), a landmark tree in Bed–Stuy
