= Brooklyn Waldorf School =

Coordinates: 40.68255°N 73.95739°W

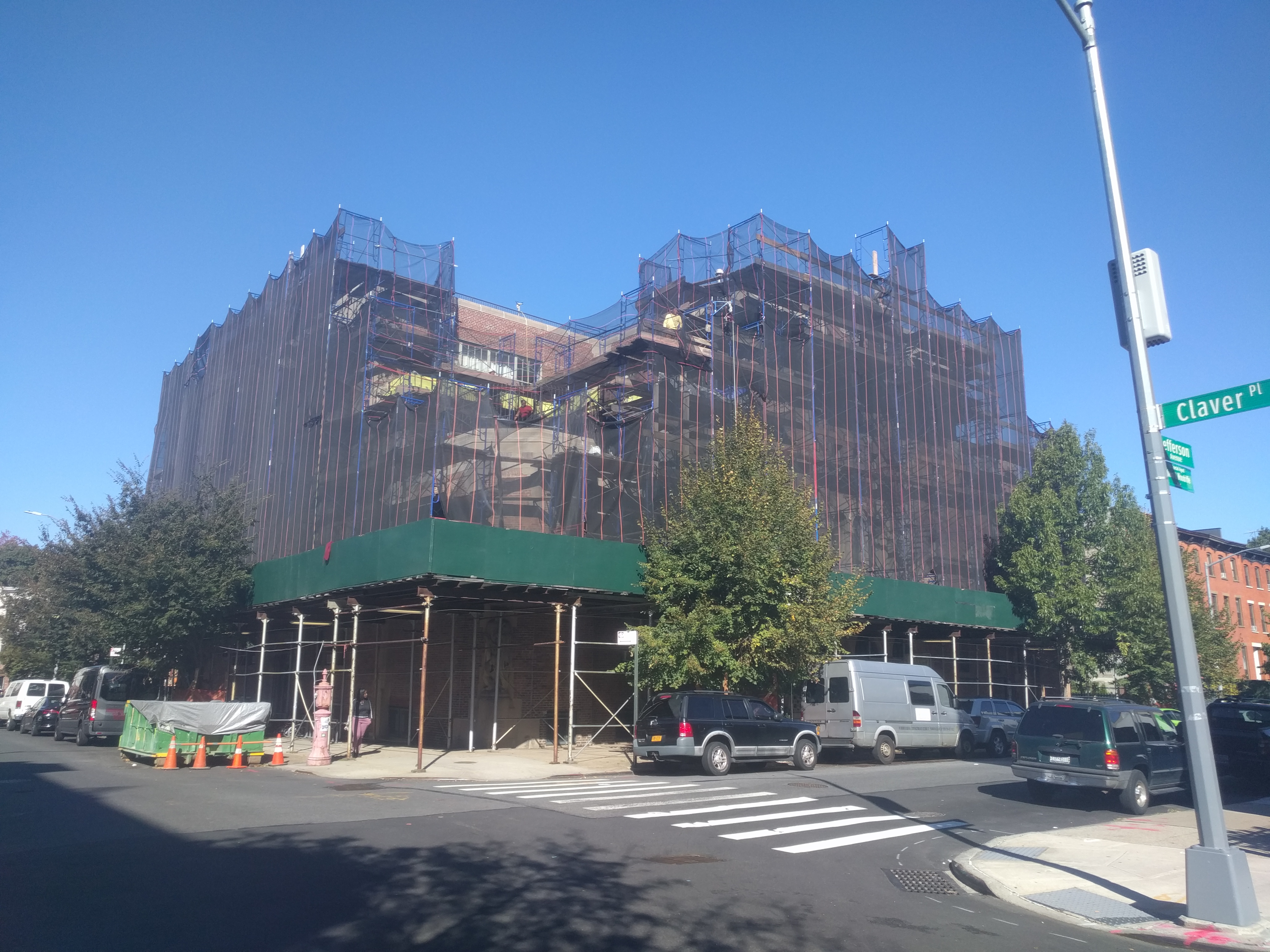
The Brooklyn Waldorf School under reconstruction in September 2019.

The Brooklyn Waldorf School is a coeducational, independent, non-sectarian day preschool and elementary Waldorf school located in Bedford-Stuyvesant, Brooklyn, New York. The school operates on the principles of Waldorf Education and adapts the traditional methods of Rudolf Steiner.

== Overview ==
Operating in the building of the former St. Peter Claver Institute since 2011, the school was founded in 2005 and currently has a preschool/kindergarten and grades 1–8.

The school strives to maintain an active and mindful presence within Bedford-Stuyvesant through partnerships with local organizations, such as St. Martin de Porres/St. Peter Claver Catholic Church, and the public events the school organizes, such as Community Basketball nights and various cultural workshops, including social justice training.

The Brooklyn Waldorf School is a “developing status” member of the Association of Waldorf Schools of North America (AWSNA).

== See also ==
- Curriculum of the Waldorf schools
