= Bed-Stuy Aquarium =

Makeshift goldfish pond in New York City

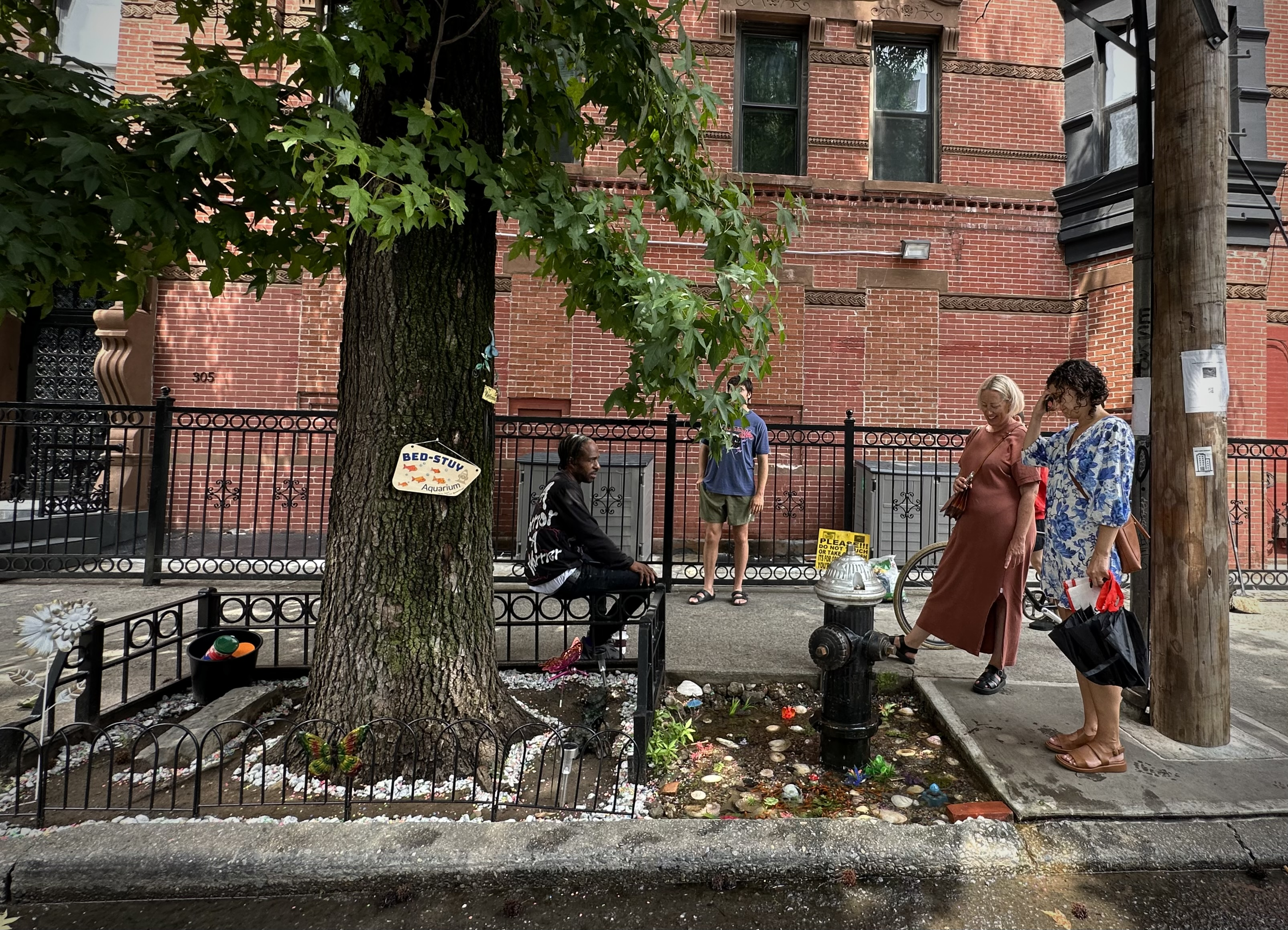
- Founder Hajj Lovick (left) with community members at the Bed-Stuy Aquarium, August 2024

- Location of Bed-Stuy Aquarium in Brooklyn, New York
- Interactive map of Bed-Stuy Aquarium
- Location: Hancock Street and Tompkins Avenue, Bedford-Stuyvesant, Brooklyn, New York
- Coordinates: 40°40′59.9″N 73°56′38.6″W
- Type: Makeshift aquarium
- Primary inflows: Leaking fire hydrant
- Basin countries: United States
- Built: July 30, 2024
- Construction engineer: Hajj-Malik Lovick (local resident)
- Average depth: 6 in (150 mm)
- Settlements: New York City

The Bed-Stuy Aquarium (also known as the Hancock Street Bed-Stuy Aquarium) was a makeshift goldfish pond located on a sidewalk in the Bedford-Stuyvesant, Brooklyn neighborhood of New York City. The pond, originally formed by a puddle from a leaky fire hydrant, garnered attention from locals and the press at the time of its creation in August 2024. Local residents populated the shallow water with goldfish and colorful trinkets, transforming it into an unexpected community attraction. The project has since become the subject of both praise and criticism, with debates about animal welfare, urban beautification, and gentrification surrounding the installation.

The New York City Department of Environmental Protection paved over the space around the hydrant in the morning on October 25, 2024. A new aquarium located next to the hydrant was built days later, but was closed in December because it could not function in winter conditions. In June 2025, a fish tank was placed on a tree pit nearby the initial location, serving as a replacement for the original aquarium.

The Bed-Stuy Aquarium is featured in the 2026 documentary film The History of Concrete.

== Origins ==
The Bed-Stuy Aquarium was initiated in early August 2024 when Hajj-Malik Lovick, a lifelong resident of the Bedford-Stuyvesant neighborhood, and his friends Gav and Je-Quan Irving, decided to transform a puddle into an aquarium. This puddle, formed by a leaky hydrant, was initially an eyesore, but the founders fortified its edges with bricks and stones and introduced about 100 goldfish, purchased for $16 from a local pet store.

== Development and challenges ==
=== Early popularity and criticism ===
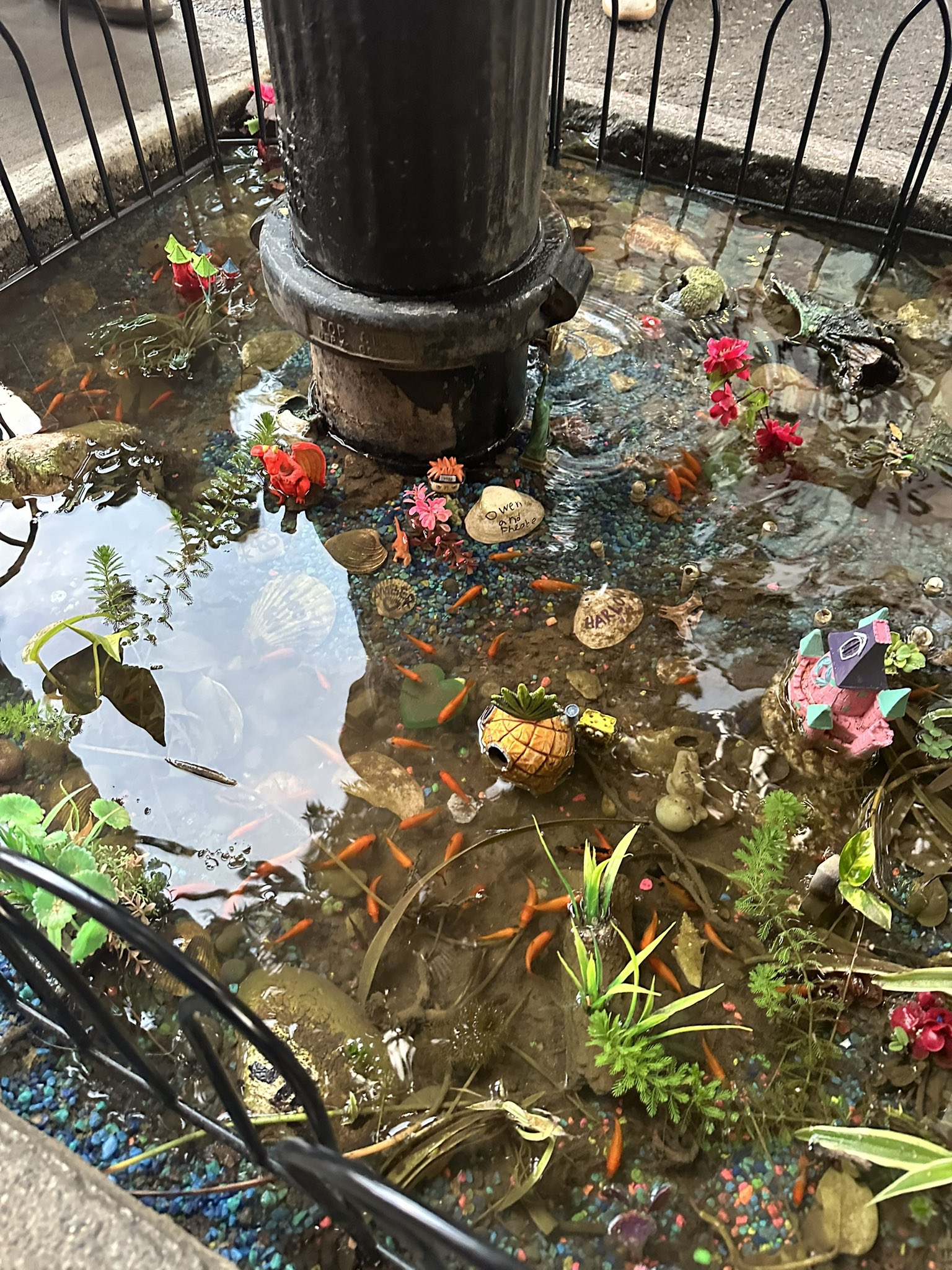
The original Bedstuy Aquarium in September 2024

Since its inception, the Bed-Stuy Aquarium has drawn both praise and concern from residents and authorities. Many locals regard the pond as a public art project that has brought the community together, offering a space for neighbors to gather, converse, and enjoy a rare moment of tranquility in a bustling city. Visitors from across the city and beyond have come to see the fish, contributing to the aquarium's viral fame on social media.

The pond has also raised concerns regarding the welfare of the fish. Veterinarian Benjamin Rosenbloom, founder of Wet Pet Vet, has voiced strong opposition to keeping goldfish in such conditions, calling it animal abuse due to the shallow depth, temperature fluctuations, and the presence of chlorinated water.

The New York City Department of Environmental Protection (DEP) repeatedly shut off the hydrant feeding the pond due to concerns about water pressure and the risk of hindering firefighting operations. Despite these efforts, locals had reopened the hydrant to maintain the pond.

=== Gentrification and social tensions ===
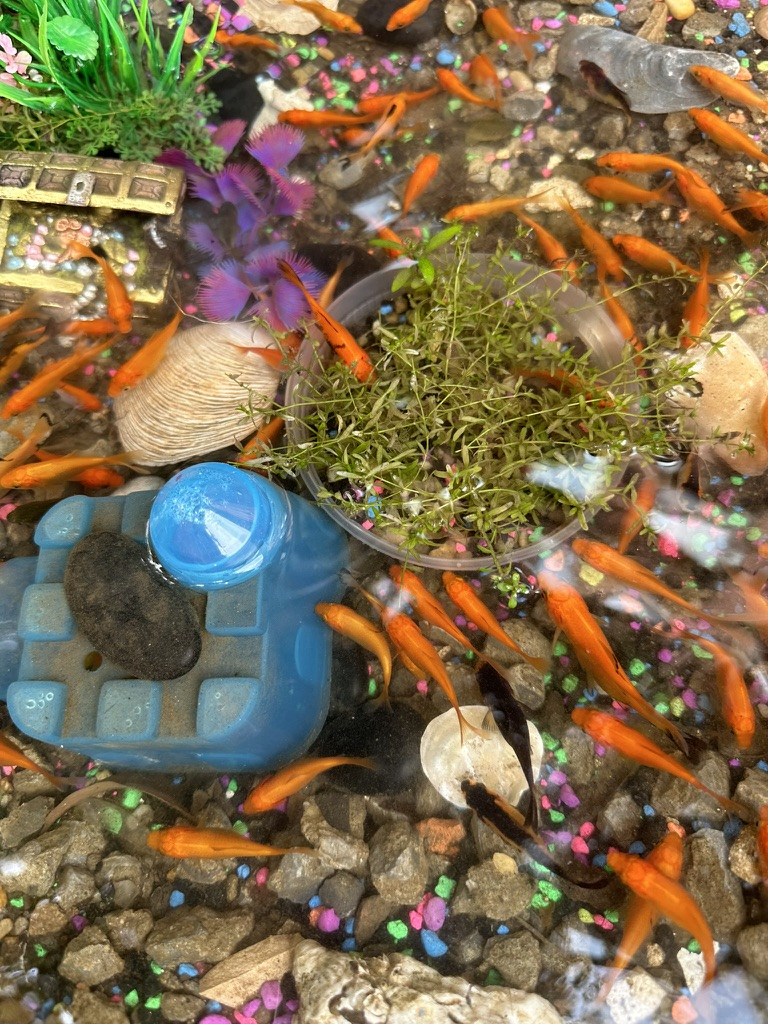
Close-up showing goldfish, aquatic plants, and colorful pebbles in the Bed-Stuy Aquarium

The Bed-Stuy Aquarium highlighted the broader social tensions surrounding gentrification in the neighborhood. Some long-term residents view the project as a symbol of unity and community resilience, while others, particularly newer residents, have raised concerns about animal welfare. In one notable incident, two residents attempted to remove some of the fish, citing cruelty, sparking a larger debate about the neighborhood's changing dynamics.

The founders of the aquarium, all long-time Bed-Stuy residents, describe the project as a truly local-led initiative—a site of resistance in the face of the rapid gentrification reshaping their neighborhood.

=== Controversy ===
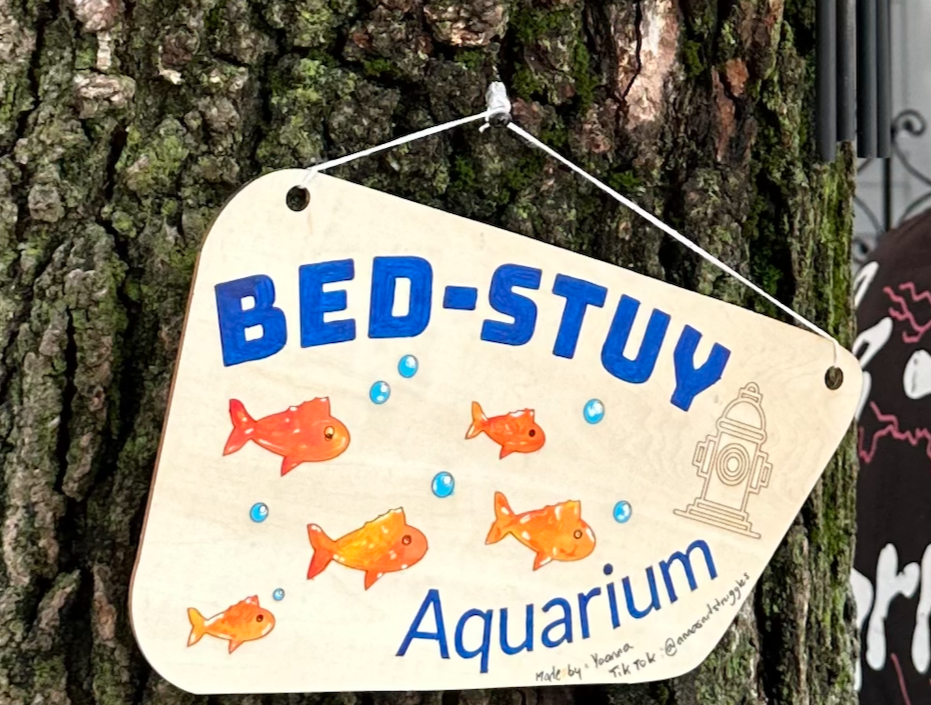
Hand-painted Bed-Stuy Aquarium sign, hanging on tree beside original aquarium

In January 2025, co-founder Hajj Lovick was sentenced to 12 years in prison after being convicted of second-degree attempted murder, reckless endangerment, and illegal possession of a weapon following an altercation in June 2023. He was out on bail when the aquarium was conceptualized. The Bed-Stuy Aquarium committee affirms Hajj's vision as integral to a broader framework of restorative justice.

== Reinstallation and closure ==
=== Reinstallation in the tree bed ===
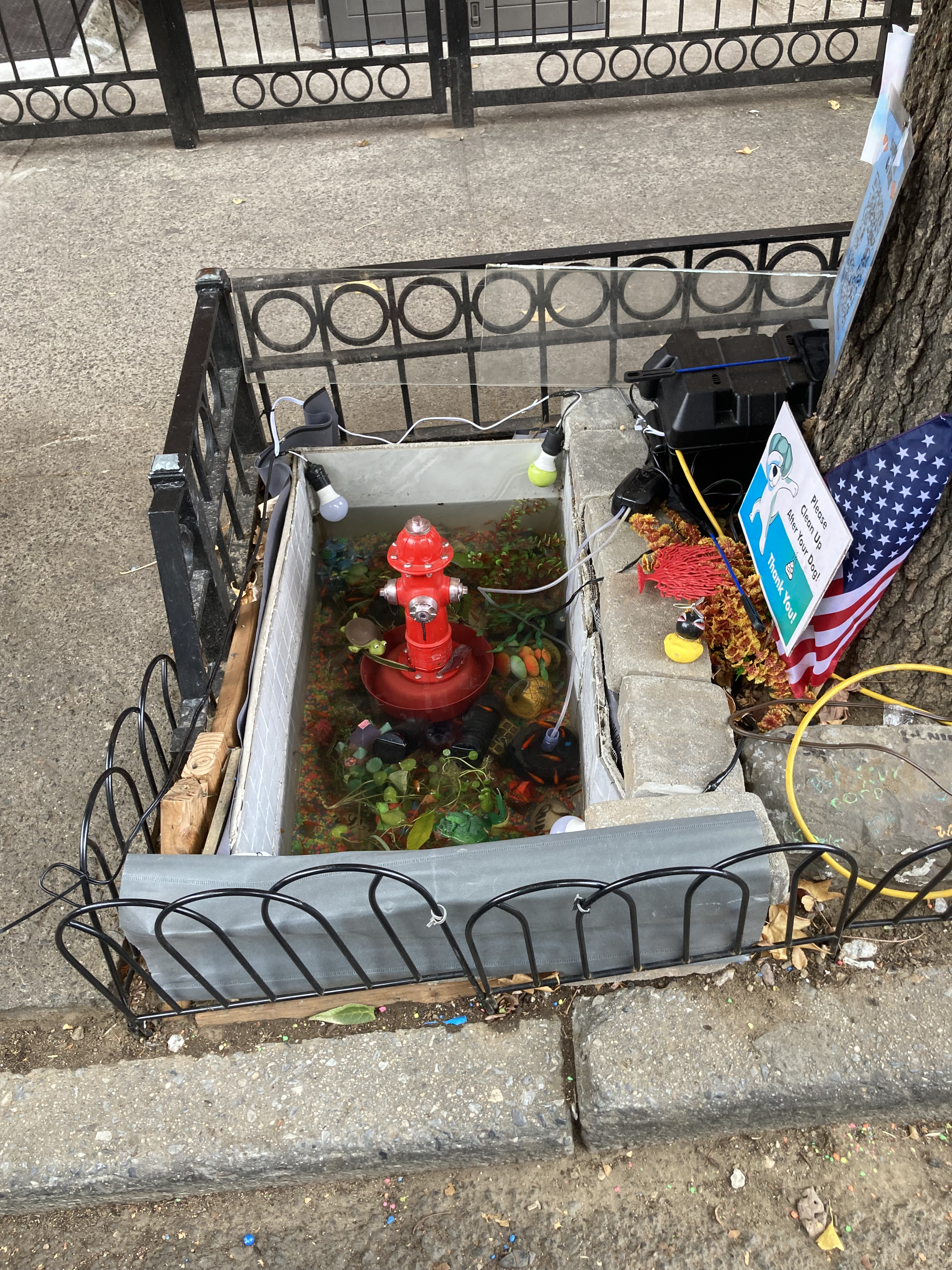
Bed-Stuy Aquarium after the destruction of the first pond, with added lighting, decorations, and a toy fire hydrant referencing the original location

As summer 2024 came to a close, the future of the Bed-Stuy Aquarium remained uncertain. The project's creators expressed their intent to keep the pond running and are fundraising to install a filtration system and plexiglass cover to sustain the fish during the colder months. However, in October, a NYC Department of Environmental Protection crew paved over the original aquarium. Officials cited safety concerns, and did not want the pond to freeze and render the hydrant inoperable. Not all fish were removed before the incident.

The aquarium was subsequently reinstalled by residents in a nearby tree bed. The new location required more upkeep, as it could not rely on a constant stream of fresh water that it received under the leaky hydrant. An additional filtration system was required. Benches, chairs, and other decorations were added to the site.

=== Winter closure ===
In December 2024, the aquarium was closed after it was threatened by ice and snow. Thirty fish were said to be rescued from the freezing pond and relocated. The incident re-sparked conversations about the mistreatment of the fish, and it was reported that the project had been the subject of 311 reports of animal abuse since August. A new glass tank was opened in June 2025 in a neighboring location.
