= Brooklyn Community Board 3 =

Brooklyn Community District 3
- Community District
- Country: United States
- State: New York
- City: New York City
- Borough: Brooklyn
- Neighborhoods: List: Bedford–Stuyvesant; Ocean Hill

Government
  - Chairperson: Richard Flateau
  - District Manager: Henry L. Butler

Area
  - Total: 2.9 sq mi (7.5 km^{2})

Population (2020)
  - Total: 174,960 ▲
  - Density: 60,000/sq mi (23,000/km^{2})

Ethnicity
  - Black: 43.8%
  - White: 26.6%
  - Hispanic and Latino (any race): 18.7%
  - Asian: 4.5%
  - Others: 6.2%
- Time zone: UTC−5 (Eastern)
  - Summer (DST): UTC−4 (EDT)
- ZIP codes: 11205, 11206, 11216, 11221, 11233, and 11238
- Area code: 718, 347, 929, and 917
- Police Precincts: 79th (website); 81st (website)
- Website: www1.nyc.gov/site/brooklyncb3/index.page

Brooklyn Community Board 3 is a New York City community board that encompasses the Brooklyn neighborhoods of Bedford–Stuyvesant, Stuyvesant Heights and Ocean Hill. It is delimited by Classon Avenue on the west, Flushing Avenue and Broadway on the north, and Saratoga Avenue on the east, as well as by Atlantic Avenue on the south.

Its current chairman is Richard Flateau, and its district manager is Henry Butler, president of the Vanguard Independent Democratic Association.

As of the 2000 U.S. census, the Board covered a population of 143,387, up from 138,696 in 1990 and 133,377 in 1980.
Of them (as of 2000), 2,056 (1.4%) are White non-Hispanic, 110,431 (76.8%) are African-American, 1,457 (1.0%) Asian or Pacific Islander, 432(0.3%) American Indian or Native Alaskan, 473 (0.3%) of some other race, 2,998 (2.1%) of two or more race, 26,020 (18.1%) of Hispanic origins.
44.9% of the population benefit from public assistance as of 2004, up from 32.7% in 2000. The land area is 1,894.4 acres (7.666 km^{2}).

== Demographics ==
Historical population
Census	Pop.	Note	%±
1980	133,377		—
1990	138,696		4.0%
2000	143,867		3.7%
2010	152,985		6.3%
2020	174,960		14.4%
U.S. Decennial Census

Brooklyn Community Board 3 recorded a population of 174,960 in the 2020 United States census, a 14% increase since the 2010 United States census, when the figure stood at 152,985.

Population by race as of 2000, 2010 and 2020 censuses:
Race	2000		2010		2020	
Black	110,431	76.76%	98,780	64.57%	76,676	43.82%
White	2,056	1.43%	16,634	10.87%	46,592	26.63%
Asian	1,457	1.01%	3,458	2.26%	7,988	4.56%
Other	905	0.63%	986	0.64%	2,542	1.45%
Multiracial	2,998	2.08%	2,639	1.73%	8,374	4.78%
Hispanic (any race)	26,020	18.09%	30,488	19.93%	32,788	18.74%
Total	143,867	100%	152,985	100%	174,960	100%
