= Hattie Carthan =

American community activist and environmentalist

- Born: September 7, 1900
- Died: April 22, 1984 (aged 83); Brooklyn, New York
- Occupation: Community activist
- Years active: 1964–1984

Hattie Carthan (September 7, 1900 – April 22, 1984) was an American community activist and environmentalist who was instrumental in improving the quality of life of the Brooklyn, New York community of Bedford-Stuyvesant.

== Biography ==
Originally from Washington, DC, she moved to Brooklyn in 1928. After she and her husband split, she remarried in 1943. She later separated from her second husband in 1954 while working as a field interviewer for a market research company.

Carthan moved to the tree-lined block of Vernon Avenue between Tompkins Ave and Throop Ave in Bedford-Stuyvesant in 1953. By 1964, only three trees remained due to the deterioration of the neighborhood at that time. She sent postcards to everyone on her block and formed the T & T Vernon Avenue Block Association, which raised funds to buy and plant trees by throwing block parties. The City of New York supported her efforts: Mayor John Lindsay attended one of the block parties, and the City Parks Department provided trees under its tree matching program.

Carthan founded the Bedford-Stuyvesant Beautification Committee in 1966. As chairman of the organization, the Beautification Committee was awarded a grant in 1971 to teach youth about tree care and provide a stipend for summer work, known as the Neighborhood Tree Corps. She oversaw over 100 block associations which planted over 1,500 trees including those of the ginkgo, sycamore, and honeylocust varieties.

When a 40-foot Magnolia grandiflora tree that was thriving far north of its natural habitat, was threatened to be cut down for an apartment complex in 1968, Carthan spearheaded a campaign to save the tree. She raised the funds to construct a protective wall behind the tree to shield it from a planned parking lot and it was designated by City Landmarks Preservation Commission as a living landmark. The remaining brownstones intended to be torn down for the apartment complex were purchased in 1976 for $1,200 and became the Magnolia Tree Earth Center of Bedford- Stuyvesant Inc, an educational center.

In 1975, she was honored by Parks Commissioner Edwin L. Weisl Jr. for distinguished service to the city of New York.

== Death and legacy ==
Carthan died on April 22, 1984, in Bedford-Stuyvesant.

=== Hattie Carthan Community Garden Farm ===
In 1985, a vacant lot started to be revitalized into a community garden which eventually was renamed Hattie Carthan Garden in 1998 to honor and continue the work of Hattie Carthan. In 2009, under Yonnette Fleming's leadership, the garden expanded to become the Hattie Carthan Community Garden Farm.
