= Magnolia grandiflora (Brooklyn) =

Historic tree

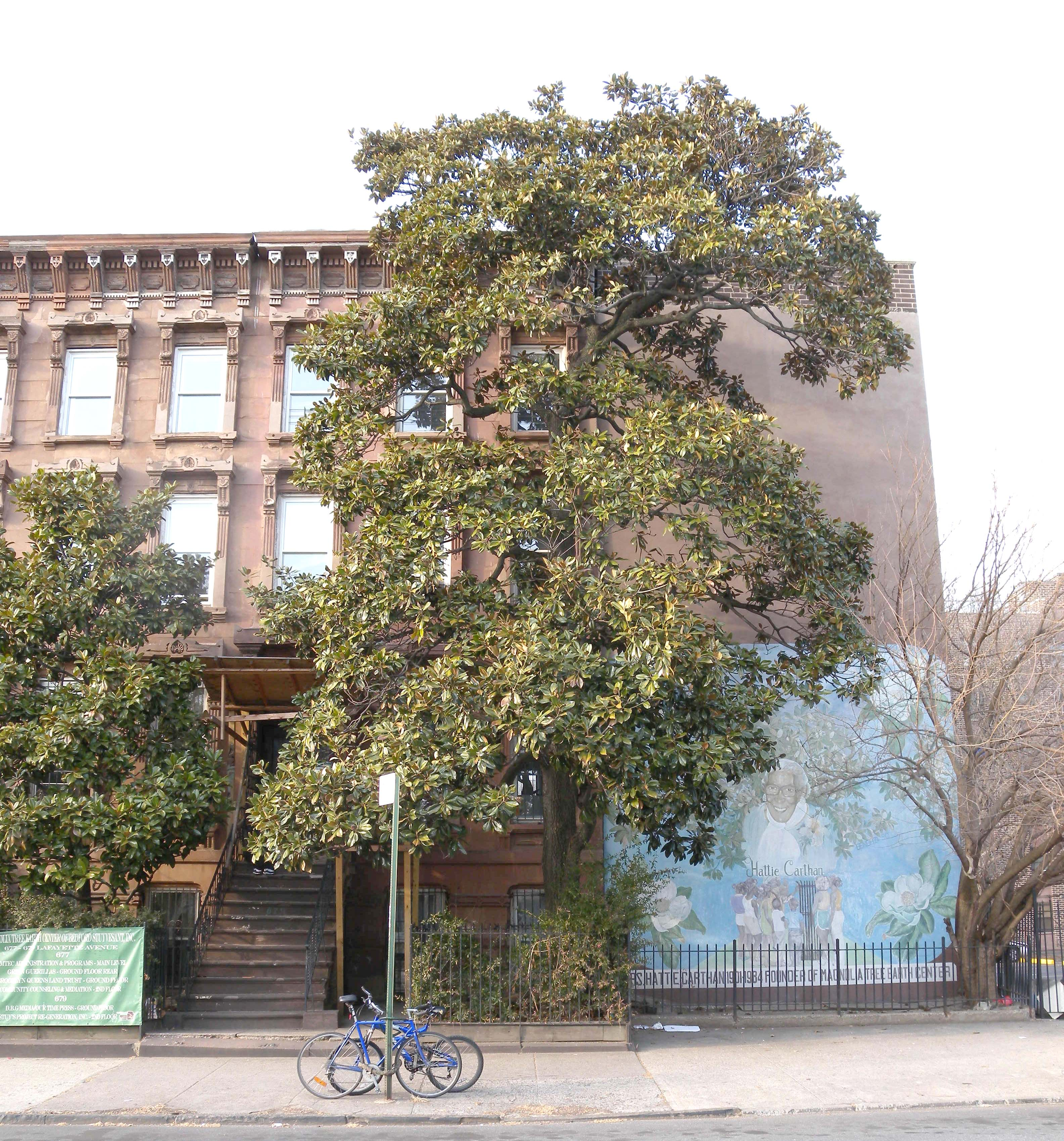
- The magnolia in 2009

- Location within New York City
- 40.6905°N 73.9467°W
- Location: 679 Lafayette Avenue, Brooklyn, New York City

Site notes
- Governing body: Magnolia Tree Earth Center

New York City Landmark
- Designated: May 12, 1977
- Reference no.: 0957

The Magnolia grandiflora is a historic tree at 679 Lafayette Avenue in Bedford–Stuyvesant, Brooklyn, New York City. The specimen is a rare example of a flourishing laurel magnolia growing as far north as New York, having been brought as a seedling from North Carolina and planted around 1885 by William Lemken. It is one of two trees that were made New York City designated landmarks; the other was the now-felled Weeping Beech in Flushing, Queens.

Beginning in the 1970s, it was protected by Hattie Carthan, who enlisted neighborhood schoolchildren to help raise money to protect the tree, which was threatened by the construction of a parking lot. After the tree was made as a landmark, Carthan founded Magnolia Tree Earth Center, a nonprofit focused on urban beautification and environmental awareness. The center is housed in the brownstone adjacent to the tree.

== See also ==
- List of individual trees
- List of New York City Designated Landmarks in Brooklyn
