= Brian Kokoska =

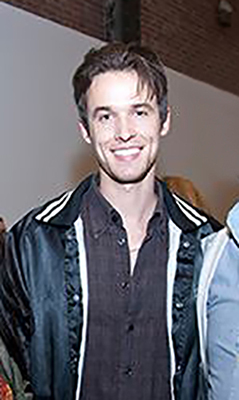
- Brian Kokoska at SculptureCenter in New York City, 2014
- Born: November 8, 1988 (age 37); Vancouver, British Columbia, Canada
- Education: Emily Carr University of Art and Design
- Known for: Contemporary artist, Painter, Installation artist, New media artist, Multimedia artist, Sculptor
- Website: Official website

Brian Kokoska (born November 8, 1988, in Vancouver, British Columbia) is a New York-based artist known for his paintings, sculptures and installations.

== Education ==
Kokoska received his BFA from Vancouver's Emily Carr University of Art and Design in 2010.

== Work ==
Brian is recognized for his paintings of faces, flowers, masks, text and other scenery. He also makes monochromatic sculptural installations that incorporate heads, pedestals and acquired objects. New York art writer Christopher Eamon described Kokoska's work as the exception to "the abject in American art [having] had its apotheosis in the early 1990s in the work of Mike Kelley and Cindy Sherman."

== Exhibitions ==
Selected solo and group exhibitions include American Medium (New York), Preteen Gallery (Mexico City), Arcadia Missa (London), and The Still House Group (Brooklyn).
