= Susanna Russell =

Susanna Edith Cosey Russell (also known as S.E.C. Russell; c. 1844 - March 14, 1894) was an American architect, builder, and property developer. She was the first known female developer in Brooklyn, New York, and among the few women working as architects or builders there in the late 19th-century.

== Early life ==
Susanna was born in England. She married Walter C. Russell, also England-born, and by the 1860s was living in Manhattan. By the time of the 1870 census, the couple were living in Brooklyn, with Susanna having real estate valued at $20,000. Susanna Russell became a naturalized citizen of the United States in 1879.

== Career ==
Although there were likely other women builders during Brooklyn's early history, Cosey is the first known named example. In 1871, she and Walter completed Brooklyn's earliest row houses: five wood-framed properties at 276 to 284 Monroe Street. Between 1871 and 1892, the Russells built nearly 90 row houses in the Bedford Historic District. Susanna Russell was listed as the “owner, architect, and builder” for five rows constructed between 1878 and 1882 in the district, and as “owner and builder” of two houses at 186 and 188 Hancock Street designed by Isaac D. Reynolds. She was also the architect of other projects led by developers other than her or her husband.

Susanna was listed as a builder in the 1884 Brooklyn City Directory independently of Walter. She was mistakenly referred to on several occasions by the Brooklyn Eagle as "Mr" S.E.C. Russell.

== Death and legacy ==
Walter C. Russell died in 1893 and Susanna in 1894.
