= Theron =

Theron (/ˈθɪərɒn/ THEER-on, /θəˈroʊn/) is a surname of Occitan origin (from place-names Théron, Thérond [terɔ̃] variant form of *Thoron — same as Le Thor (Vaucluse, Torum 1029) — from PIE *tur- or Latin torus "height"), and a given name in English. It may refer to:

== Given name ==
- Theron of Acragas (died 473 BC), 5th century BC tyrant of Acragas, Sicily
- Theron Akin (1855–1933), U.S. Representative from New York
- Theron Baldwin (1801–1870), American Congregational minister
- Theron C. Bennett (1879–1937), American pianist, ragtime composer, and music publisher
- Theron Cooper (born 1974), Bahamian sprinter
- Theron S. Copeland (1831–1905), American law enforcement officer
- Theron Drew (1900–1978), American LDS schismatic
- Theron Ephron Catlin (1878–1960), U.S. Representative from Missouri
- Theron Feemster, American record producer, songwriter, musician, and singer
- Theron J. Fouts (1893–1954), American football player and coach
- Theron Hale (1883–1954), American old-time fiddle and banjo player
- Theron Lyman (1869–1939), American football player and coach
- Theron Lynd (1920–1978), American circuit clerk, who was subject of six year of legal issues for voter discrimination
- Theron Metcalf (1784–1875), New England jurist and judge
- Theron W. Mortimer (1872–1952), American football player and coach
- Theron Newell (1916–1993), American writer
- Theron R. Perlee (1824–1894), American soldier and politician
- Theron T. Pond (1800–1852), American pharmacist and businessman
- Theron Randolph, MD (1906–1995), founder of the holistic field of environmental illness and medicine known as clinical ecology
- Theron Read (1964–2009), American film actor
- Theron Moses Rice (1829–1895), U.S. Representative from Missouri
- Theron Sapp (born 1935), former American football running back
- Theron Smith (born 1963), American cartoonist and designer
- Theron Smith (born 1980), American professional basketball player
- Theron Strinden (1919–2011), American politician and businessman
- Theron R. Strong (1802–1873), American politician and lawyer
- Theron Wasson (1887–1970), American petroleum geologist and engineer
- Theron Wood (born 1990), Caymanian footballer

== Surname ==
- Annique Theron (1929–2016), South African businesswoman
- Charlize Theron (born 1975), South African actress
- Daniel Theron (1872–1900), Boer officer
- Dawie Theron (born 1966), former South African rugby union player
- Duimpie Theron (born 1979), former Namibian rugby union player
- Gus Theron (born 1975), former South African rugby union player
- Hendrik Schalk Theron (1869–1922), South African mining engineer and politician
- Inge Theron (born 1976), London-based South African skincare specialist and former radio personality
- Jan Theron (1930–1993), South African wrestler
- Jean-Paul Theron (born 1950s), former French doctor
- Johan Theron (born c. 1943), former South African government information officer
- Johan Theron (born 1975), former Namibian tennis player
- Juan "Rusty" Theron (born 1985), South African cricketer
- Leo Theron (1926–2010), South African stained-glass window artist
- Leona Theron (born 1966), South African Constitutional Court judge
- Liesl Theron (born 1970s), South African trans activist
- Liniques Theron (born 1995), former Namibian female tennis player
- Nelius Theron (born 1997), Namibian rugby union player
- Paul Theron (born 1966), South African asset manager
- Servaas Theron (1918–1986), South African World War II fighter pilot

== Other uses ==
- Theron Mountains, Coats Land, Antarctica
- Therons, a race of fictional aliens in the Dan Dare stories
- The Damnation of Theron Ware, 1896 novel by Harold Frederic
- Potnia Theron, ancient art motif
- Ptolemais Theron, ancient Greek marketplace in Africa
- MV Theron, later named MV Eurabia Sun, a Dutch-Lebanese merchant ship
- Theron (Tempest), one of the dogs of the hunter Actaeon. Like the rest of the pack, he also devoured his master when he was transformed into a stag by Artemis, goddess of the hunt.
