= Heystek =

- Current region: Netherlands, South Africa, United States, Canada
- Earlier spellings: Heijstek, Hijstek, Hystek, Heistek, Heijstekq, Heysteck, Heijsteck, Heijstexck
- Origin: Uitwijk, North Brabant, Netherlands

Heystek is a Dutch name. It may refer to:

- Joost van der Westhuizen Heystek, a former South African rugby union footballer.
- Annique Theron, a South African businesswoman best known for her line of cosmetics and health care products.
