= The Burke Group =

U.S.-based international management consulting firm

- Industry: Management consulting firm
- Founded: 1982; 44 years ago
- Founder: Steven J Burke Sr.
- Headquarters: Canberra, Australia; Casper, Wyoming, United States; Los Angeles, United States; London, United Kingdom
- Area served: International
- Website: Official website

The Burke Group is a U.S.-based international management consulting firm. Formally known as Burke International and founded in 1982 by Steven J Burke Sr., the company has headquarters in Canberra, Australia; Casper, Wyoming, United States; Los Angeles, United States and London, United Kingdom.

The Burke Group describes itself as an "international leader" in guiding management during union recognition campaigns. It provides commercial services to private and public employers. Services are also offered toward business development and leadership training.

Critics of The Burke Group call the firm's practices professional union busting.

== Business ==
The Burke Group Labor assists employers in union busting. According to its U.S. website, employees considering a trade union:

"Employees want and deserve to hear both pro employer and pro union arguments in order to make an informed choice before voting in a union election. A union organizer is experienced at running a union membership campaign whereas employers have little if any experience on how to respond to them when this activity presents itself. Once union activity becomes apparent, employers generally seek TBG and/or legal counsel in order to be better able to respond accurately and lawfully to employees."

Although their business has reportedly been international in scope since its inception, their services increased in the EU "after the Employee Relations Act 1999 (ERA 1999) was established in June 2000 and triggered new procedures related to trade union recognition and ballot elections". UK employers may seek the services of labor relations consultants such as The Burke Group and/or legal counsel to assist them thru the new law's complexities regarding automatic recognition or subsequent ballot elections. "Human Rights Watch does not take the position that employer silence is required under international standards. Rather, non-interference is required by international standards." As stated by Dr. John Logan: "Britain has a “hybrid” system of union recognition: employers can recognize the union without a demonstration of majority support, or, if the employers refuse voluntary recognition, the Central Arbitration Committee can recognize the union on the basis of documentary evidence of union membership or by holding a ballot election."

When direct communications known as third party persuading are requested, The Burke Group recommends its U.S. clients work with Labor Information Services, where David J Burke is also CEO. This service provides workers a chance to talk "directly" with professional consultants during organizing campaigns which allows questions and answers from sources other than professional union organizers. "Direct communications with employees during union activity must be conducted in strict accordance with the definitions and guidelines provided within the Landrum-Griffin Act known as the Labor Management Reporting and Disclosure Act passed by the U.S. Congress in 1959. It requires detailed reporting of all monies paid for third party activities be provided via Form LM10 which is later posted for public record."

According to their webpage, Labor Information Services is necessary because "the increase of non English speaking workers throughout U.S. industries has made communications (third party persuading) to a company's workforce a major challenge. The supervisors and managers at most companies are not bi-lingual, they do not know the law (National Labor Relations Act) nor can they be expected to answer employee questions in the short time frame of a union organizing campaign." Labor Information Services consultants are fluent in English, Spanish, Tagalog, French, Portuguese, Vietnamese, and a number of varieties of Chinese.

== AFL-CIO and TUC Agreement on anti-union activities of U.S. firms ==
A report released in 2008 called "US Union Avoidance Consultants: A Threat to the Rights of British Workers" commissioned by the Trades Union Congress (UK) to coincide with their joint announcement with the AFL-CIO (USA) of their campaign to thwart employer efforts which they claimed "demonise trade unions and scare employees from joining up." The campaign criticised companies which employ consultancies during recognition campaigns and ballot elections. The report examined tactics allegedly used by U.S. consultants and law firms, including detailed descriptions of Burke Group and clients in the UK.

In response, a Burke Group press release noted, the "report was biased and misleading based on subjective partisan research for which no request has ever been made to TBG nor its clients to review the veracity of the statements/conclusions contained therein before going to print."

== Trademark issues ==
Burke International acquired and enforced the US trademark for rooibos, despite it being a common name for the herb in the region, and used it to extort money from tea cafés and online sellers of the herbal tea from 2001 to 2005, demanding US$5000 each time. Burke acquired the trademark from retiring former client Annique Theron, and was met with a lawsuit and contesting trademark from Rooibos Limited in 2002. Discontent with Burke's aggressive enforcement on the trademark, other tea distributors and retailers supported Rooibos Limited in the lawsuit, leading to a settlement which dissolved the trademark in 2005.

== Cable and Wireless Case Study ==
In May 2007, the Communication Workers Union in the UK petitioned Cable and Wireless for "automatic recognition" of their Field Service team by filing form 1A which defines and describes the potential unit to the Central Arbitration Committee. After review, the Central Arbitration Committee sanctioned the unit. However Cable and Wireless Worldwide decided to challenge the decision due to the relatively small size of the unit and concerns about potential fragmentation.

In August 2007, reps employed by the Communication Workers Union were assigned at Cable and Wireless to provide guidance to employees regarding joining their union. Cable and Wireless also employed reps to provide guidance to Cable and Wireless management. But according to an article in The Guardian, the Communication Workers Union expressed "shock" saying that such hiring "can only lead to an atmosphere of bitterness and resentment."

In April 2008, after a review of the “appropriate bargaining unit”, the Central Arbitration Committee ordered a workforce ballot election process (as opposed to automatic recognition) as the best way to decide the most appropriate form of representation. The subsequent ballot election resulted in a 92% turnout of the Cable and Wireless Field Services team where 77% voted against the Communication Worker's Union as their representative for collective bargaining.

In May 2009, to dispute the outcome of the ballot election, the Communication Workers Union filed a complaint to the Central Arbitration Committee and The Joint Committee on Human Rights. Annotated from evidence presented at the hearing:

“The Burke Group (TBG) was engaged by Cable and Wireless to advise them on the statutory recognition process because it was complex and unfamiliar to Cable and Wireless. TBG helped Cable and Wireless to implement a 'fact-based' approach to the ballot process which enabled managers to inform their teams about the union recognition process and what it would mean for them. The Burke Group did not engage directly with employees in the bargaining unit, and they supported the ballot process. Both Cable and Wireless and the Communication Workers Union had equal access to employees and colleagues during the 20 day ballot process.”
