= Walter L. Durack =

American politician

Walter Lysaght Durack (July 9, 1857 – December 14, 1918) was an American lawyer, politician, and judge in New York.

== Life ==
Durack was born on July 9, 1857, in New York City. He was the son of Michael and Mary Durack.

Durack attended New York University School of Law, graduating from there in 1885. After graduating, he began to practice law in Brooklyn. He became identified with the building-loan associations in the city and state, and was president of the Metropolitan League of Saving and Loans Associations. He was also prominent in real estate law and Torrens law. He formed a law partnership with James P. Judge in 1891 called Judge & Durrack. The practice dissolved in 1907, and he later practiced law with his son Walter L. Durack, Jr. He lived in Bay Ridge since around 1900.

In 1892, Durack was elected to the New York State Assembly as a Democrat, representing the Kings County 16th District. He served in the Assembly in 1893. He was elected a city magistrate at-large in 1901, but after serving for about a year the New York Court of Appeals ruled he and several others were not legally entitled to hold the position. In 1913, he unsuccessfully ran for County Clerk.

In 1882, Durack married Selina Williamson. Their children were Selina A., Lucille, Walter L., Jr., and Victor J. He was a member of the Catholic Benevolent Legion, the Royal Arcanum, and the Knights of Columbus.

Durack died at home from a heart attack on December 14, 1918. He was buried in Green-Wood Cemetery.

New York State Assembly
Preceded by District Created	New York State Assembly; Kings County, 16th District; 1893	Succeeded by James Graham (Brooklyn)
