= James Graham (Brooklyn) =

American politician

James Graham (March 24, 1847 – December 11, 1917) was an American hatter and politician from New York.

== Life ==
Graham was born on March 24, 1847, in Chatham Square, Manhattan, the son of James Graham and Margaret Fahey. He moved to Williamsburg, Brooklyn when he was young. He was of Irish parentage.

As a young man, Graham worked as a hatter. He helped organize the Hatters Union of Brooklyn and served as president of the National Association of Hatters. He later retired from hatting to work in politics, but he remained dedicated to trade unionism in Brooklyn. When he was in the Assembly, he worked on legislation that improved conditions for labor union workers. After living in Brooklyn for 40 years, he moved to Canarsie, where he was involved with the Democratic Party under Patrick H. McCarren.

In 1892, Graham was elected to the New York State Assembly as a Democrat, representing the Kings County 18th District. He served in the Assembly in 1893. He won re-election and briefly served in 1894, but he was unseated on February 21 and replaced by his opponent in the election, William H. Friday. After he left the Assembly, he worked as a clerk for the Brooklyn Board of Elections, a position he served until his death.

Graham was married to Margaret Redmund. Their daughters, Mary and Margaret, worked as public school teachers. He was involved in the Roman Catholic Church of the Holy Family, and was an active member of the Catholic Benevolent Legion. He was a member of the Kings County Democratic County Committee for over forty years.

Graham died at home from bronchitis and heart disease on December 11, 1917. He was buried in Holy Cross Cemetery.

New York State Assembly
Preceded by District Created	New York State Assembly; Kings County, 18 District; 1893	Succeeded by Julius L. Wieman
Preceded by Walter L. Durack	New York State Assembly; Kings County, 6th District; January 1894-February 1894	Succeeded by William H. Friday
