= George F. Alexander =

American judge (1882–1948)

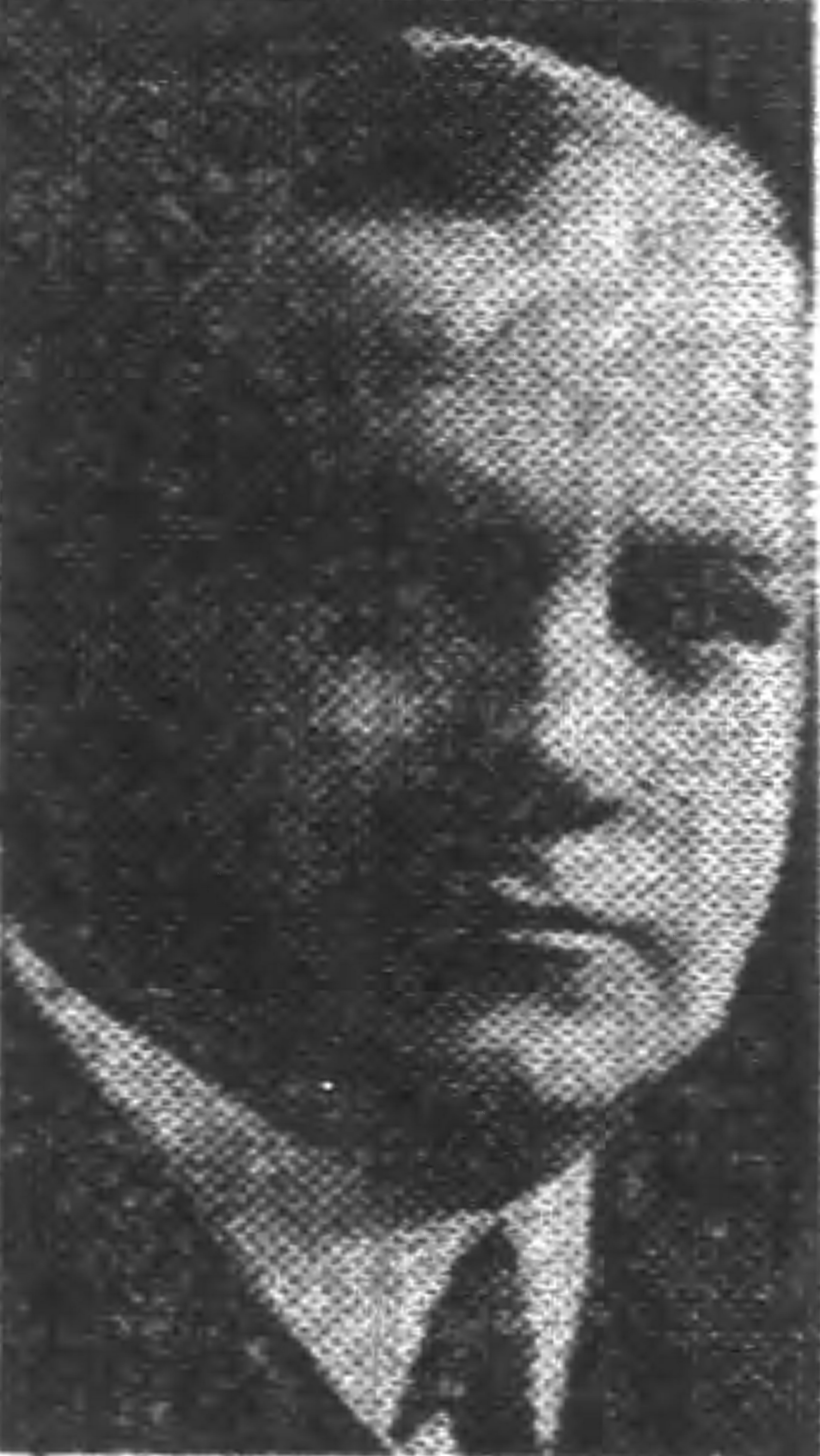

Judge of the United States territorial court for the District of Alaska, First Division
- In office July 18, 1933 – May 5, 1947
- Appointed by: Franklin D. Roosevelt
- Preceded by: Justin W. Harding
- Succeeded by: George W. Folta

Personal details
- Born: George Forest Alexander; April 10, 1882 Gallatin, Missouri, U.S.
- Died: May 16, 1948 (aged 66) Portland, Oregon, U.S.
- Parent: Joshua W. Alexander (father)
- Education: University of Missouri (LLB)

George Forest Alexander (April 10, 1882 – May 16, 1948) was an American judge of the United States territorial court for the Alaska Territory from 1933 to 1947. He was born in Gallatin, Missouri, the son of future secretary of commerce Joshua W. Alexander. He was in private practice in Portland, Oregon, for over 20 years before being appointed to the bench in Alaska. Alexander died in Portland.
