= Moerani Frébault =

French politician (born 1988)

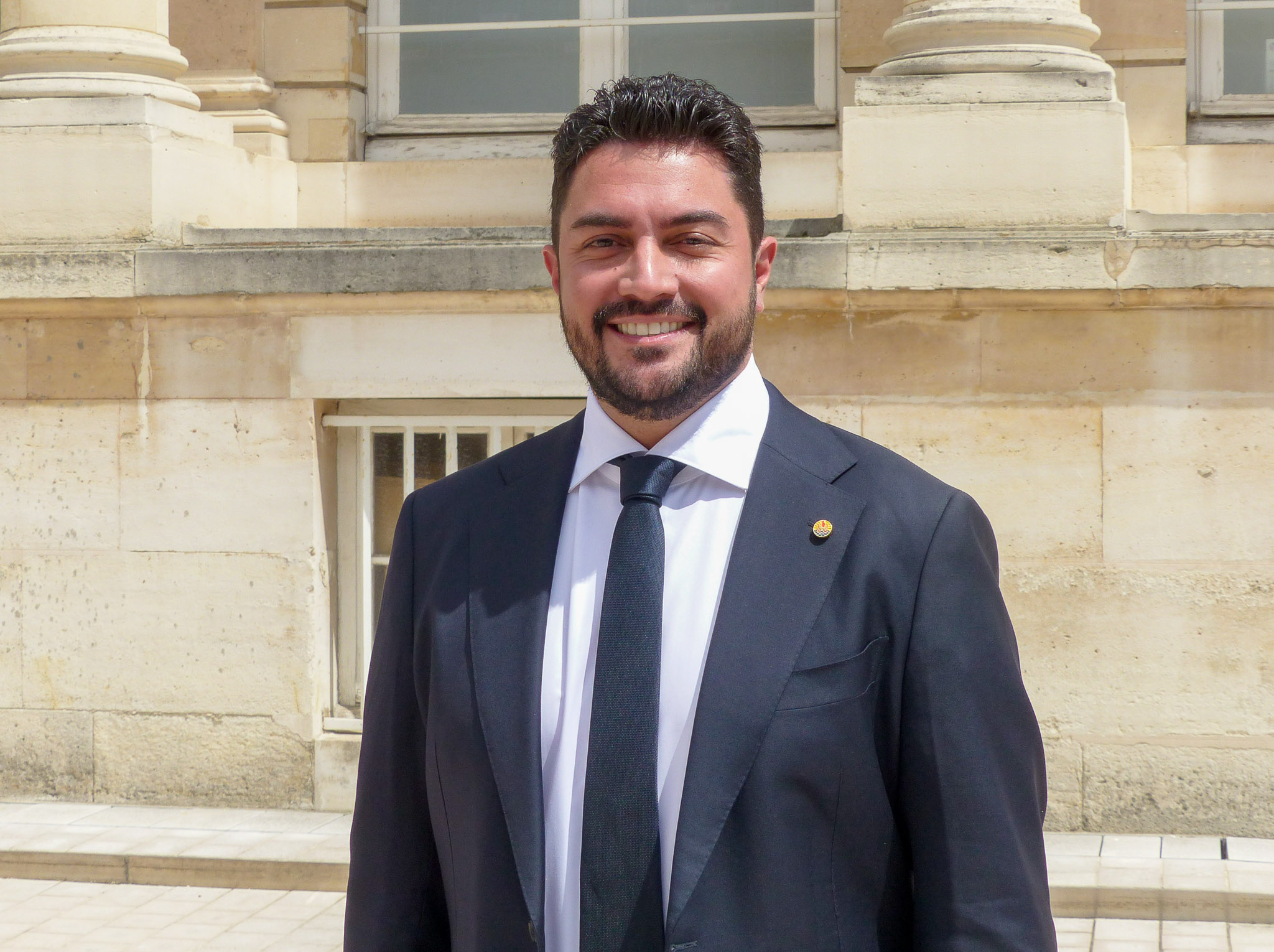
- Frébault in 2024

Member of the French National Assembly for French Polynesia's 1st constituency
- Incumbent
- Assumed office 18 July 2024
- Preceded by: Tematai Le Gayic

Personal details
- Born: 22 August 1988 (age 36)
- Political party: Tāpura Huiraʻatira
- Parent: Joëlle Frébault (mother)

Moerani Frébault (born 22 August 1988) is a French politician of the Tāpura Huiraʻatira party. He was elected member of the National Assembly for French Polynesia's 1st constituency in the 2024 election. In the 2024 European Parliament election, he was a candidate for Besoin d'Europe. He is the son of Joëlle Frébault.
