= George E. Waldo =

American politician

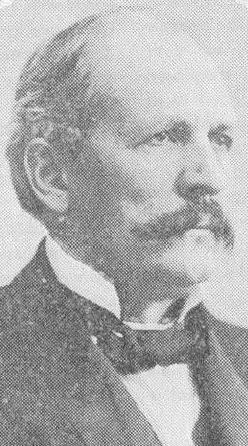

Member of the U.S. House of Representatives from New York's 5th district
- In office March 4, 1905 – March 3, 1909
- Preceded by: Edward Bassett
- Succeeded by: Richard Young

Member of the New York State Assembly from the Kings County, 18th district
- In office January 1, 1896 – December 31, 1896
- Preceded by: Julius L. Wieman
- Succeeded by: George J. Soper

Personal details
- Born: January 11, 1851 Brooklyn, New York City, New York
- Died: June 16, 1942 (aged 91) Pasadena, California
- Party: Republican

George Ernest Waldo (January 11, 1851 – June 16, 1942) was a U.S. representative from New York.

Born in Brooklyn, New York, Waldo attended the public schools of Scotland, Connecticut, and Brooklyn, New York, Doctor Fitch's Academy, South Windham, Connecticut, Natchaug High School, Willimantic, Connecticut, and studied two years in Cornell University, Ithaca, New York, class of 1872. He studied law in New York City.

He was admitted to the bar in Poughkeepsie, New York, in 1876 and practiced in New York City 1876–1883 and in Ulysses, Nebraska from 1883 to 1889. Village attorney of Ulysses, Nebraska, for several years. For four years a member of the board of trustees and school director of Ulysses High School.

He returned to New York City in 1889. He was a member of the New York State Assembly (Kings Co., 18th D.) in 1896. He served as commissioner of records of Kings County, New York from 1899 to 1904. He served as delegate to the Republican National Convention in 1900.

Waldo was elected as a Republican to the Fifty-ninth and Sixtieth Congresses (March 4, 1905 – March 3, 1909). He was not a candidate for renomination in 1908. He resumed the practice of law in New York City. He moved to Los Angeles, California, in 1913, to Pasadena, California, in 1918, and continued the practice of his profession. He died in Pasadena, California on June 16, 1942. He remains were cremated and the ashes deposited in the New Cemetery, Scotland, Connecticut.

== Legacy and honors ==
- The World War II Liberty Ship SS George E. Waldo was named in his honor.

New York State Assembly
Preceded by Julius L. Wieman	New York State Assembly; Kings County, 18th District; 1896	Succeeded by George J. Soper
U.S. House of Representatives
Preceded by Edward Bassett	Member of the U.S. House of Representatives from New York's 5th congressional district 1905–1909	Succeeded by Richard Young
