= SS George E. Waldo =

Liberty ship of WWII

History

United States
- Name: George E. Waldo
- Namesake: George E. Waldo
- Owner: War Shipping Administration (WSA)
- Operator: Shepard Steamship Corp.
- Ordered: as type (EC2-S-C1) hull, MC hull 2501
- Awarded: 23 April 1943
- Builder: St. Johns River Shipbuilding Company, Jacksonville, Florida
- Cost: $982,429
- Yard number: 65
- Way number: 5
- Laid down: 18 September 1944
- Launched: 23 October 1944
- Sponsored by: Mrs. Ruby M. Waggener
- Completed: 31 October 1944
- Identification: Call sign: KTFM
- Fate: Sold for commercial use, 4 September 1946

United States
- Name: George E. Waldo (1947); Hawaiian Forester (1947-1955)
- Owner: Matson Navigation Co
- Fate: Sold, 1955

United States
- Name: C.R. Musser
- Owner: Weyerhaeuser Steamship Company
- Fate: Sold, 1969

Panama
- Name: Reliance Serenity
- Owner: Reliance Carriers SA
- Operator: Hong Kong Maritime Co.
- Fate: Sold, 1970

Philippines
- Name: LSCO Bulktrain
- Owner: Luzon Stevedoring Corp.
- Fate: Scrapped, 1974

General characteristics
- Class & type: Liberty ship; type EC2-S-C1, standard
- Tonnage: 10,865 LT DWT; 7,176 GRT
- Displacement: 3,380 long tons (3,434 t) (light); 14,245 long tons (14,474 t) (max)
- Length: 441 feet 6 inches (135 m) oa; 416 feet (127 m) pp; 427 feet (130 m) lwl
- Beam: 57 feet (17 m)
- Draft: 27 ft 9.25 in (8.4646 m)
- Installed power: 2 × Oil fired 450 °F (232 °C) boilers, operating at 220 psi (1,500 kPa); 2,500 hp (1,900 kW)
- Propulsion: 1 × triple-expansion steam engine, (manufactured by General Machinery Corp., Hamilton, Ohio); 1 × screw propeller
- Speed: 11.5 knots (21.3 km/h; 13.2 mph)
- Capacity: 562,608 cubic feet (15,931 m^{3}) (grain); 499,573 cubic feet (14,146 m^{3}) (bale)
- Complement: 38–62 USMM; 21–40 USNAG
- Armament: Varied by ship; Bow-mounted 3-inch (76 mm)/50-caliber gun; Stern-mounted 4-inch (102 mm)/50-caliber gun; 2–8 × single 20-millimeter (0.79 in) Oerlikon anti-aircraft (AA) cannons and/or, 2–8 × 37-millimeter (1.46 in) M1 AA guns

SS George E. Waldo was a Liberty ship built in the United States during World War II. She was named after George E. Waldo, a US Representative from New York.

== Construction ==
George E. Waldo was laid down on 18 September 1944, under a Maritime Commission (MARCOM) contract, MC hull 2501, by the St. Johns River Shipbuilding Company, Jacksonville, Florida; she was sponsored by Mrs. Ruby M. Waggener, the mother of the southern states winner of a newspaper contest for news boys selling war bonds and stamps, and was launched on 23 October 1944.

== History ==
She was allocated to the Shepard Steamship Corp., on 31 October 1944 for use during World War II. She was sold for commercial use, 4 September 1946, to Matson Navigation Co., for $577,464.50 and renamed the SS Hawaiian Forester In 1955 she was sold to the Weyerhaeuser Steamship Company and renamed the SS C. R. Musser. In 1969 she was sold to Reliance Carriers SA and renamed the SS Reliance Serenity. In 1970 she was sold to Luzon Stevedoring Corp. of Manila - Philippines and renamed the SS Lsco Bulktrain. In 1974 she was scrapped in Taiwan.

== Bibliography ==
- "St. John's River Shipbuilding, Jacksonville FL". www.ShipbuildingHistory.com. 16 October 2010.
- Maritime Administration. "George E. Waldo". Ship History Database Vessel Status Card. U.S. Department of Transportation, Maritime Administration.
- Davies, James (May 2004). "Specifications (As-Built)" (PDF). p. 23.
- "SS George E. Waldo".
