= Preston Bassett =

American inventor and engineer of aviation instruments (1892–1992)

- Born: Preston Rogers Bassett; March 20, 1892; Buffalo, New York, U.S.
- Died: April 30, 1992 (aged 100); Ridgefield, Connecticut, U.S.
- Education: Amherst College (BA, 1913); Brooklyn Polytechnic Institute
- Known for: High-intensity searchlights, Gyrocompass improvements, Flight instrumentation, Aircraft soundproofing
- Title: President, Sperry Gyroscope Company (1945–1955)
- Spouse: Gertrude Bassett
- Awards: Daniel Guggenheim Medal (1958)
- Scientific career
- Fields: Aerospace engineering, Applied physics
- Workplaces: Sperry Gyroscope Company

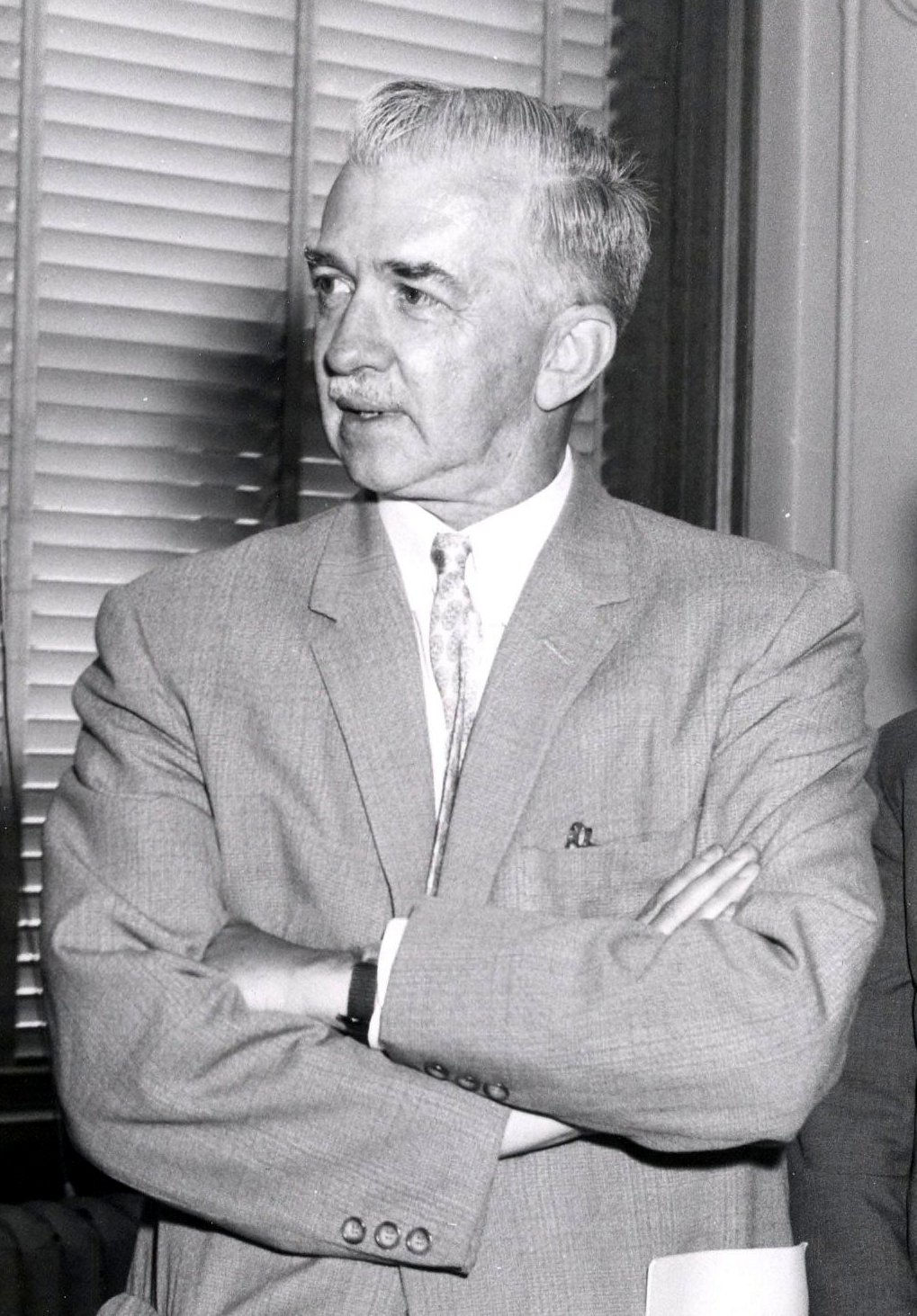
Preston R. Bassett, from a photo that depicted the final meeting of the National Advisory Committee for Aeronautics (NACA) on August 21, 1958. T. Keith Glennan (to the left of Bassett in the original) was sworn in as the first Administrator of NASA, and was seen here speaking to Preston R. Bassett (center—cropped to show him only), member of the NACA Committee on Aerodynamics, and Charles J. McCarthy (who was on Bassett's right), Chairman of the Board of Chance Vought Aircraft, Inc. Original photo can be seen at https://www.flickr.com/photos/nasa_appel/4525536545/

Preston Rogers Bassett (March 20, 1892 – April 30, 1992) was an inventor, engineer, and pioneer in instruments for aviation.

== Biography ==
Preston Rogers Bassett was born in Buffalo, New York, son of urban planner Edward Murray Bassett and Annie Preston Bassett. Geologist Isabel Bassett Wasson was his sister. He received an A.B. from Amherst College in 1913 and attended the Polytechnic Institute of Brooklyn in 1913-1914. He received two honorary degrees, an M.A. and a D.Sc., from Amherst College, and an honorary LLD from Adelphi College. He married Jeanne Reed Mordorf in 1919 and had four children. Jeanne Reed Mordorf was born November 1, 1893, in Trenton, NJ, graduated from Vassar College in 1915. They were married in Brooklyn May 24, 1919. Their home from 1925 to 1952 was 104 Broadway, Rockville Centre, NY.

== Career at Sperry ==
Bassett worked for the Sperry Gyroscope Company for his whole career, where he rose from research engineer (1914) to Chief Engineer (1929), Vice-President in Charge of Engineering (1932), General Manager (1944), and President (1945-1956). He was also Vice President of the merged Sperry Corporation (1950-1957). He held 35 patents awarded between 1920 and 1937, including several for improved high-intensity carbon arc lights used in anti-aircraft searchlights and movie projectors. He helped Albert A. Michelson use arc light and gyroscope technology to measure the speed of light at Mount Wilson in June, 1924. He also developed the first soundproofing systems for airplanes and worked closely with Sperry founder Elmer Ambrose Sperry on several flight instruments based on gyroscopes, especially the gyrocompass, crucial to flying safely at night and in bad weather. The first blind landing (now called an instrument landing) was made by aviation pioneer Jimmy Doolittle in 1929 using Sperry instruments.

== Later life and work ==
Bassett's many interests in addition to aviation included antique collecting, early technology, and history of Long Island and New England. He was President of the Institute of Aeronautical Sciences (1947), Nassau Historical Society (1947-1954), Friends of Old Bethpage Village (1966-1970), and Keeler Tavern Preservation Society in Ridgefield, Connecticut (1968-1972). He served as Vice President of the Society for the Preservation of Long Island Antiquities (1962-1972) and New York State Historical Association in Cooperstown, New York (1964-1975). He served as Chairman of the Board of Trustees of the Polytechnic Institute of Brooklyn (1952-1961). He was a director of Abilities, Inc., a company that employed the handicapped. He was a fellow of the American Physical Society, American Association for the Advancement of Science, American Institute of Aeronautics and Astronautics, and Institute of Aeronautical Sciences. He was a member of the National Advisory Committee for Aeronautics (NACA) from 1954 to 1958, when it became the present National Aeronautics and Space Administration (NASA). He was a keen observer of atmospheric phenomena encouraging others to look skyward to see the optical effects of clouds, raindrops, and ice crystals. He painted still lives and landscapes. He wrote books and articles on topics ranging from Long Island Craftsmen to Shadow Bands and Searchlights. His lectures to local groups on these topics were very popular. In his eighties and nineties he embarked on an "uncollecting" program in which he gave antiques to the Smithsonian Institution, Henry Ford Museum, Mead Art Museum, Old Bethpage Village, Farmers' Museum, Keeler Tavern, and others, always encouraging the museums to put his antiques into historical context. He died on April 30, 1992, at the age of 100.
