= Isabel Bassett Wasson =

American petroleum geologist

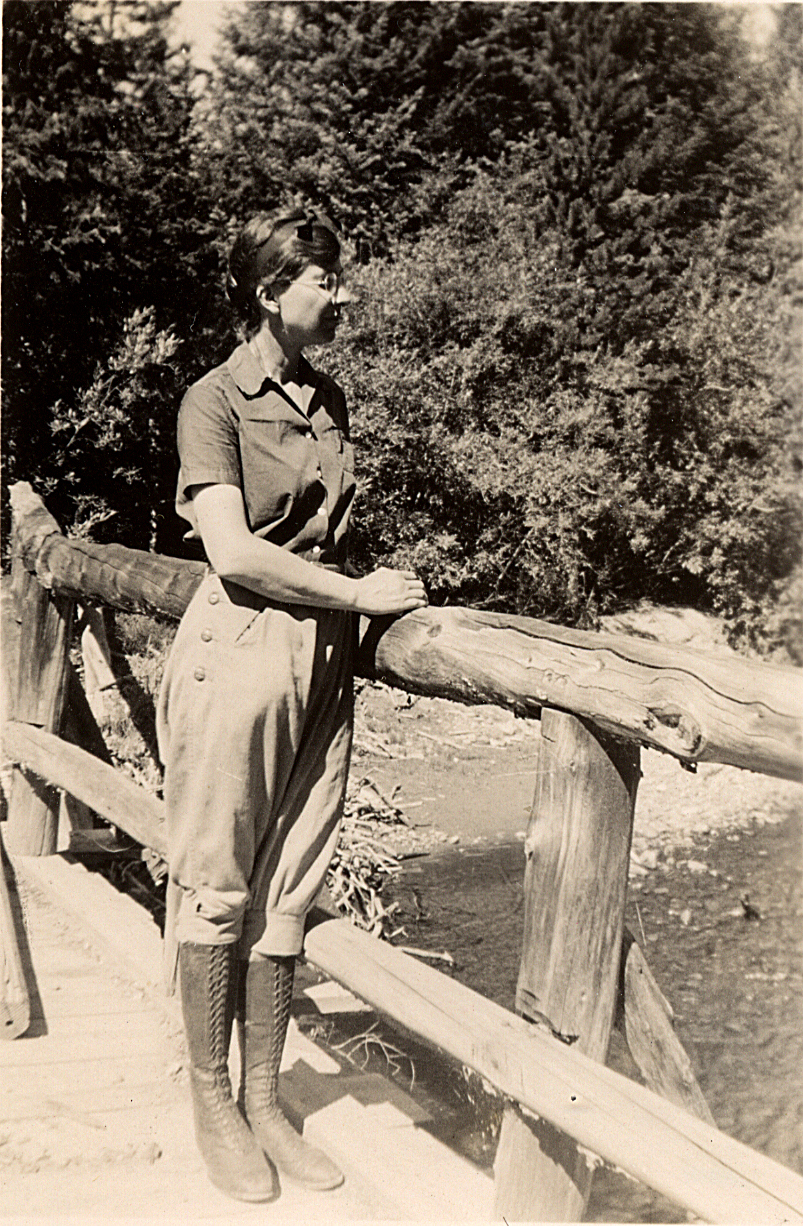
- Wasson on a bridge, circa 1920
- Born: January 11, 1897; Brooklyn, New York
- Died: February 21, 1994 (aged 97); La Grange Park, Illinois
- Citizenship: United States
- Known for: Pioneering woman scientist, first female park ranger at Yellowstone, one of the first female petroleum geologists.
- Scientific career
- Fields: Earth science, geology, ornithology

Isabel Bassett Wasson (January 11, 1897 – February 21, 1994) was one of the first female petroleum geologists in the United States, the first female ranger at Yellowstone National Park, and also one of the first interpretive rangers (male or female) hired by the National Park Service.

== Early life and education ==
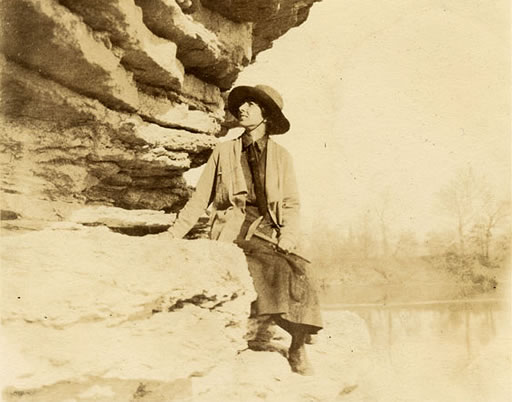
Wasson at an outcrop, circa 1920

Wasson was born Isabel Deming Bassett in Brooklyn, New York on January 11, 1897, daughter of urban planner Edward Bassett and Annie Preston Bassett, and sister of inventor and engineer Preston Bassett. As a child she visited quarries throughout New England with her father, collecting rocks and fossils, spurring her interest in geology. Wasson graduated Phi Beta Kappa from Wellesley College in 1918, majoring in history so she could take a wide range of science courses. She took classes in geology after graduation at the University of Chicago and the Massachusetts Institute of Technology. Wasson got a master's degree in geology at Columbia University in 1934.

== Career ==
=== Yellowstone and National Park Service ===
Wasson became one of the first interpretive rangers hired by the National Park Service, and the second ranger and first female ranger at Yellowstone National Park. She was hired when Horace Albright, then the Park Superintendent, heard her lecture on geology to a group of her family and friends who were visiting the park in the summer of 1919 on a tour of national parks organized by the Brooklyn Daily Eagle. Albright invited her to return in the summer of 1920 to lead interpretive tours and give lectures about the geology of the park, which she did. After she was hired she wrote to the Wellesley alumnae magazine, "Next summer I am to be a ranger in Yellowstone Park. You never heard of a woman ranger? Well, neither have I." She gave over 200 public talks on the geology of the park that summer, and is credited with setting the template for interpretive talks by NPS rangers. Albright also asked her to train the hotel bellhops to give talks similar to hers, but she concluded that they lacked the background in geology to do this. She suggested instead that the park hire geology and biology students as summer interns to lead the tours during the tourist season, and this became a tradition at Yellowstone and many other parks. In fact, the training program Wasson developed became the template for training NPS summer interns for decades. Albright invited her to return again in the summer of 1921, but she declined because she was pregnant. She inquired about returning in 1922 but others had been hired to do similar work.

=== Petroleum Geology ===
Wasson worked as a petroleum geologist in her husband's office at the Pure Oil Company from the early 1920s until 1928, becoming one of the first women petroleum engineers. In the early 1920s, Pure Oil Company sent Isabel Bassett Wasson to Venezuela to study oil fields that had been recently discovered. It was quite unusual for a woman to do that work in the 1920s, and she made headlines in newspapers across the country. She and her husband also traveled to Puerto Rico for their work. She published two scholarly articles on geology, one co-authored with her husband about an oil field discovered by Pure Oil in 1914, and another by herself about the ages of rock formations in Ohio and new terminology for them; the latter was cited in a number of other papers and a recent book.

=== Later career and local contributions ===
After 1928 she spent over 50 years in River Forest, IL, teaching science in the local public schools, lecturing, bird watching(ornithology), and mentoring generations of young naturalists. She was honored in 1982 when the Wasson Room at a local school was named after her to hold local history resources. Her love of history and interest in Native American culture led her to become an amateur archaeologist, and she led digs of several early European historical sites near her home in IL. She mapped locations of Native American settlements and trade trails and discovered a Native American religious mound in Thatcher Woods in the 1930s. An article about her discovery called her "the one who started the environmental education movement in America back in the 1920s and '30s." From 1953 to 1954, Wasson served as President of the Chicago Ornithological Society. Wasson also taught classes at the Morton Arboretum in Lisle, Illinois. She was quoted in this 1986 Chicago Tribune article as an expert on local geology at age 89.

== Personal life ==
She met her future husband, petroleum geologist Theron Wasson, whom she married on June 11, 1920, while working towards a master's degree. They had three children: Elizabeth W. Bergstrom, a biologist; Edward B. Wasson, a petroleum geologist; and Anne Harney Gallagher, an art historian. Theron and Isabel divorced in 1953 and she did not remarry. Isabel Bassett Wasson died at the age of 97 on February 21, 1994, in La Grange Park, Illinois. She is buried in Plain Cemetery in Ashfield, Massachusetts.
