= Edward Bassett =

American lawyer, politician, and urban planner (1863–1948)

Edward Murray Bassett
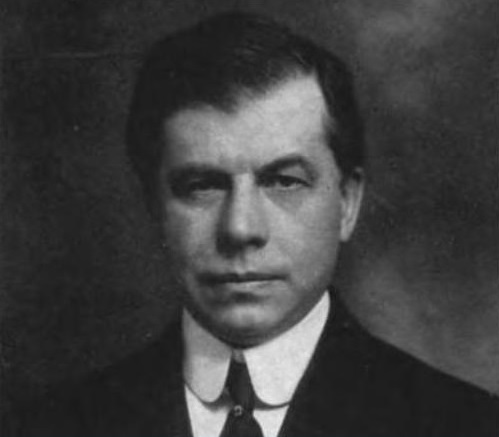
- Bassett, circa 1914

Member of the U.S. House of Representatives from New York's 5th district
- In office March 4, 1903 – March 3, 1905
- Preceded by: Frank E. Wilson
- Succeeded by: George E. Waldo

Personal details
- Born: February 7, 1863 Brooklyn, New York, US
- Died: October 27, 1948 (aged 85) Brooklyn, New York, US
- Party: Democratic
- Spouse: Annie Rebecca Preston Bassett
- Children: Marion Preston Bassett; Preston Rogers Bassett; Isabel Bassett Wasson; Howard Murray Bassett; Helen Bassett Hauser
- Education: Amherst College; Columbia University Law School
- Profession: lawyer; politician

Edward Murray Bassett (February 7, 1863 – October 27, 1948), "the father of American zoning", and one of the founding fathers of modern-day urban planning, wrote the first comprehensive zoning ordinance in the United States, which was adopted by New York City in 1916. He also served one term as a U.S. representative for New York from 1903 to 1905.

== Biography ==
Bassett was born on February 7, 1863, in Brooklyn, New York, son of merchant Charles R. Bassett and Elvira Rogers Bassett. He attended Hamilton College and Amherst College, graduating from the latter in 1884. While at Amherst he was elected to Phi Beta Kappa and joined the Delta Upsilon fraternity. From 1884 to 1886 he attended Columbia University Law School, and taught at a private school run by R. D. Dodge in Brooklyn. In 1886 Bassett graduated from Columbia and was admitted to the bar, and began practicing law in Buffalo, New York. He married Annie R. Preston on May 14, 1890, and they had five children together: Marion P. Bassett; inventor and engineer Preston Bassett; geologist Isabel Bassett Wasson; Howard M. Bassett; and Helen B. Hauser.

== Career ==
After returning to New York City in 1892 to practice law, Bassett served on the Brooklyn School Board from 1899 to 1901 and chaired the Local School Board from 1901 to 1903.

In 1903 Bassett was elected as a Democrat to the United States House of Representatives, representing New York's 5th congressional district. He served one term from March 4, 1903, to March 3, 1905, but declined to run for reelection so he could serve at the local level. Major projects he worked on included bankruptcy law, the Panama Canal, advocating a canal route through Nicaragua, and opposing high tariffs.

In 1907 Bassett was appointed by Governor Charles Evans Hughes to the New York Public Service Commission, where he served until 1911. During this time he aided in the development of the Dual Contracts (also called the dual subway plan) for the New York City Subway, which resulted in subways connecting Manhattan and Brooklyn for the first time, and he also championed the streamlining of train movement by abolishing stub-end terminals in favor of the "pendulum" method of train movement. He was vice-chairman of the Brooklyn Committee on City Plan, for which a report was published in 1914. He was chairman of the Heights of Buildings Commission in New York City, the final report of which 1916 presented the first Zoning Resolution of the City of New York, which was the first comprehensive zoning ordinance in the United States. He consequently served posts of counsel to the Zoning Committee of New York, the Regional Plan of New York and Its Environs, and the New York City Planning Commission. A member of the Advisory Committee on City Planning and Zoning, Bassett was appointed by then U.S. Commerce Department Secretary Herbert Hoover to serve as president of the National Conference on City Planning. Two articles written to commemorate the centennial of the first New York zoning ordinance in 1916 highlighted his role in its creation." Carl Weisbrod, the current chairman of the City Planning Commission,] credited Mr. McAneny and Mr. Bassett with creating a revolutionary document couched in accepted common-law and constitutional doctrines: that landowners are not entirely free to create nuisances to those around them; and that local governments may police conduct in the name of public health, safety and welfare." "Bassett (1863- 1948) served as chairman for both zoning commissions and has been called the “father” and “midwife” of American zoning for the prominent role he played in establishing New York's code and helping to institute the system around the country."

Most of Bassett's work, both private and on committees, concerned city planning, zoning and the legal issues surrounding these fields. Bassett is credited with developing the "freeway" and "parkway" concepts, and for coining the term "freeway" to describe a controlled-access urban highway, based on the parkway concept but open to commercial traffic.

Bassett authored the 1936 book Zoning, published by the Russell Sage Foundation.

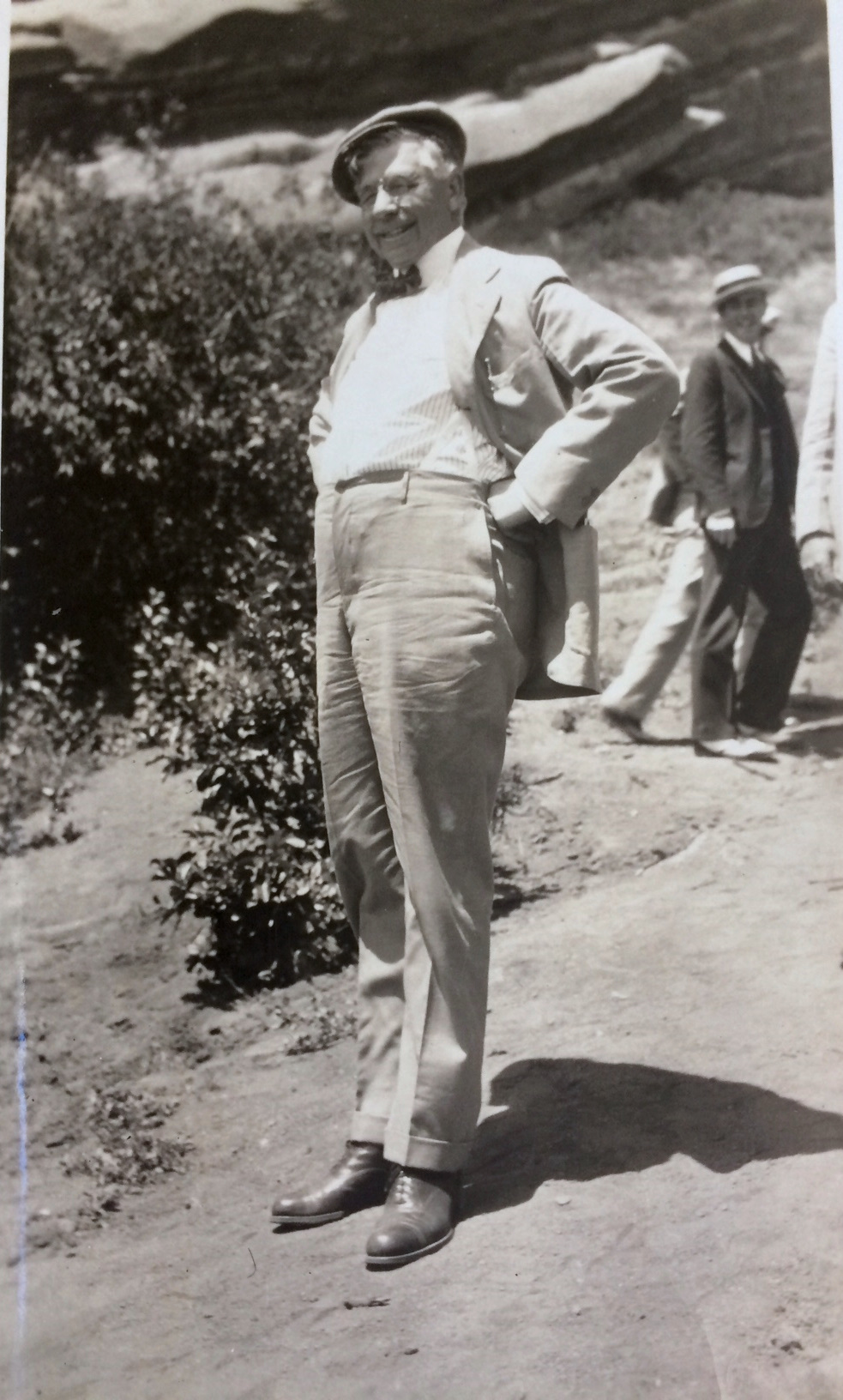
Edward Murray Bassett standing & smiling, 1930

== Death ==
Bassett died in Brooklyn, Kings County, New York, on October 27, 1948, at the age of 85. He is buried at Ashfield Plains Cemetery, Ashfield, Massachusetts.

Preceded by Frank E. Wilson	Member of the U.S. House of Representatives from New York's 5th congressional district March 4, 1903 to March 3, 1905	Succeeded by George E. Waldo
