= William C. Redfield =

American politician (1858–1932)

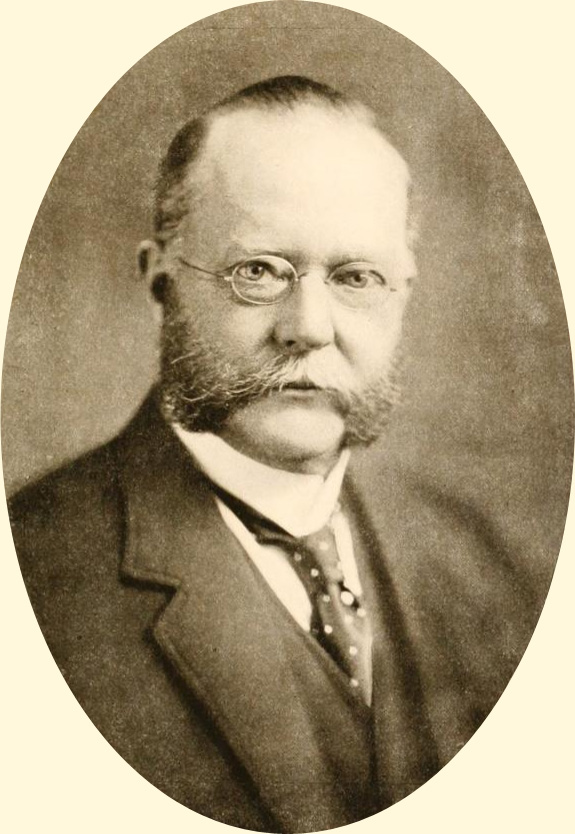

1st United States Secretary of Commerce
- In office March 5, 1913 – October 31, 1919
- President: Woodrow Wilson
- Preceded by: Position established Charles Nagel as Secretary of Commerce and Labor
- Succeeded by: Joshua W. Alexander

Member of the U.S. House of Representatives from New York's 5th district
- In office March 4, 1911 – March 3, 1913
- Preceded by: Richard Young
- Succeeded by: James P. Maher

Personal details
- Born: William Cox Redfield; June 18, 1858 Albany, New York, U.S.
- Died: June 13, 1932 (aged 73) New York City, U.S.
- Resting place: Albany Rural Cemetery
- Party: Democratic
- Other political affiliations: National Democratic (1896–1900)
- Spouse: Elise Mercein Fuller (m. 1885)
- Children: 2

William Cox Redfield (June 18, 1858 – June 13, 1932) was a Democratic politician from New York who served both in the U.S. Congress and as the first U.S. Secretary of Commerce.

== Early life ==
William Cox Redfield was born on June 18, 1858, in Albany, New York. In 1867, the family moved to Pittsfield, Massachusetts. He attended public schools in Pittsfield and at home schooling.

== Career ==
Redfield worked at a post office in Pittsfield and then became a traveling salesman for a paper company. At the age of 19, he moved to New York City and worked at a stationery and printing business. In 1883, he became bookkeeper and shipping clerk for J. H. Williams & Co. of Brooklyn, a steel and iron products manufacturer. He would later become president of the company. He also became interested in other manufacturing and banking and insurance companies. In 1907, he established Sirocco Engineering Company, which later merged with the American Blower Company of Detroit. He served as vice president of the American Blower Company until 1913.

In 1896, Redfield was a delegate to the Gold Democrats National Convention in Indianapolis, Indiana. He was an unsuccessful candidate for the U.S. Congress as a Gold Democrat in 1896. From 1902 to 1903, he served as commissioner of public works for the Brooklyn borough. He then represented the New York's 5th congressional district in the U.S. House of Representatives from March 4, 1911, to March 3, 1913, as a Democrat. In Congress, he advocated for lower tariff rates. He was an unsuccessful Democratic candidate for Vice President of the United States and then declined renomination to Congress in 1912. He was a supporter of labor rights.

President Woodrow Wilson appointed Redfield as U.S. Secretary of Commerce and he served from March 4, 1913, until his resignation on November 1, 1919. Under his tenure, he helped reorganize and expand the Bureau of Foreign and Domestic Commerce. During World War I, he helped develop the War Trade Board, the Bureau of Standards, and the Council of National Defense. He advocated for a big navy to protect American business interests abroad.

Redfield was president of the American Manufacturers Export Association, the National Society for the Promotion of Industrial Education, the American-Russian Chamber of Commerce, the Netherlands Chamber of Commerce in New York, and the National Institute of Social Sciences. In 1927, he was president of the Danish-American Corporation. In 1929, he was the first president of the newly established Brooklyn National Bank. In the 1930s, he spoke against the "super-patriotism" of high tariffs. On high tariffs, he said in November 1930: "We cannot play a lone hand. We are not big enough, strong enough or rich enough to do it. In declaring ourselves independent, we are entering upon a dangerous game which the other man can play with loaded dice."

Later in life, Redfield became engaged with banking, investing, and insurance business in New York City and Brooklyn.

== Personal life ==
Redfield married Elise Mercein Fuller of Brooklyn in 1885. They had a son and daughter, Humphrey and Mrs. Charles K. Drury.

Redfield died on June 13, 1932, at his home at Monroe Place in New York City. He was buried in Albany Rural Cemetery.

== Publications ==
- Redfield, William Cox (1912). The new industrial day, a book for men who employ men. New York: The Century Co. LCCN 12025163. (Includes Redfield's views on labor)
- Redfield, William (April 1912). "The Progress of Japanese Industry". The Journal of Race Development. 2 (4): 362–372. doi:10.2307/29737925. JSTOR 29737925.
- Redfield, William Cox (1924). With Congress and cabinet. Garden City, N.Y.: Doubleday, Page & company. hdl:2027/uc1.b4506941. LCCN 24006006.
- Redfield, William Cox (1924–1925). Glimpses of Our Government
- Redfield, William Cox (1926). Dependent America
- Redfield, William Cox (1927). We and the world. New York: Newark [etc.] LCCN 27024211.

U.S. House of Representatives
Preceded by Richard Young	Member of the U.S. House of Representatives from New York's 5th congressional district 1911–1913	Succeeded by James P. Maher
Political offices
Preceded by new office	U.S. Secretary of Commerce; Served under: Woodrow Wilson; 1913–1919	Succeeded by Joshua W. Alexander
