= Richard Young (New York politician) =

American politician

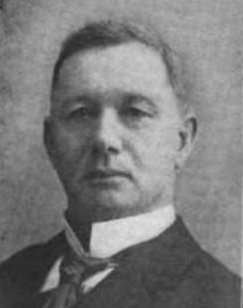

Member of the U.S. House of Representatives from New York's 5th district
- In office March 4, 1909 – March 3, 1911
- Preceded by: George E. Waldo
- Succeeded by: William C. Redfield

Personal details
- Born: August 6, 1846 Derry, Ireland, U.K.
- Died: June 9, 1935 (aged 88) Brooklyn, New York, U.S.
- Resting place: Green-Wood Cemetery
- Party: Republican
- Education: Crittenden's Commercial College

Richard Young (August 6, 1846 – June 9, 1935) was a U.S. representative from New York.

Born in Derry, Ireland, Young migrated to the United States in 1851 with his parents, who settled in Philadelphia, Pennsylvania. He attended the public schools and graduated from Crittenden's Commercial College in Philadelphia. He moved to Flatbush, New York (which was incorporated into Brooklyn City in 1894), in 1866 and engaged in an extensive leather trade in New York City. He served as a member of the board of school commissioners of Brooklyn from 1895 to 1902, and as park commissioner for the boroughs of Brooklyn and Queens in 1902 and 1903. He also engaged in banking and business enterprises.

Young was elected as a Republican to the Sixty-first Congress (March 4, 1909 – March 3, 1911). He declined to be a candidate for re-election in 1910.

Subsequently, he resumed his interest in the leather industry and continued in banking and in other business enterprises in Brooklyn. He resided in Flatbush in Brooklyn, New York, until his death on June 9, 1935. He was interred in Green-Wood Cemetery.

U.S. House of Representatives
Preceded by George E. Waldo	Member of the U.S. House of Representatives from New York's 5th congressional district 1909–1911	Succeeded by William C. Redfield
