= Joëlle Frébault =

Politician in French Polynesia

Member of the French Polynesian Assembly for Marquesas Islands
- Incumbent
- Assumed office 17 May 2018

Personal details
- Party: Tapura Huiraatira
- Children: Moerani Frébault

Joëlle Frébault is a French Polynesian politician. She is a Member of the Assembly of French Polynesia and the first woman elected mayor of the Marquesas Islands.

== Biography ==
Frébault was the elected representative of the Marquesas Islands to the French Polynesia Assembly. In March 2020 she was elected mayor of the Marquesas Islands, becoming the first woman to hold the position.

In January 2022 she was awarded the Ordre national du Mérite.

She was re-elected to the Assembly in the 2023 election.

She is the mother of Moerani Frébault, who was elected member of the National Assembly in the 2024 election.
