= Maina Sage =

French Polynesian politician

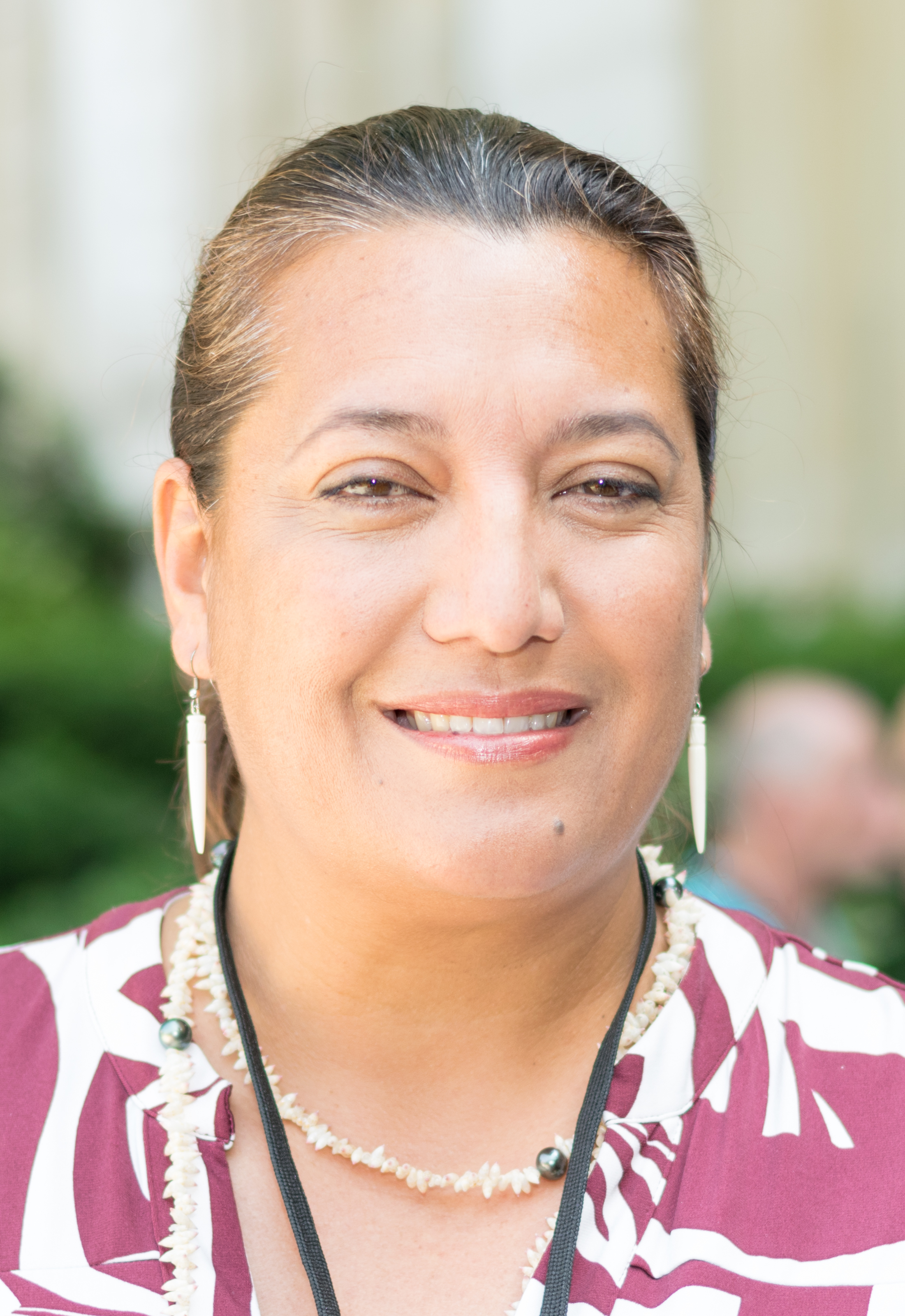
- Sage in 2017

Member of the French National Assembly for French Polynesia's 1st constituency
- In office 30 June 2014 – 18 June 2022
- Preceded by: Édouard Fritch
- Succeeded by: Tematai Le Gayic

Member of the French Polynesian Assembly for Windward Islands 3
- In office 2008–2017

Personal details
- Born: 10 May 1975 (age 50) Papeete, French Polynesia
- Party: Tapura Huiraatira
- Other political affiliations: Tahoera'a Huiraatira
- Occupation: Communication consultant

Maina Sage is a French Polynesian politician and former Cabinet Minister. She was a member of the Assembly of French Polynesia from 2008 to 2017, and a member of the National Assembly for the 1st constituency of French Polynesia from 2014 to 2022. She is a member of Tapura Huiraatira.

== Biography ==
=== Early political career ===
On 29 December 2006 she joined the Government of French Polynesia of Gaston Tong Sang as Minister of Tourism and Environment, a position she held until September 2007. In 2008, she was elected to be a representative to the Assembly of French Polynesia as a member of Tahoera'a Huiraatira. Reelected in May 2013, she became chairwoman of the Committee on the Economy, Finance, Budget and Public Service. As a representative, Sage sat with the Rassemblement pour une majorité autonome (RMA) group. On 11 May 2015, she became Vice-President of the Committee on Institutions, International and European Affairs and Relations with Municipalities.

=== Member of the National Assembly ===
Candidate for the 2014 by-election in the 1st constituency of French Polynesia, convened to replace Édouard Fritch, President of the Assembly of French Polynesia, she won the absolute majority of votes in the first round on 14 June 2014. However, the low participation did not allow for a validation of the election and imposed the organisation of a second round on 28 June, during which she was elected with 58% of the vote.

At its foundation in February 2016, she joined the autonomous political party Tapura Huiraatira, founded by Édouard Fritch, who had since become President of French Polynesia. Sage was reelected to Parliament in the 2017 legislative election.

During a 15th legislature of the French Fifth Republic, she sits on the Constitutional Acts, Legislation and General Administration Committee. She is a member of European Affairs Committee, and member of Delegation to overseas. She is President of the International Study Group on the Pacific Islands and President of the mission of information on the management of the major climatic events in the littoral zones of France and Overseas. She is Vice-President of the France–India Friendship Group and the France–Brazil Friendship Group.

On 12 March 2020, Sage tested positive for COVID-19. She was the first case during the COVID-19 pandemic in French Polynesia.

She intends to stand down at the 2022 parliamentary election.
