= Tematai Le Gayic =

French Polynesian politician

Member of the French Polynesian Assembly for Windward Isles 1
- Incumbent
- Assumed office 30 April 2023

Member of the French National Assembly for French Polynesia's 1st constituency
- In office 22 June 2022 – 9 June 2024
- Preceded by: Maina Sage
- Succeeded by: Moerani Frebault

Personal details
- Born: 11 October 2000 (age 25) Papeete, French Polynesia
- Party: Tavini Huiraatira; New Ecologic and Social People's Union

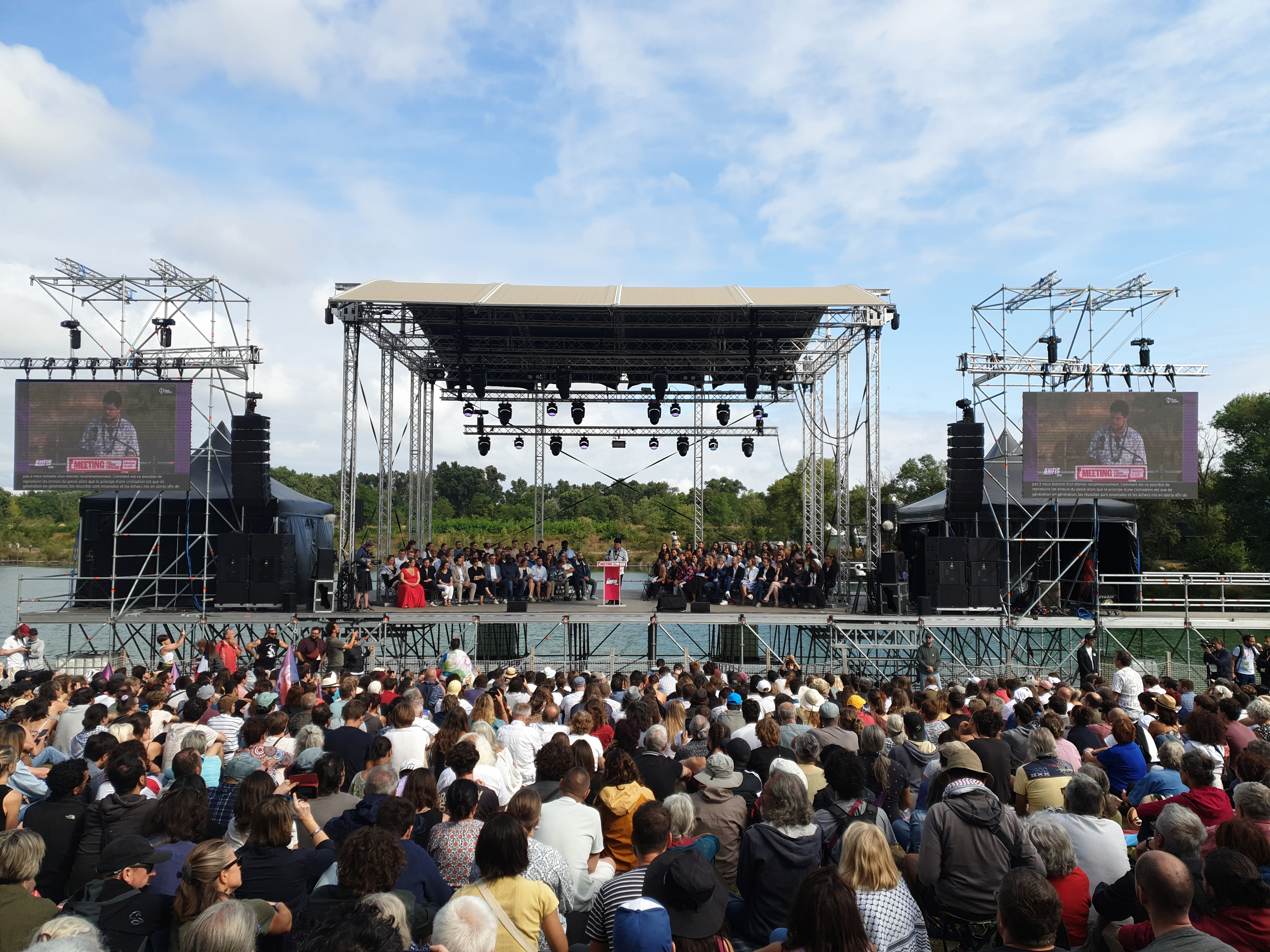
Le Gayic giving a speech in 2024

Tematai Le Gayic (born 11 October 2000) is a French Polynesian politician and former member of the French National Assembly. Upon his election in 2022, he became the youngest deputy in the history of the French Fifth Republic. He is a member of Tavini Huiraatira, and sits with the New Ecologic and Social People's Union in the National Assembly.

Le Gayic was born in Papeetee and grew up in Tubuai in the Austral Islands. He returned to Tahiti when he was 10 and was educated in Papara, before studying history and political science at Paris 8 University Vincennes-Saint-Denis. After graduating in 2021, he began a master's degree in political science at the School for Advanced Studies in the Social Sciences.

He was elected to the French National Assembly in the 2022 French legislative election, defeating Tapura Huiraatira's Nicole Bouteau.

He was elected to the Assembly of French Polynesia in the 2023 French Polynesian legislative election.

Le Gayic was not reelected in the snap 2024 election, losing to Tapura candidate Moerani Frébault.
