= Joshua W. Alexander =

American politician (1852–1936)

Joshua Alexander
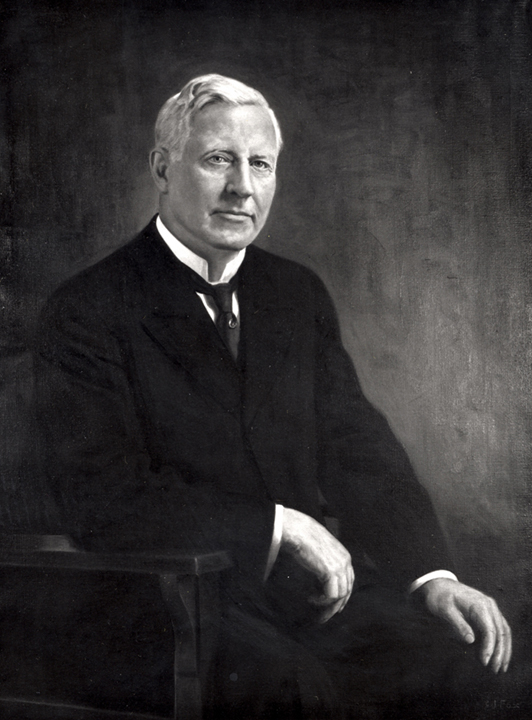

2nd United States Secretary of Commerce
- In office December 16, 1919 – March 4, 1921
- President: Woodrow Wilson
- Preceded by: William C. Redfield
- Succeeded by: Herbert Hoover

Member of the U.S. House of Representatives from Missouri's 3rd district
- In office March 4, 1907 – December 15, 1919
- Preceded by: Frank B. Klepper
- Succeeded by: Jacob L. Milligan

Personal details
- Born: Joshua Willis Alexander; January 22, 1852 Cincinnati, Ohio, U.S.
- Died: February 27, 1936 (aged 84) Gallatin, Missouri, U.S.
- Party: Democratic
- Spouse: Roe Richardson (m. 1876)
- Children: 8, including George
- Education: Culver-Stockton College (BA)

Joshua Willis Alexander (January 22, 1852 – February 27, 1936) was United States secretary of commerce from December 16, 1919, to March 4, 1921, in the administration of President Woodrow Wilson.

== Biography ==
Born on January 22, 1852, in Cincinnati, Ohio, the son of Thomas Willis Alexander and Jane (née Robinson). Alexander attended Culver-Stockton College in Canton, Missouri, and later moved to Gallatin, Missouri, where he served as mayor and then as a state representative in the Missouri General Assembly (1883–1887). He served as a judge on Missouri's 17th Circuit until 1905.

Alexander, a member of the United States Democratic Party, served as a United States representative from Missouri from 1907 until his resignation to become Commerce Secretary in 1919. He served as chairman of the House Committee on Merchant Marine and Fisheries and took a lead role in shaping wartime shipping legislation, which drew him to the attention of President Wilson. He also gained prominence for his service as Chairman of the United States Commission to the international conference on the safety of life at sea in London in 1913.

After his tenure as Secretary of Commerce, Alexander returned to the practice of law in Missouri. He served as a delegate to the state's constitutional convention in 1922–23.

He died there on February 27, 1936, at the age of 84, eighteen years later, after retiring in Gallatin. Alexander was interred in Brown Cemetery in Gallatin.

Joshua W. Alexander was a brother of the Delta Kappa Epsilon fraternity (Phi chapter).

== Family ==
Alexander married, the former Roe Ann Richardson (February 3, 1859 - March 18, 1940), the daughter of a judge, on February 3, 1876. The couple had eight children.

Alexander's son, aviator Walter Alexander, was killed in a propeller accident at Bolling Field in 1920. Another son, George F. Alexander, became a federal judge in Juneau, Alaska.

U.S. House of Representatives
Preceded by Frank B. Klepper	Member of the U.S. House of Representatives from Missouri's 3rd congressional district 1907–1919	Succeeded by Jacob L. Milligan
Preceded by William S. Greene	Chair of the House Merchant Marine Committee; 1911–1919	Succeeded by William S. Greene
Political offices
Preceded by William C. Redfield	United States Secretary of Commerce; 1919–1921	Succeeded by Herbert Hoover
