= Ricki Kgositau =

Trans-rights activist from Botswana

Tshepo Ricki Kgositau-Kanzaa is a trans-rights activist from Botswana who lives in South Africa.

In 2017, she was the first trans women to have her preferred gender identity legally recognised in Botswana.

== Personal life ==
Kgositau identified as a woman from a young age. In 2011, she requested to have her gender identity correctly noted as female on her Omang (English: National Identify Card) by the Civil and National Registration Office, but they were unable to make the change.

In 2017, the Botswana High Court ordered the government to recognise her gender identify as a woman, making her the first trans women to have her preferred gender identity legally recognised in Botswana.

Kgositau lives in South Africa.

== Career and advocacy ==
Kgositau is a director at Gender Dynamix trans-rights organisation. She is a trans rights advocate.

== Selected publications ==
- Liesl Theron and Tshepo Ricki Kgositau, The Emergency of a Grassroots African Trans Archive, Transgender Studies Quarterly 2(4): 578-583, 2015
