= Julius L. Wieman =

American politician (1864–1902)

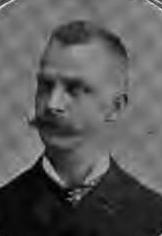
- Wieman in 1897

Member of the New York State Senate from the 9th district
- In office January 1, 1896 – December 31, 1898
- Preceded by: Timothy Sullivan
- Succeeded by: Joseph Wagner

Member of the New York State Assembly from the Kings County 18th district
- In office January 1, 1894 – December 31, 1895
- Preceded by: James Graham
- Succeeded by: George E. Waldo

Personal details
- Born: May 30, 1864 New York City, U.S.
- Died: October 31, 1902 (aged 38) New York City, U.S.
- Party: Republican
- Occupation: Politician

Julius L. Wieman (May 30, 1864 Brooklyn, Kings County, New York – October 31, 1902 Williamsburg, Brooklyn, New York City) was an American politician from New York.

== Life ==
He attended Turn Hall (a German school) and Public School No. 18, both in Brooklyn. Then he engaged in the importing of china and glassware. Later he engaged in the real estate and insurance business.

Wieman was a member of the New York State Assembly (Kings Co., 18th D.) in 1894 and 1895.

He was a member of the New York State Senate (9th D.) from 1896 to 1898, sitting in the 119th, 120th and 121st New York State Legislatures.

On December 30, 1899, the outgoing judge of the Third Municipal District Court, William Schnitzspan, appointed Wieman as Chief Clerk of the Court, for a term of six years. Two days later, the newly elected judge, William P. Lynch, upon taking office refused to recognize Wieman and appointed John W. Carpenter as Chief Clerk. The case was taken through the courts, and the New York Court of Appeals decided against Wieman.

In 1901, Wieman was appointed as Chief Clerk of the Kings County Court. He died on October 31, 1902, at his home at 695 Bushwick Avenue in Williamsburg, Brooklyn, of "typhoid pneumonia".

== Sources ==
- The New York Red Book compiled by Edgar L. Murlin (published by James B. Lyon, Albany NY, 1897; pg. 175f, 404 and 511)
- Sketches of the members of the Legislature in The Evening Journal Almanac (1895; pg. 57)
- APPOINTMENTS IN BROOKLYN in NYT on December 31, 1899
- ROW OVER COURT CLERKSHIP in NYT on January 2, 1900
- Ousting of a Court Clerk Invalid in NYT on February 16, 1900
- DEATH LIST OF A DAY; Julius L. Wieman in NYT on November 1, 1902

New York State Assembly
Preceded by James Graham	New York State Assembly; Kings County, 18th District; 1894–1895	Succeeded by George E. Waldo
New York State Senate
Preceded by Timothy D. Sullivan	New York State Senate; 9th District; 1896–1898	Succeeded by Joseph Wagner
