= Theron Wasson =

American geologist (1887–1970)

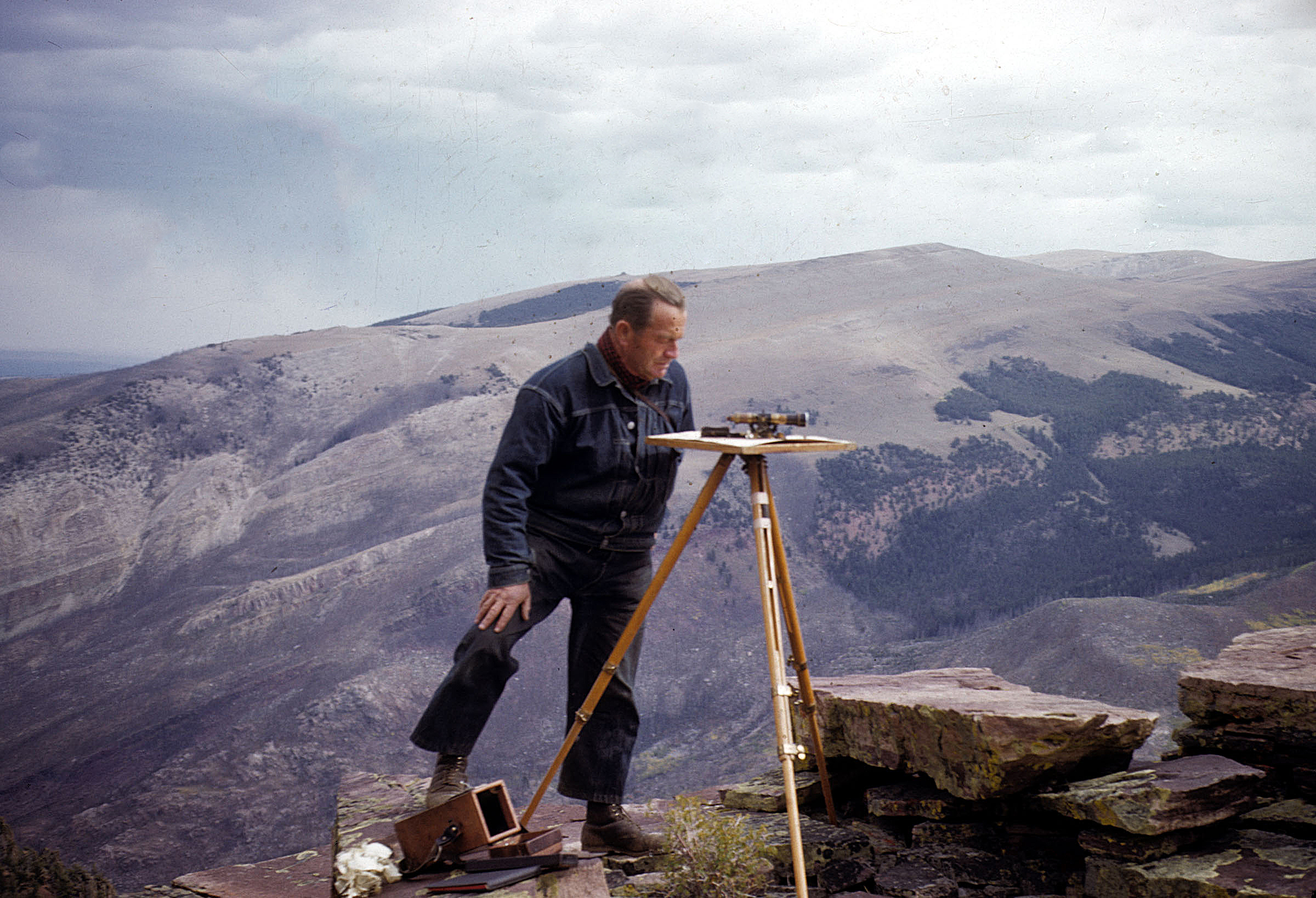
Geologist Theron Wasson surveying over Jakeys Fork, Wind River range, near Dubois, Wyoming, 1941.

Theron Rhodes Wasson (1887–1970) was a leading American petroleum geologist and engineer, who pioneered the use of geophysical surveys to find oil and gas.

== Biography ==
Wasson was born on his parents’ farm near Springville, New York on April 23, 1887. His interest in geology began in high school at the Griffith Institute in Springville, from which he graduated in 1905. He earned a Bachelor of Science from the Carnegie Institute of Technology (now the Carnegie Mellon University) in Pittsburgh, PA in 1910, and that institution gave him an Award of Merit in 1951. From 1910-1915 he did engineering work in CA, including designing a dam on the Feather River. From 1916-1917 he worked as a geologist in NJ and OK, and enlisted in the US Army in 1917. He was commissioned as a second lieutenant at the First Army Engineer’s School at Langres, France in May 1918, and served as the city engineer of Sinzig, Germany during the US occupation in 1919. From 1919-1920 he did graduate work in geology at Columbia University in New York, NY, where he met his future wife, geologist and teacher Isabel Bassett Wasson. They were married in 1920 and had three children; Elizabeth W. Bergstrom, a biologist; Edward B. Wasson, a petroleum geologist; and Anne Harney Gallagher, an art historian. Theron and Isabel divorced in 1953, and he married Ann Hand in 1959. He died in 1970 and was buried in Springville.

== Career ==
After his graduate studies, he was hired in 1920 as a geologist for the American Oil Engineering Corporation, and in 1921 he conducted the first surveys of the potential for oil exploration in eastern Ecuador with Joseph Sinclair, a consulting geologist. He was hired as the chief geologist with the Pure Oil Company in 1922, a position he held until 1952, when he became a senior geologist for that company. He worked for Pure Oil in Tulsa, OK, Columbus, OH, and finally in Chicago, IL. He excelled at finding new oil and gas fields—he was called "Pure's top oil hunter"—and was one of the first petroleum geologists to use geophysical survey data. He was credited with finding major oil fields in Venezuela in 1922, in Michigan in 1927, in southern Illinois in 1936, and the Cumberland Field in Oklahoma in 1940. In 1927, he and his staff used geophysical data to find the large Van oil field in Texas, and in 1937 it was also used by him and his staff (working with Superior Oil) to find the Creole field in Louisiana in the Gulf of Mexico, which was the first offshore oil well in the world in tidal waters; see also Offshore oil and gas in the Gulf of Mexico and Oil platform history. He was profiled in National Petroleum News in 1929, was called "one of the leading geologists of the world" in a 1940 article about oil reserves, and was quoted as an "authority on oil reserves" in Popular Mechanics in 1944. He spoke regularly at regional and national conferences about oil discoveries.

Wasson entered private practice as a consulting geologist in 1954. He was active in numerous professional societies; for example, he chaired the annual convention of the American Association of Petroleum Geologists (AAPG) in Chicago in 1946, and was made an honorary member of that group in 1961. He advised the geology departments at Princeton and Northwestern universities, and served on committees of the American Petroleum Institute, which gave him a Certificate of Appreciation in 1955. He was a fellow of the Geological Society of America and the American Geographical Society.

From the 1940s to near the end of his life, Wasson spent his summers at the CM Ranch & Simpson Lake Cabins near Dubois, Wyoming, where he shared his knowledge of natural history with other visitors. He helped survey some of the nearby Wind River Range, and a creek in that area was named after him, Wasson Creek. A memorial plaque was placed on a boulder along a trail near Wasson Creek after his death.
