= Liesl Theron =

South African trans activist

Liesl Theron is a South African trans activist and the co-founder of Gender DynamiX organisation.

== Personal life ==
Theron was born in South Africa to an Afrikaans speaking family and has a 2 1/2-years-younger sister.

In 1992, she came out as a lesbian at the age of 20. Her mother struggled with her sexually at first, but later wrote a book about her coming to terms with it.

As of 2008 through 2013, she was in relationship with photographer Zanele Muholi.

== Career ==
Theron is the co-founder of Gender DynamiX trans rights advocacy organisation. Theron was the inaugural Executive Director for Gender DynamiX from its inception, 2005 until she stepped down, June 2014

Theron supported Sasha, one of South Africa's first openly trans refugees to navigate entry into South Africa. Theron continued to support a number of trans refugees and asylum seekers from various African countries. Throughout her tenure at Gender DynamiX, Theron advocated for a number of important issues, such as Access to Health Care and other rights for trans people in general. After Theron left Gender DynamiX as Director, she became a consultant In 2016, she received the Global Transgender Heroes award from the True Colors Fund. Theron moved January 2018, to Mexico to live in Mexico City. Since moving to Mexico, Theron explored with her consultancy to start working with LGBTIQ and specifically Trans organizations in the Caribbean. As a result, Theron was one of the two co-consultants leading on an important and first research of its kind in the Caribbean, with 1080 Lesbian, Bi, Queer and Trans masculine respondents. The "From the Fringes to Focus - A deep dive into the lived-realities of Lesbian, Bisexual and Queer women and Trans Masculine persons in 8 Caribbean countries" research highlighted issues about sexual orientation, gender identity, education, health, domestic violence, access to rights, mental health and reproductive health. Theron worked with a few more activists (Julius Kaggwa, Victor Mukasa and Gabrielle le Roux) to bring alive, end of 2022 the Trans and Intersex History in Africa website

== Selected publications ==
- Liesl Theron, Mariam Armisen, and John McAllister Where do we go from here?: A call for critical reflection on queer/LGBTIA+ activism in Africa, Pambazuka News, 2016
- Sherwood, J., Lankiewicz, E., Castellanos, E., O’Connor, N., Theron, L., & Restar, A. Assessing inclusion of trans people in HIV national strategic plans: a review of 60 high HIV prevalence countries. Journal of the International AIDS Society, [s. l.], v. 24, n. 11, p. 1, 2021. DOI 10.1002/jia2.25837
- Liesl Theron and Ricki Kgositau, The Emergency of a Grassroots African Trans Archive, Transgender Studies Quarterly 2(4): 578-583, 2015
- Jessica Scott and Liesl Theron, The promise of heteronormativity: Marriage as a strategy for respectability in South Africa, 2017
