= Inge Theron =

British entrepreneur (born 1976)

- Born: Inge Theron; 15 May 1976 (age 50)
- Education: Glen High Pretoria
- Occupations: Entrepreneur, Columnist, Spa Designer
- Known for: FaceGym; ITANDA; Hollywood Domino; Bleach Media
- Awards: Pure Beauty Award for skincare innovation
- Website: inge-theron.com

Inge Theron is a London-based British skincare specialist, former radio personality, columnist and entrepreneur. She is mostly known for her brand FaceGym which she founded in 2015. She specializes in the Wellbeing, Longevity and Beauty industries.

== Biography and career ==
Theron grew up in Pretoria and Johannesburg with her mother who was a travel guide and historian. She completed her education from The Glen High School. She moved to London during 1994 to study journalism and started to work at Middlesex Hospital, hosting a radio show. She then moved to Virgin Radio where she worked with Chris Evans. Theron then moved further and worked for Jonathan Ross and finally commenced a branding agency of her own. In 2008, Theron co-founded Hollywood Domino, with actress Daya Fernandez. The concept of Hollywood Domino is based on a 400 years old Chinese Game which Theron and Fernandez reinvented. Theron then moved to India and consequently under mentorship of Gillian de Bono, started her column Chronicles of a Spa Junkie in the Financial Times. During her time as the columnist, Theron travelled across the world including Mexico, Uluru, Japan, Turkey and Amazonia to work with the local tribes to explore traditional and indigenous skincare mechanisms. She also provided consultancy through her agency ITANDA for the Spa Designing during that time, which included implementation of spa studios of Grace Belgravia of Henri Chenot, Faena Miami, Bulgari Hotel London etc.

=== FaceGym ===
In 2015, Theron founded FaceGym, a skincare brand which aims to utilize the concept of 'workout' and 'muscle manipulation' to the face in order to give it a better appearance. Facegym was launched in 2015, opening a concession in Selfridges, London. In December 2016, it opened its first standalone store in Kings Road, Chelsea, England. In May 2018, Theron's Facegym opened a concession in Saks, New York City and in January 2019, its first standalone in the US, in Soho, New York. As of March 2021, Facegym has its stores at 6 locations in the UK and five in the United States.
