= Theron Baldwin =

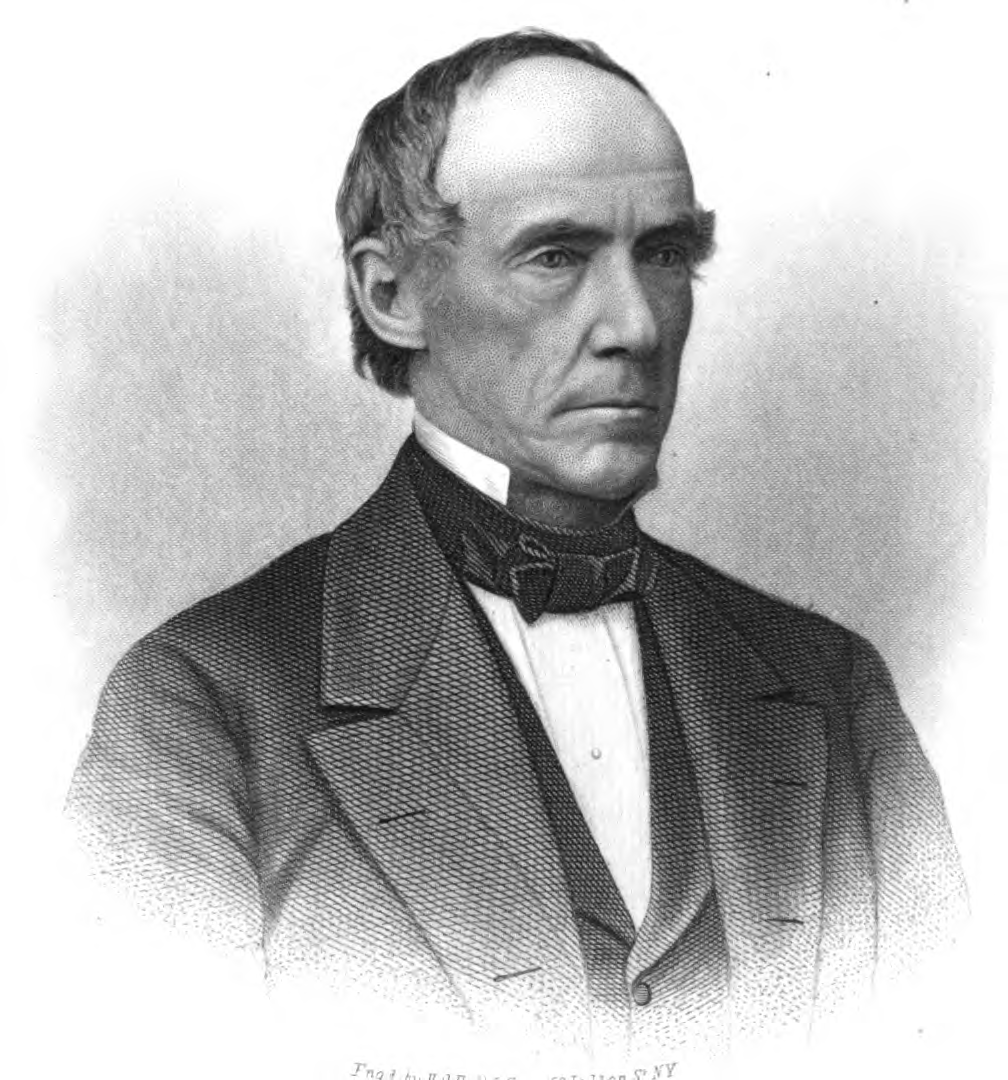
- Born: July 21, 1801; Goshen
- Died: April 10, 1870 (aged 68); Orange

Theron Baldwin (July 21, 1801 – April 10, 1870) was an American Congregational minister.

Theron Baldwin was born on July 21, 1801 in Goshen, Connecticut. While a school-teacher, he was converted and united with the Church, and a year later, when he was twenty-one years old, he began preparation for college under the tuition of his pastor, Rev. Joseph Harvey, D.D. In a little more than a year he entered Yale College, and duly graduated in 1827, when he immediately began study in the theological department. He was especially conspicuous in the organization of a society among the students for the evangelization of the Mississippi valley and points beyond. All arrangements were completed in the spring of 1829, and efforts were at once begun to procure the funds for the contemplated seminary in Illinois, which was a part of the scheme of the organization. In a few months the requisite sum (ten thousand dollars) was pledged to the cause. Baldwin and Rev. J. M. Sturtevant were ordained at Woodbury, Connecticut, Aug. 27, 1829, and set apart for the work in Illinois, for which state they immediately departed; and Illinois College was founded at Jacksonville by these two men. Baldwin at the same time began preaching at Vandalia, and subsequently organized the first Illinois Sunday School Union at Jacksonville, of which he was appointed secretary. In 1831 the trustees of Illinois College selected him as agent to solicit funds for the institution in the East; and two years after he returned to Illinois, and entered the service of the American Home Missionary Society as an agent for reaching the emigrants moving westward. Meantime, Capt. Benjamin Godfrey was proposing to found the Monticello Female Academy and was urging Baldwin to become its principal. Accepting the position, he dissolved his connection with the American Home Missionary Society in 1837, and for the rest of his life was directly identified with education in the new states, and was not inaptly called a "missionary educator." He died in Orange, N. J., April 10, 1870.

This article incorporates text from The Cyclopedia of Biblical, Theological, and Ecclesiastical Literature, by James Strong and John McClintock, a publication from 1880, now in the public domain in the United States.
