= Jean-Paul Theron =

Jean-Paul Theron (born 1957 or 1958) is a former French doctor who practiced in French Polynesia. He was barred from practicing in 2022 after prescribing unauthorized treatments for COVID-19.

Theron was born in Tunisia, and moved to French Polynesia as a child when his father was transferred there to work on the French nuclear testing program. After training as a doctor, he practiced for several years in the Marquesas Islands and Tuamotus. In the early 2000s he served as the leader of the Union of Medical Profession of French Polynesia. He later worked as an advisor to the Minister of Health.

During the COVID-19 pandemic he advocated unauthorised treatments such as hydroxychloroquine and ivermectin, leading to a complaint to the medical council. In September 2021 he was arrested when he allegedly assaulted a court officer attempting to serve formal notification of this complaint. His trial has been repeatedly postponed.

In March 2022 he was barred from practicing medicine for three years.

He stood as a candidate for French Polynesia's 1st constituency in the 2022 French legislative election, but came last with 747 votes.
