= Catholic Benevolent Legion =

- Abbreviation: CBL
- Successor: Knights of Columbus
- Formation: 1881
- Dissolved: 1969
- Type: Catholic fraternal service

The Catholic Benevolent Legion was a Roman Catholic benevolent society providing life insurance founded in New York in 1881. A parallel Catholic Women's Benevolent Legion was founded in 1895. The Legion merged with the Knights of Columbus in 1969.
