= Annique Theron =

South African businesswoman

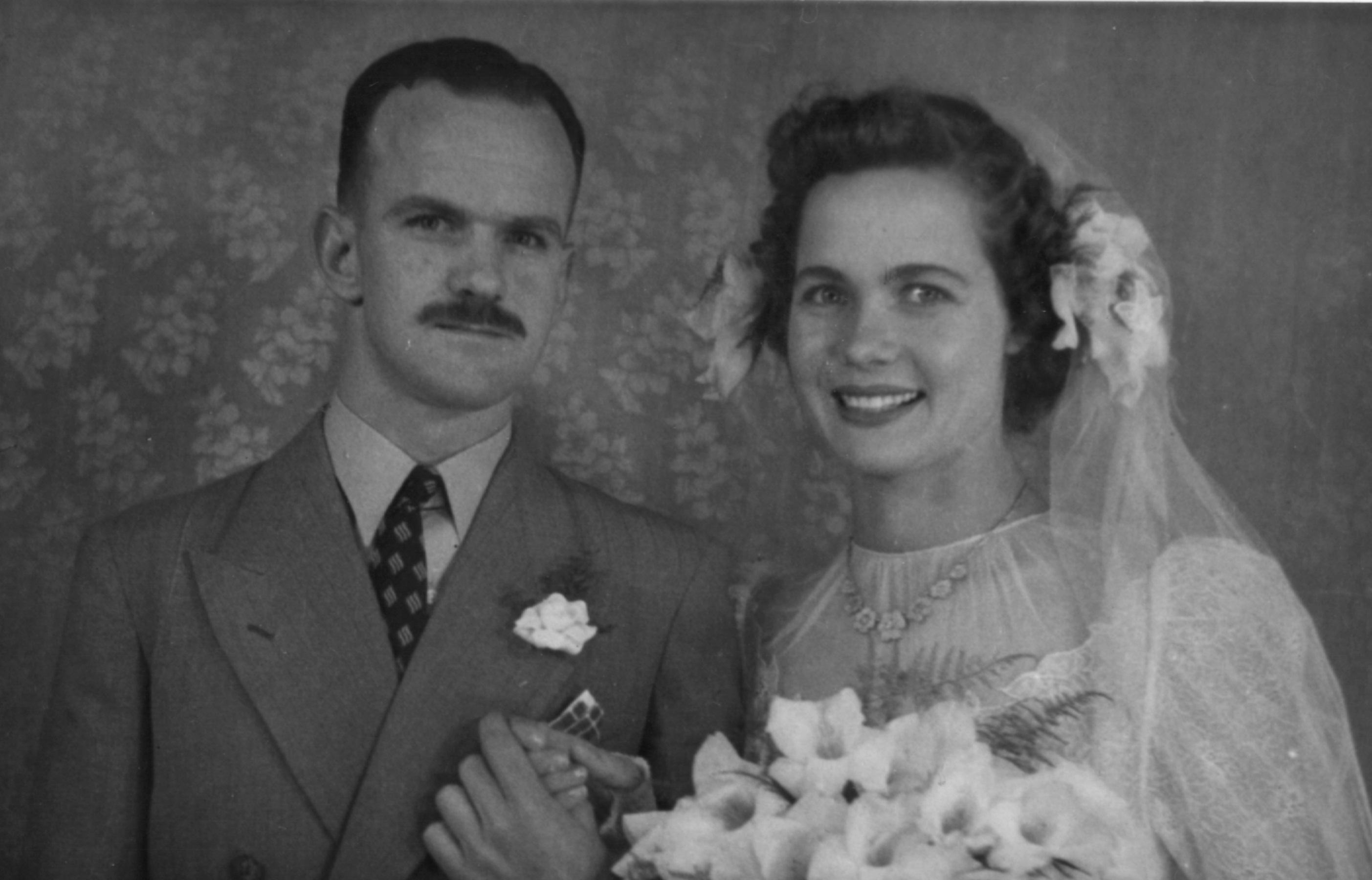
Wedding day photo of Hendrik Meiring and Annekie Theron

Annique Theron (born Anna Elizabeth [Annekie] Heystek in North Transvaal, April 18, 1929 - Pretoria, February 22, 2016) was a South African businesswoman best known for her line of cosmetics and health care products featuring rooibos as a main ingredient.

== Youth ==
Theron's father was Antonie Marius Heystek (1903–1981), and her mother was Anna Susanna (née Jordaan, 1908–1997). Her paternal grandfather was Antonie Marius Heystek (1872–1933), who married twice and had 16 children.

Theron, born on the eve of the Great Depression, grew up on Mooikloof farm near Potgietersrus, where she lost her family while still young. The traumatic event spurred her to study in and move to Pretoria, where she met her future husband, Hendrik Meiring Theron (Licthenburg, North Transvaal [now North West Province], April 10, 1922 - Warmbaths (Bela-Bela, North Transvaal [now Limpopo], September 20, 1990). She wanted to become a doctor, but since her parents could not afford to send her to university, she became a secretary. After her wedding in 1950 (she was 21), her firstborn, Henk, was born in early in the 1950s, and her second son, Marius, two years later. Theron already wanted to start a business, a rarity for women at the time.

The family's first daughter, Suzette (married name Ferreira), was born more than 12 years after the last son, and the fourth child, Lorinda, early in 1967. Lorinda was colicky as a baby and weakened by allergies. On April 8, 1968, when Lorinda was 14 months old, Theron heated rooibos tea and combined it with her bottle milk, finding the child's condition instantly improved. Crediting the rooibos for the results, she set out to make the world aware of the healing power of this native plant.

== Rooibos wealth ==
She was at first met with skepticism, but was undeterred by the lack of resources and support. In 1971, she began Annekie Theron Ondernemings, which several years later was renamed Forever Young (Edms.) Bpk. The company manufactured health and skin care products made from rooibos extract. To give the products an international flair, Annekie named the line Annique.

Annique received two gold medals in 1997 from the World Intellectual Property Organization in Geneva. For her development of the Annique products, Theron was also named Female Inventor of the Year.

Theron, whose husband died in 1990, was 72 when she earned her doctorate in alternative medicine from the Commonwealth Open University, fulfilling in a way her lifelong dream of becoming a doctor. In 2005, she set up a new headquarters in Irene, Pretoria, and the following year the 35th anniversary of the business was celebrated with a special rejuvenation cream. Ernest du Toit was appointed chief executive of the company on February 1, 2008, and two years later the Theron family sold the company. With the celebration of the 40th anniversary of the business in 2011, the name was changed once more to Annique Health and Beauty. As of 2016, the company employed 15,000 consultants and marketed 200 products.

Theron published her autobiography, Manna – My verhaal van rooibostee en wonderwerke ("Manna - My story of rooibos tea and miracles") in 2009.

== Death ==
Her memorial service was held on Sunday, March 3, 2016, in the auditorium of the Moreleta Park Reformed Church in Pretoria.

== Court battle over the name rooibos ==
In 1994, Theron registered the word "rooibos" as a trademark in the United States of America for $40 (at the time around R140). In 2001, she offered the rights to use the trademark free of charge to a business partner, Virginia Burke-Watkins. This led to anger in the South African rooibos industry when exporters found out they could not market their product in America under the name "rooibos". Theron told Hanlie Retief of Rapport that the rooibos industry had subjected her for years to "absolute, blatant discrimination." She reported that "Ever since 1968 the bureaucrats of the industry have wanted to keep me away from rooibos. They stalled my packers' license for 16 years so I couldn't ship and pack the tea." She viewed the trademark as sweet revenge, telling Retief: "Now I keep them out of America."

The resulting lawsuit between Rooibos Beperk, which processed and marketed rooibos tea, and Theron and Burke-Watkins' Forever Young, dragged on until 2005, when the American owners of the trademark agreed to cease using it there. Burke-Watkins, a good friend of Theron, would thereafter market the Annique products in America through her company, Burke International.

A dispute arose when Burke-Watkins sent letters to American distributors of rooibos tea ordering them to either cease marketing it or compensate her company. The South African producers claimed rooibos was a generic name never registered as a trademark. Finally a Missouri district court ordered Burke-Watkins to cancel her trademark. She at first decided to appeal, but later abandoned the idea. The dispute ravaged local products with R6 million in legal costs and eve involved the provincial government of the Western Cape.

== Family conflicts ==
In 2010, Theron's youngest daughter, Lorinda, brought a suit in the High Court of South Africa in Pretoria against her mother and other trustees of the Manna Forever and H.M. Theron Trust. She wanted trustees (including her mother) removed from the board so new ones could be appointed. She also wanted to ban them from trading on a property that was already on the market for R10 million, namely the headquarters of Forever Young. She later dropped the suit.

In August of that year, Annique Theron sued Lorinda's husband, Armand Danie Theron (née Fick, but took his wife's last name) after alleging, among other things, that she had poisoned her late husband. The order demanded Armand Danie Theron not "assault, threaten, intimidate, or harass" Annique Theron (then living in Kyalami) or three of her children - Henk, Marius, and Suzette Ferreira - and their families. After the second court order was granted, Henk Theron explained to Beeld about the May order: "In a nutshell, Lorinda claims that I and [Dr. Theron], and to a lesser extent [Marius and Suzette] have 'stolen' her inheritance." He claimed that Armand Danie Theron was the "driving force" behind Lorinda's lawsuit. In 2014, Lorinda and Armand were estranged and she was reconciled with her family and made peace with her mother.

== Sources ==
- (af) Rooibos se ‘ma’, dr. Annique Theron, sterf in die ouderdom van 86, Huisgenoot, February 22, 2016. URL accessed 1 March 2016.
- (en) Biographical sketch of Dr. Annique Theron on the website of Annique Health and Beauty. URL accessed 1 March 2016.
- (en) Theron family locked in battle of wills, iol.co.za, May 27, 2010. URL accessed 1 March 2016.
- (en) 'Moeder van Rooibos' en Annique-pionier sterf, Maroela Media, February 22, 2016. URL accessed 1 March 2016.
- (af) Stigter van Annique-reeks, dr. Annique Theron, sterf, sarie.com, February 22, 2016. URL accessed 1 March 2016.
- (af) Rooibos now on everyone's lips (on the trademark of the word "rooibos"). URL accessed 2 March 2016.
