= Elsie Richardson =

American community activist (1922–2012)

- Born: Elsie Maynard; February 24, 1922; New York City
- Died: March 15, 2012 (aged 90); Brooklyn, New York
- Education: Pratt Institute, 1972; New School for Social Research, 1979
- Organization(s): Central Brooklyn Coordinating Committee; Bedford Stuyvesant Restoration Corporation
- Spouse: Victor Richardson

Elsie Richardson (February 24, 1922 – March 15, 2012) was a community activist and civil servant in Brooklyn, New York. She is best known for founding the Central Brooklyn Coordinating Council and contributing to the Bedford Stuyvesant Restoration Corporation, created after she advocated to Robert F. Kennedy.

== Early life and education ==
Elsie Eugenia Richardson (née Maynard) was born on February 24, 1922, on the Upper West Side to George and Albertha Maynard. Her parents had immigrated from Nevis in 1911, and raised their four children in East Harlem. They were also followers of Marcus Garvey and the Universal Negro Improvement Association and instilled in Richardson a sense of community and pride in her identity.

Richardson attended Washington Irving High School and graduated in 1938 with a diploma in secretarial studies, though she worked in factories and as a nanny after graduation. She was drawn to activism at an early age after her family's tenement apartment burned down, presumably by the landlord in hopes of an insurance payout. In 1941, she participated in the Harlem bus boycotts organized by Adam Clayton Powell Jr.

Through the National Youth Administration agency and the help of African-American attorney Simon N. Hillman, Richardson got her first job as a secretary. After the outbreak of World War II, she moved to Washington D.C., where she worked as a secretary for the Office of Defense Transportation, and advocated for more employment opportunities for secretaries of color to U.S. senators James M. Mead and Robert F. Wagner.

Richardson earned a bachelor's degree from Pratt Institute in 1972, and a master's degree from the New School for Social Research in 1979.

== Activism in Brooklyn ==
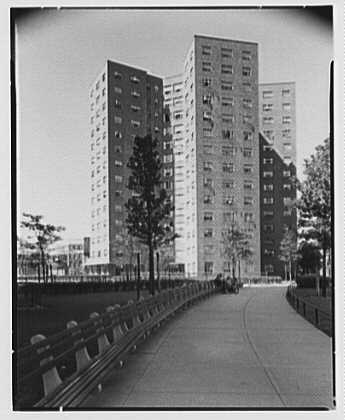
Albany Houses in Brooklyn, 1952.

In 1946, Richardson returned to New York and married Victor Richardson on April 28, 1946. The couple moved into Albany Houses, a public housing project in Crown Heights. She worked as a secretary at a public school, but also became an active community organizer. In addition to doing youth outreach at the Stuyvesant Community Center, Richardson held a leadership role in the Albany Houses' Tenant Association, whose advocacy work led to the creation of the St. John's Recreation Center, the Crown Heights Health Center, and Public School 243. In the 1950s, the Richardsons relocated to Bedford-Stuyvesant, where she continued to be active in community organizing.

=== Central Brooklyn Coordinating Council ===
In the 1950s and 1960s, Bed-Stuy was undergoing dramatic changes with white flight to suburban areas and an influx of black populations to the neighborhood. New and old residents also faced housing discrimination, political segregation, and denial of city services, making it one of the poorest neighborhoods in the city. Left without political power, Black residents created community networks in the form of civic groups, churches, civil-rights organizations, block associations, and parent-teacher associations. In 1952, Richardson, along with Charles Ward and others, organized the Central Brooklyn Coordinating Council, an umbrella organization for over 140 of these local groups that served as a de facto political mediator. Other prominent female activists involved with the CBCC included Shirley Chisholm, Almira Kennedy Coursey, and Lucille Mason Rose.

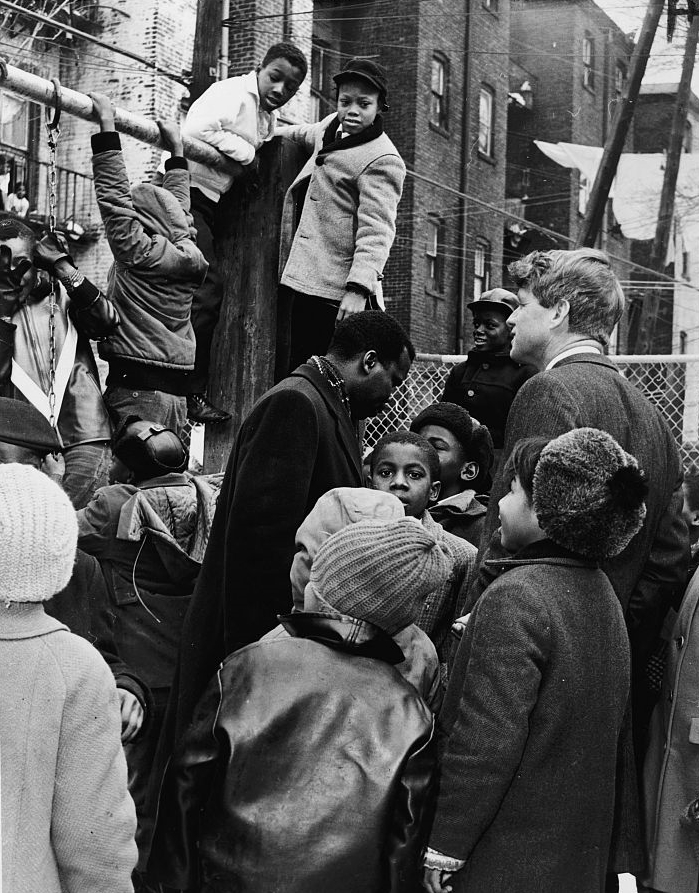
Robert F. Kennedy and Donald F. Benjamin of the CBCC on the 1966 tour of Bedford-Stuyvesant.

In 1966, Richardson invited senators Robert F. Kennedy and Jacob Javitz to tour Bed-Stuy as emissaries for Lyndon B. Johnson's "War on Poverty" initiatives. Richardson led Kennedy on the tour in February 1966, with the final stop being a community meeting at a local YMCA, where she is remembered as saying, "We've been studied to death, what we need is bricks and mortar!" in response to Kennedy's proposal for a study on the neighborhood. This community meeting was the impetus for Kennedy, along with Javits and Mayor John Lindsay, to establish the Bedford Stuyvesant Restoration Corporation. They also designated the neighborhood as a federal Model Cities demonstration project, leading to an influx of new housing, businesses, and community resources for the area.

=== Bedford Stuyvesant Restoration Corporation ===
Richardson was a key member in the formation of the BSRC after Robert Kennedy enlisted her to put together a committee of local activists to create blueprints for the renewal of the neighborhood; Richardson had already drawn up these blueprints two years earlier with the CBCC and urban planners, notably Ronald Shiffman, from the Pratt Institute for Design. Her ideas included fixing up historic brownstones using black-owned construction firms, building parks and planting trees, setting up financial cooperatives, and funding local businesses.

The earliest iteration of the BSRC included two separate corporations: the Bedford-Stuyvesant Renewal and Rehabilitation Corporation (R&R), which was headed by five Black women from the CBCC, including Richardson, Lucille Rose, Louise Bolling, Almira Coursey, and Constance McQueen. Its sister organization was the Bedford-Stuyvesant Development and Services Corporation (D&S), which consisted largely of high-profile white, male business leaders, lawyers, and financiers such as Eli Jacobs and André Meyer.

Richardson and the other women from the CBCC faced animosity from R&R chair Thomas Russell Jones and Sonny Carson, both Black men that Kennedy hoped would connect the newly formed BSRC to the male youth of the neighborhood. Jones and Carson felt the women's leadership roles were emasculating, and ultimately R&R was dissolved; while Coursey joined the board of BSRC, Richardson and the other women returned to their work with the CBCC.

The Bedford-Stuyvesant Restoration Corporation was responsible for the creation of community resources including the Kosciusko Pool, Medgar Evers College, the Billie Holiday Theater, Restoration Plaza and the Pratt Center for Community Development. Richardson's early ideas for the corporation would help it become a model for grassroots community development and rebuilding efforts across the country.

== Later work ==
After the dissolution of R&R, Richardson continued to be active in the CBCC as well as other local organizations, committees, and associations. She helped found the Weeksville Heritage Center after the discovery of artifacts from a 19th-century free Black community. Richardson also worked as the Education and Public Relations Coordinator for the Model Cities Program and later as a School Community Coordinator for the New York City Board of Education.

== Death and legacy ==
In 1998, Richardson was honored by the Bedford-Stuyvesant Restoration Corporation for her work, and by the New York City Commission on Human Rights in 2010. In 2008, she participated in an oral history project with the Center for Brooklyn History, and in 2023, she was featured prominently in an exhibit at the Museum of the City of New York.

Richardson died in Brooklyn on March 15, 2012, at the age of 90.
