= Almira Kennedy Coursey =

Brooklyn community activist and educator (1914-1996)

- Born: 5 June 1914; New Bern, North Carolina, U.S.
- Died: 26 August 1996 (aged 82); Brooklyn, New York, U.S.
- Education: St. Augustine's College (B.A., Education, 1934); Teachers College, Columbia University (M.A., Personnel Administration)
- Occupations: Educator, community activist
- Years active: 1940s–1970s
- Known for: Advocacy for renovation and redevelopment of Herbert Von King Park
- Movement: Community development, urban education, women's uplift
- Spouse: Henry Ellis Coursey
- Children: 3

Almira Kennedy Coursey (June 5, 1914 - August 26, 1996) was a community activist and organizer based in Bedford-Stuyvesant in Brooklyn, New York. She is best known for advocating for the renovation and redevelopment of Herbert Von King Park.

== Early life ==
Almira Kennedy Coursey was born on June 5, 1914, in New Bern, North Carolina to Augustus T. and Juanita C. Kennedy. She was oldest of four children and grew up in Winston-Salem, where she also attended high school. Coursey attended St. Augustine's College in Raleigh, and studied English and geography before graduating with a degree in education in 1934. At St. Augustine, she worked as the assistant to the dean of women for the college, a role that she held throughout the 1930s. Coursey also helped to form St. Augustine's National Alumni Association, and served as the secretary for ten years. In the late 1930s, she worked as a teacher in Clayton, North Carolina, and developed the "Three W's" program for teen girls, which instilled values of womanhood, wholesome recreation, and willingness to serve.

== Brooklyn activism and education work ==
In 1940, Coursey moved to Bedford-Stuyvesant, Brooklyn, where she worked as a teacher and later the assistant principal at Macon Junior High School, also known as Intermediate School 258. She met and married Henry Ellis Coursey not long after arriving in New York, and they went on to have three children together. While teaching, she also earned a master's degree in personnel administration from Teacher's College, Columbia University. In 1964, Coursey began working with the Central Brooklyn Coordinating Council (CBCC), a coalition of civic clubs, churches, civil-rights groups, and block associations led by Elsie Richardson. Other notable female activists in the CBCC included Shirley Chisholm and Lucille Rose. Through the affiliated Tompkins Park Committee, also known as the Tompkins Park Recreation and Cultural Association, Coursey lobbied the city to improve Herbert Von King Park, then known as Tompkins Park. Her advocacy eventually led to the construction of the Kosciuszko Pool, designed by Morris Lapidus, as well as renovations to the park's facilities and the addition of the Eubie Blake Auditorium, the Herbert Von King Cultural Arts Center, and Little League fields in 1969. By 1965, Coursey was serving on the board of both the CBCC and the affiliate group, Youth in Action (YIA), which later became Community Sponsors, Inc. In 1967, Coursey led organizing efforts to establish a community daycare in Bed-Stuy, which supported the Young Mothers Program. After a period of infighting and reorganization in the late 1960s, she was one of the only former CBCC board members to join the board of the Bedford-Stuyvesant Restoration Corporation (R&R), a community corporation developed by Robert F. Kennedy and Thomas Jones.

In 1968, Coursey began working as a special assistant to the vice chancellor of the City University of New York, where she developed programs to assist minority students. She also worked in the CUNY Office of Urban Affairs, and garnered institutional support and grant funding for the Society For the Preservation of Weeksville, now known as the Weeksville Heritage Center. Coursey continued her advocacy work into the 1970s, and served on city-wide committees for poverty and education under the mayoral administrations of Robert F. Wagner and John Lindsay.

Coursey died in Brooklyn on August 29, 1996.On September 27, 2011, the outdoor amphitheater in Herbert Von King Park was named in her honor, in a ceremony attended by the New York City Parks & Recreation Commissioner, Adrian Benepe, as well as members of the Tompkins Park Recreation & Cultural Association and Coursey's daughter, Henrietta.
