= Lucille Mason Rose =

African-American civil servant (1920–1987)

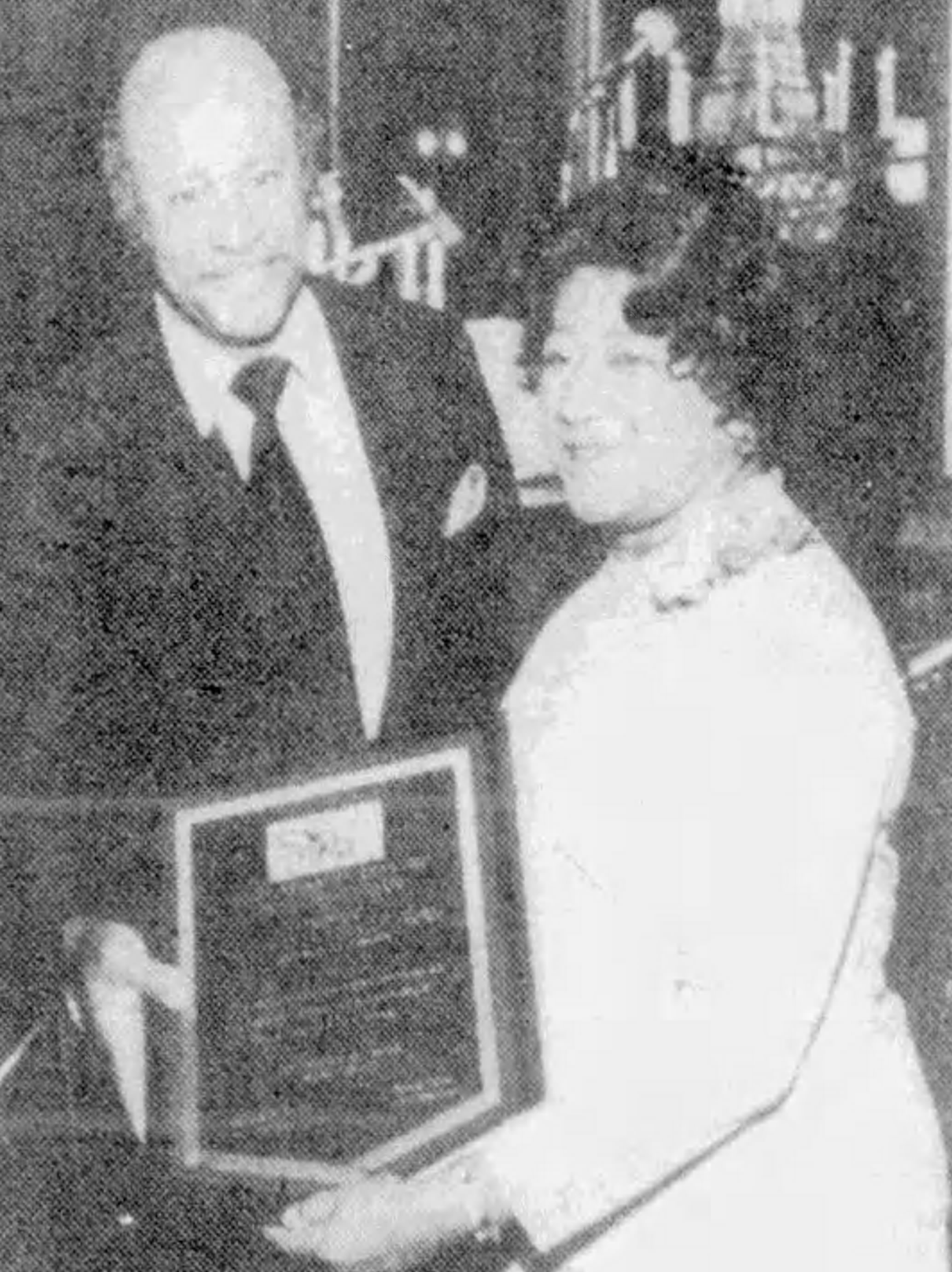
- Rose (right) in 1977
- Born: September 27, 1920; Richmond, Virginia
- Died: August 15, 1987 (aged 66); Brooklyn, New York
- Education: Brooklyn College, New School
- Occupation: Civil servant
- Years active: 1949-1978
- Organization: Bedford Stuyvesant Restoration Corporation
- Title: New York City Deputy Mayor
- Predecessor: Paul Gibson Jr.

Lucille Mason Rose (September 27, 1920 - August 15, 1987) was an African-American civil servant and political activist who was the first woman to serve as a New York City Deputy Mayor. She also served as the first woman president of the Catholic Interracial Council.

== Biography ==
=== Early life ===
Lucille Mason was born in Richmond, Virginia on September 27, 1920, and moved with her family to Brooklyn, New York at the age of seven. Her parents owned and operated a soul food restaurant called Mason Dining Room around this time, which Rose's mother later took over and ran independently after Rose's father's death. While in high school, Rose joined the National Association for the Advancement of Colored People, and won their "Miss Brooklyn" contest in her twenties. She graduated from Girls' High School in 1937. During World War II, she worked as a welder on the construction of the USS Missouri (BB-63) at the Brooklyn Navy Yard.

=== Career ===
Rose began her public service career in 1949 as a fiscal clerk in the Department of Social Services. In the 1960s, she became involved with community activism in the Bedford-Stuyvesant neighborhood through the Central Brooklyn Coordinating Council (CBCC), with fellow activists like Shirley Chisholm, Almira Kennedy Coursey, and Elsie Richardson. She took night classes at Brooklyn College, and earned a degree in economics in 1963, later going on to earn her master's in manpower planning and economics from the New School in the late 1970s. In 1964, Mayor Robert F. Wagner hired her as the director of the Bedford-Stuyvesant office of the city's Department of Labor, where she helped establish and oversee the Neighborhood Manpower Service Center. She was a founding director of the Bedford Stuyvesant Restoration Corporation, and served as the vice-chair for the board from 1983 until her death in 1987. Rose was named deputy commissioner of the city Manpower and Career Development Agency by Mayor John V. Lindsay in 1970. In 1972, she was appointed Commissioner of Employment, under the Human Resources Agency, where she helped to develop job training and placement programs. In 1977, Mayor Abraham Beame named her the Deputy Mayor of Employment, making her the first woman to be appointed to the role.

Beyond her official obligations, Rose served in various chair positions of the Brooklyn branch of the NAACP in the 1960s, and for other civic and political organizations such as Medgar Evers College, Key Women, the Salvation Army Advisory Committee, the National Council of Negro Women, and St. Mary's Hospital. Shortly before her death, she was also elected president of the Bed-Stuy chapter of the Lioness Club, the women's sector of the Lions Club.

Rose was a member of the Democratic National Committee in the 1980s, and served on the National Democratic Executive Committee. In 1980, she was a delegate to the Democratic National Convention. That same year, Rose ran for the New York State Senate, representing District 18, but lost to incumbent Thomas J. Bartosiewicz.

=== Religion ===
In 1951, Rose converted to Catholicism and began attending Our Lady of Victory Church in Brooklyn. She was an active member of her religious community, and served as the first woman president of the Catholic Interracial Council from 1981 to 1985. She was also a board member for the National Conference of Christian and Jews for several years.

== Awards ==
In 1965, Rose received the Woman in Action Award from the Sister of Concord Baptist Church for her work with the Bed-Stuy Department of Labor. Rose was honored by orthodox Jewish organization, the Agudath Israel of America in 1975 for her employment programs designed for economically disadvantaged ethnic groups. In 1977, Rose was named the Alumna of the Year by Brooklyn College. In 1979, she received the "Black Brooklynite" award from the New Muse Community Museum. After serving as the president of the Catholic Interracial Council, Rose was given the John LaFarge Memorial award for her work.

Shortly before her death in 1987, Rose received the Thomas S. Boyland Award from the New York State Association of Black and Puerto Rican Legislators.

== Personal life and death ==
In 1939, Rose married Peyton Rose, a carpenter. They had one son together, Cornelius.

Rose died from a heart attack on August 15, 1987, at Brookdale Hospital in Brooklyn. Her funeral was attended by several politicians and public officials, including Edward Koch, David Dinkins, Shirley Chisholm, and Percy Sutton.
