= Herbert Von King Park =

Public park in Brooklyn, New York

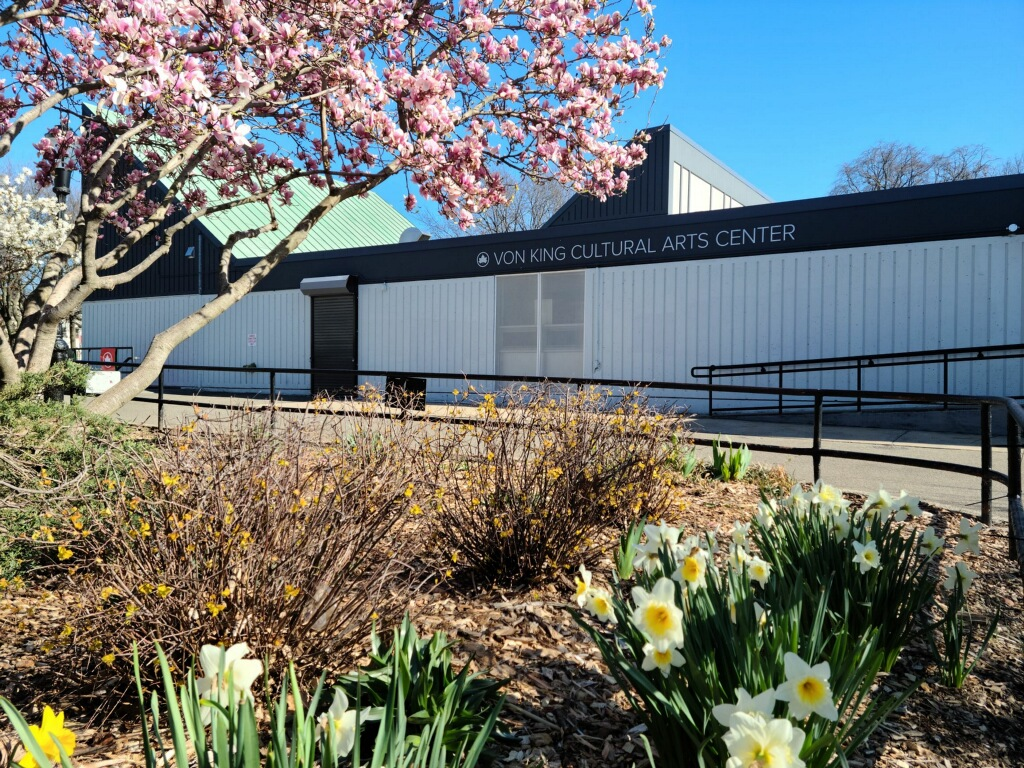
- Interactive map of Herbert Von King Park
- Type: Urban park
- Location: Brooklyn, New York City, United States
- Coordinates: 40°41′22″N 73°56′47″W
- Area: 7.819 acres (0.03164 km^{2})
- Created: 1857
- Owner: NYC Parks
- Operator: Prospect Park Alliance
- Status: Open all year
- Public transit: Bedford-Nostrand Avenues station

Herbert Von King Park is an urban park in the Bedford–Stuyvesant neighborhood of Brooklyn in New York City. It was one of the first parks established in Brooklyn, from land originally acquired in 1857. The park was originally named Tompkins Park, after former New York governor Daniel D. Tompkins, and was renamed in 1985 in honor of Herbert Von King, a longtime local community organizer who was nicknamed the "mayor of Bedford–Stuyvesant". The park is bounded on the north by Lafayette Avenue, to the east by Tompkins Avenue, to the south by Greene Avenue, and to the west by Marcy Avenue.

The park contains a ballfield, a playground, and the Herbert Von King Cultural Arts Center, the latter of which opened in 1973. The facility also has the Almira Kennedy Coursey Amphitheatre, named after a longtime advocate for the facility's construction.

== Description ==
Herbert Von King Park is located in Bedford–Stuyvesant, Brooklyn, New York City; it is bounded to the north by Lafayette Avenue, to the east by Tompkins Avenue, to the south by Greene Avenue, and to the west by Marcy Avenue. Its total size is 7.819 acres (0.03164 km^{2}).

The park contains a baseball field, playground, and barbecue areas, in addition to the Herbert Von King Cultural Arts Center, which holds classes and events.

== History ==
=== Early history and establishment ===
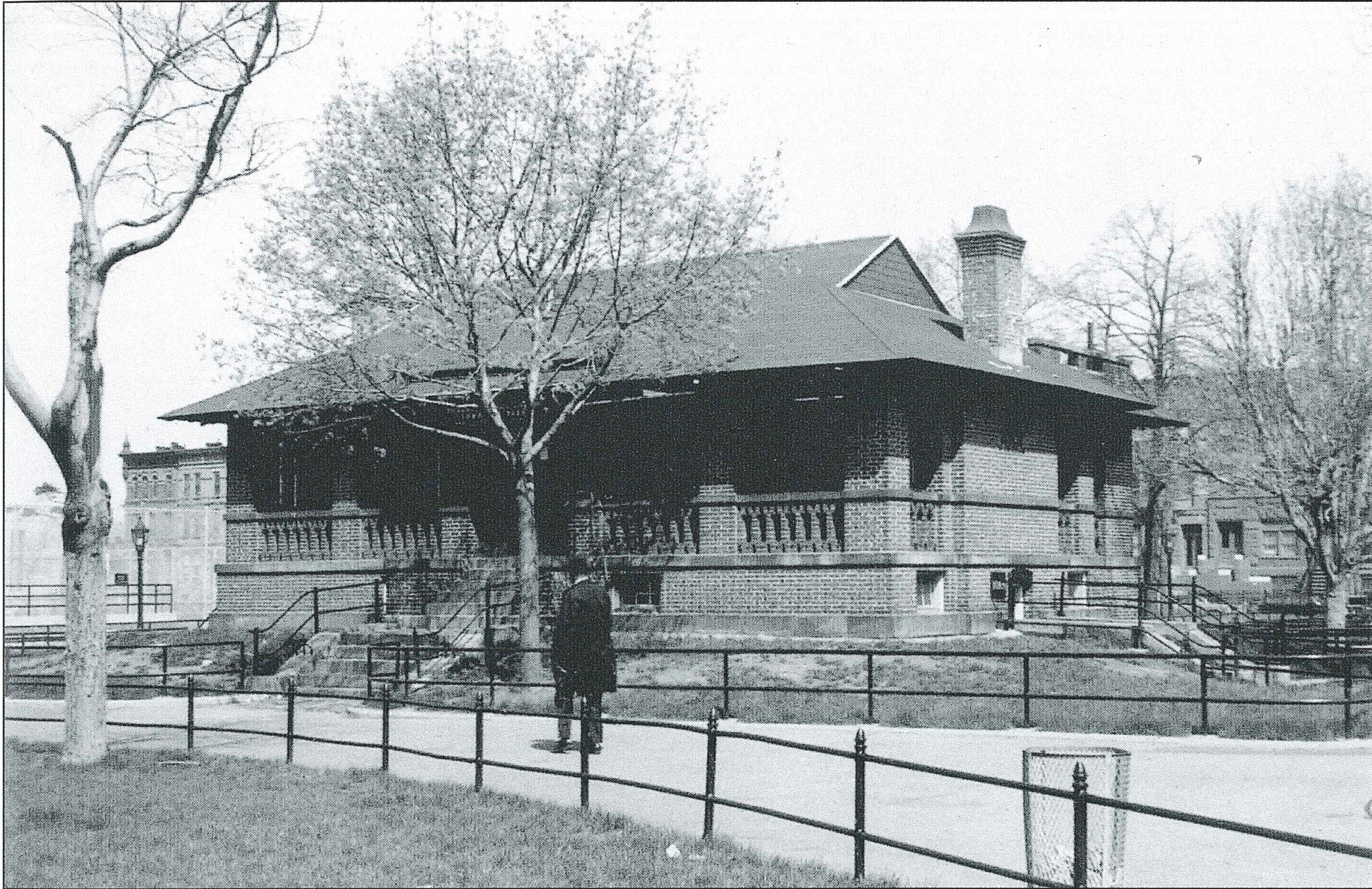
Image of the Tompkins Park Library before it was destroyed in a fire in 1969

The Lenape indigenous people of the Northeastern Woodlands were the first inhabitants in what is now the New York City metropolitan area. In 1694, Jeremias Remsen purchased a farm in the Wallabout section of Kings County, which later represented the borders of Brooklyn. In 1777, a childless descendant of Remsen's, Jeremiah Remsen, died and left his estate to Barent Johnson, a Kings County land owner married to Anna Remsen. Johnson and Remsen's son Jeremiah Johnson was born in 1777, served as mayor of Brooklyn from 1837 to 1838, and died in 1852. Jeremiah's grandson, Tunis Johnson, was one of the largest landowners in King's County by the time of his death in 1912. In 1857, part of Tunis's family estate was condemned and acquired by Brooklyn later to become one of the first parks of the city.

In June 1857, the Common Council of the City of Brooklyn voted to establish Tompkins Park, making it the first park established by the city of Brooklyn. Funding was achieved six months later, as the incorporation papers were misplaced and had to be relocated. In 1870, the Parks Commission took control of the park, and in 1871, James Stranahan commissioned Calvert Vaux and Frederick Law Olmsted – architects for Central and Prospect parks – to submit a plan for the park. The land was originally named Tompkins Park, after former New York governor Daniel D. Tompkins. The original design was highly symmetrical and did not include any trees or paths, believing they would be used "for clandestine purposes by people of bad character." In the 1870s and 1880s, the park was used for military review as well as public leisure; in 1875, the Tompkins Park Croquet Club was formed. In 1878, a shelter and veranda meant for women and children was constructed.

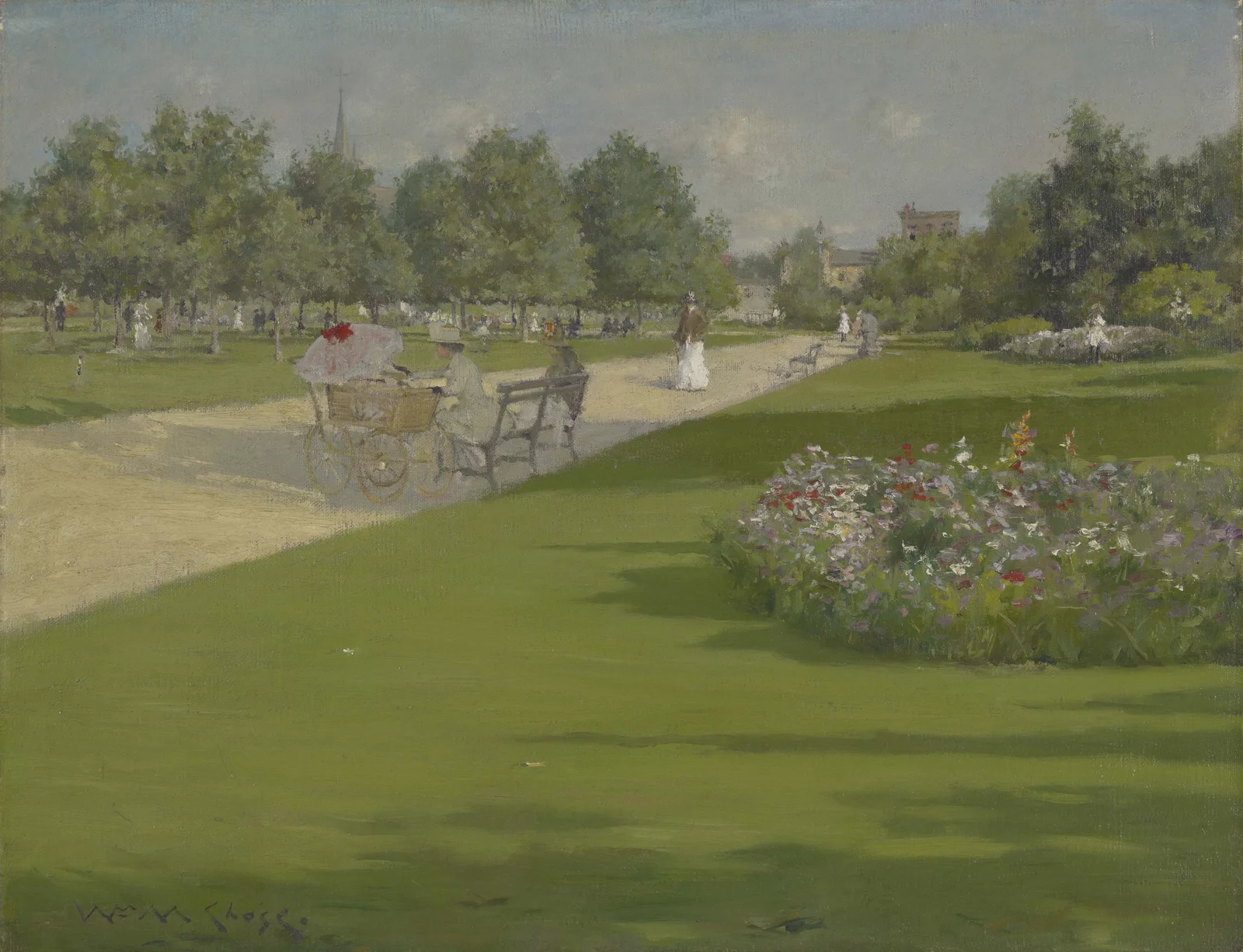
Tompkins Park, Brooklyn by William Merritt Chase, 1887.

Artist William Merritt Chase, a resident of Bedford-Stuyvesant, was a frequent visitor of the park and painted it at least five times in the 1880s, creating some of the earliest color representations of the neighborhood.

=== Tompkins Park Library and early development ===
Tompkins Park (now Herbert Von King Park) in a 1929 Belcher Hyde insurance atlas, showing its original symmetrical pathway layout.

In 1899, the Brooklyn Public Library Association organized a campaign to establish a free library and reading room in Tompkins Park. Led by Mary E. Craigie and a committee of neighborhood residents, the initiative received the support of Park Commissioner George V. Brower, who offered the use of an existing brick building in the center of the park. The committee solicited donations of books and money to equip and maintain the facility. The library opened in late July 1899 and quickly attracted substantial public use. By October, it had registered approximately 1,515 members and circulated 3,260 books during that month. In addition to its book collection, the library provided newspapers and magazines and operated a traveling library service for neighborhood residents. In 1901, the library became part of the Brooklyn Public Library system.

The park underwent further improvements during the early twentieth century. A concert space was constructed in 1915, followed by renovations to the library and women's shelter in 1916, when the two facilities were combined. A playground was added in 1927, while subsequent landscaping changes altered the park's original layout through the redesign of pathways and the planting of trees.

=== Community rehabilitation (1960s) ===
In 1963, the Tompkins Park Recreation and Cultural Association was formed as an extension of the Central Brooklyn Coordinating Council, led by Almira Kennedy Coursey, with the goal of improving the park and the neighborhood by extension. Coursey described the park as a "catch‐all for junkies and drunks".

During the 1960s, neighborhood residents organized efforts to rehabilitate Tompkins Park. The Citizens' Committee for the Rehabilitation of Tompkins Park, chaired by Almira Kennedy Coursey, worked with city agencies to improve recreational facilities and restore the park as a community gathering place. By November 1964, improvements included a Little League baseball field, new walkways, benches, a bandstand, a wading pool, and children's play areas. Community leaders continued to advocate for additional recreational facilities, including a swimming pool.

The library burned down in 1969, and was shut down on March 14 of that year.

=== Cultural development (1970s) ===
In 1970, the Citizens' Committee for the Rehabilitation of Tompkins Park organized a Black Arts Festival in the park, reflecting ongoing efforts to expand cultural programming in the neighborhood. The festival featured actor Robert Hooks, jazz drummer Max Roach, African dancers and drummers, and local youth theater and musical groups. Artwork created by children participating in Operation Head Start was also exhibited. The event received support from several community organizations, including the Bedford Stuyvesant Restoration Corporation and the New York City Parks Department's Division of Cultural Affairs.

Following years of advocacy by the Tompkins Park Association, a new recreation and cultural center was constructed on the site of the former park library. Built at a cost of $1.5 million, the facility included an outdoor sunken amphitheater, recreation lounges, an information center, and an indoor auditorium named after local musician Eubie Blake. The auditorium features a mural by Akwesi M. Asante depicting African American leaders, including David Dinkins and Frederick Douglass. The Tompkins Park Recreation and Cultural Center officially opened on March 13, 1973, with a ceremony attended by Mayor John Lindsay and U.S. Representative Shirley Chisholm.

The center subsequently became a venue for public performances and community cultural activities. During the summer of 1973, its amphitheater hosted a series of free rock concerts sponsored by the city's Department of Cultural Affairs, beginning with a performance by the band Backbone on July 7.

=== Renaming and later developments ===
In 1985, the park was renamed Herbert Von King Park, after a local community activist who was nicknamed the "mayor of Bedford–Stuyvesant." Von King was a building contractor who became involved in political and economic redevelopment programs for the Bedford-Stuyvesant neighborhood, serving on the local PTA, the Police Civilian Committee, the Magnolia Tree Earth Center, and the New York chapter of the John Brown Memorial Association. Von King also founded and led Boy Scout Troop 219 in Bed-Stuy, and received the Silver Beaver Award, the Boy Scouts' highest honor for leaders, in 1945, as well as awards from the New York State Senate, the City Council, and the 81st Precinct. In 2011, the outdoor amphitheater was named after Almira Kennedy Coursey, who died in 1996.

In 2022, the Herbert Von King Cultural Arts Center reopened after a $7 million renovation, with repairs and accessibility features added to the Eubie Blake Theater. The renovation also included a media lab and increased cultural programming.

== Transportation ==
The Bedford-Nostrand Avenues station is located roughly 1 block, or 0.2 miles, from Herbert Von King. It is also served by the MTA's B38 and B43 bus lines.

== Activities ==
In addition to the Herbert Von King Cultural Arts Center, the park includes basketball courts on its southeast corner, as well as a dog run and a baseball diamond on the northwest corner.

In the late 2010s and early 2020s, Food Not Bombs operated a foodshare program located in Herbert Von King Park.
