= Billie Holiday Theatre =

Theater in Brooklyn, New York City

The Billie Holiday Theatre
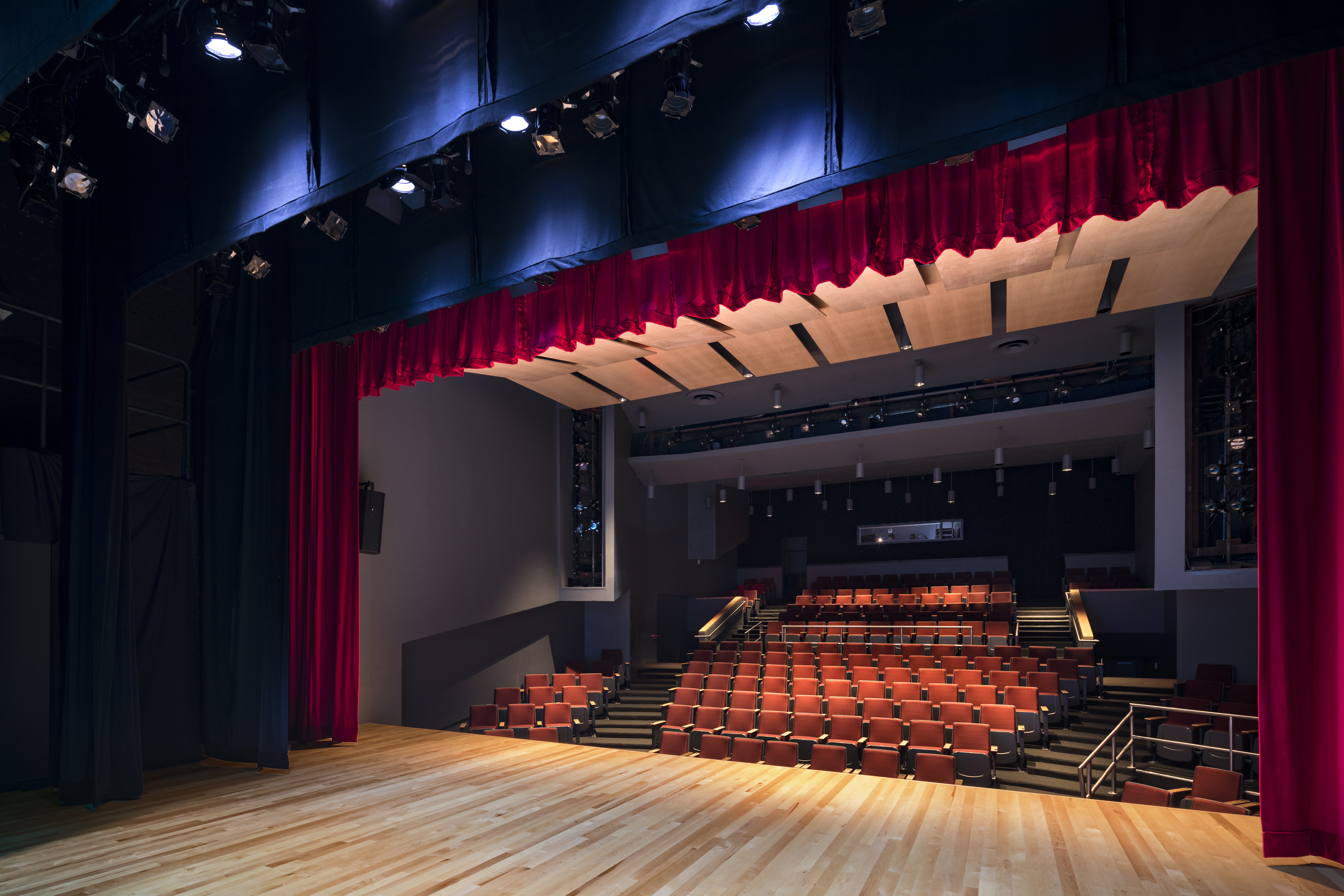
- Interactive map of The Billie Holiday Theatre
- Coordinates: 40°40′N 73°56′W
- Owner: Bedford Stuyvesant Restoration Corporation
- Capacity: 218
- Public transit: Nostrand Avenue station

Construction
- Opened: May 1972
- Renovated: 2015
- Architect: Murphy Burnham & Buttrick Architects

Website
- http://thebillieholiday.org

The Billie Holiday Theatre (a.k.a. the "Billie," or the "BHT,") is an AUDELCO and Obie Award-winning theatre that aims to provide "complete and authentic portrayals" of the African diaspora experience, as well as "artistic and institutional residencies and ... educational programming to people of all ages."

Founded in 1972, with roots in both the Civil Rights and the Black Arts Movements, the Billie has been called "one of the nation’s premier Black playhouses." In 2023, it was recognized with a National Medal of the Arts, the nation's highest arts award. U.S. President Joe Biden called the theater "an incredible place ... nurturing a new generation of Black playwrights, performers.”

The first Black theatre to transfer a hit play to Broadway, along with 50 percent of the financing from the Black community, the Billie has cultivated some of the "[n]ation’s most renowned Black actors, writers, designers, and musicians," including Lena Horne, Smokey Robinson, Ben Vereen, Samuel L. Jackson and Jay-Z. In 2020, the Billie was awarded a $5 million-dollar "Black Seed" grant by the Mellon Foundation to help Black theatres nationwide "forge national partnerships and new commissions." In 2022, the New York State Senate marked the Billie's 50th Anniversary with a commemorative resolution in recognition of its contributions.

== History ==
Franklin A. Thomas, the first Black President of the Ford Foundation, used his position to revitalize his hometown neighborhood of Bedford-Stuyvesant through the Bedford-Stuyvesant Restoration Corporation, America's first community development corporation, resulting in the 218-seat Billie.

Thomas’ vision for the Billie was “to expose the second largest black community in America to the arts while providing an outlet for local talent.” Marjorie Moon was appointed the theatre's executive director. Under Moon, the "theatre built a community audience by placing Bedford Stuyvesant citizens on the theatre’s board.”

== Renovation ==
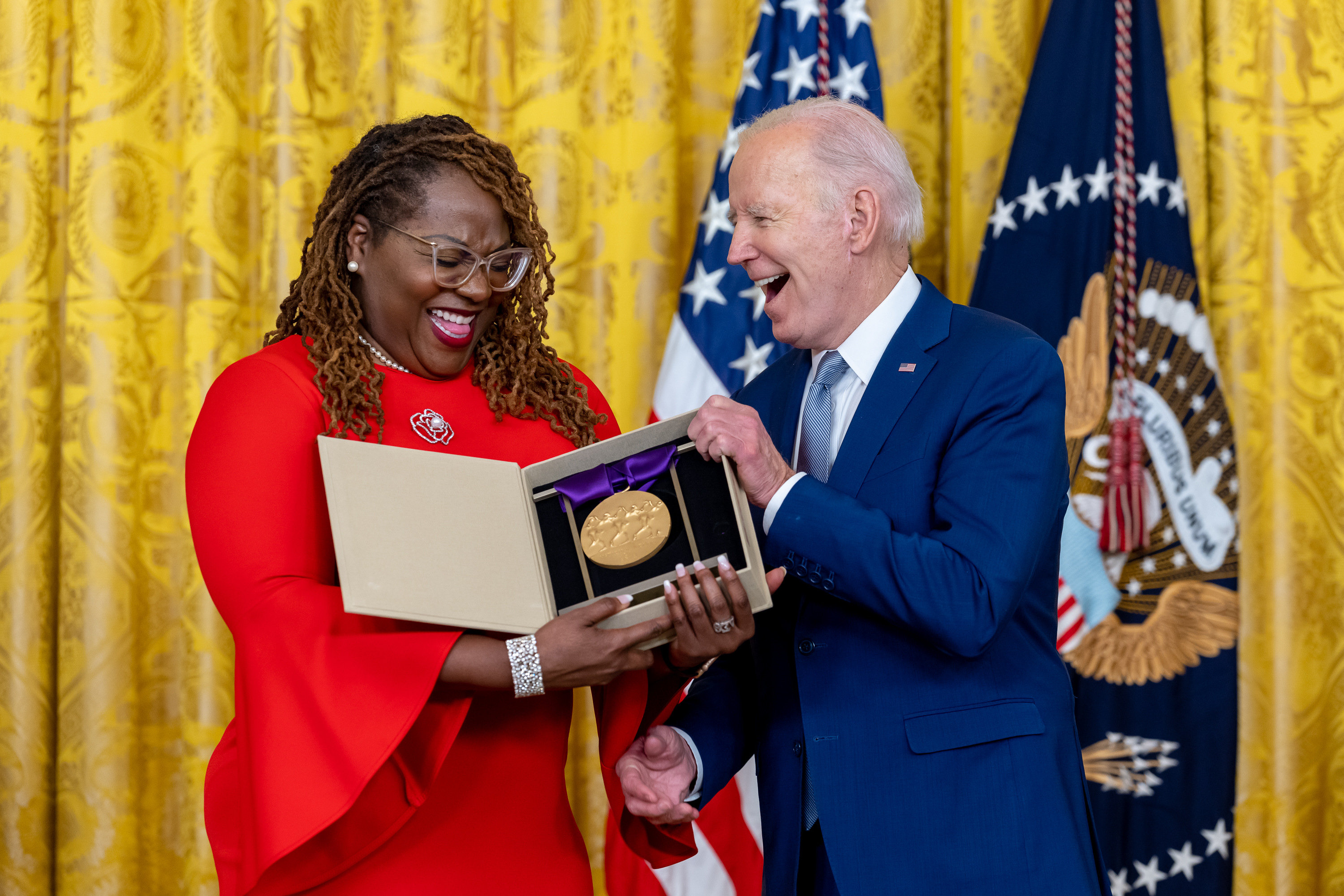
President Joe Biden presents the 2023 National Medal of the Arts to Blondel Pinnock on behalf of the Billie Holiday Theatre at the National Arts and Humanities Medal Ceremony, Tuesday, March 21, 2023, in the East Room of the White House. (Official White House Photo by Cameron Smith)

In 2015, the theatre moved to Fort Greene for two years while the Bedford-Stuyvesant location was being renovated. The renovations to The Billie Holiday Theatre were designed by MBB Architects. The newly renovated theater reopened in May 2017 at 1368 Fulton Street, inside the Bedford Stuyvesant Restoration Corporation's Restoration Plaza, and is part of a $6 million superblock in Bedford-Stuyvesant, which is slated to eventually house an ice-skating rink and a supermarket, in addition to the theatre.

== Notable performers ==
- Debbie Allen
- Tichina Arnold
- Obba Babatunde
- Yasiin Bey
- Eubie Blake
- Bill Cobbs
- Elaine Graham
- Lena Horne
- Weldon Irvine
- Samuel L. Jackson
- Ebony JoAnn
- Stephanie Mills
- John Henry Redwood
- Max Roach
- William “Smokey” Robinson
- Rondell Sheridan
- Phyllis Yvonne Stickney
- Samm-Art Williams
- Carol Woods
- Ben Vereen
- Jay Z
