= Paul Gibson Jr. =

Paul Peyton Gibson, Jr.

Deputy Mayor of New York City
- In office 1974–1978
- Succeeded by: Lucille Mason Rose

Personal details
- Born: August 5, 1927 Manhattan, New York, U.S.
- Died: July 10, 2014 (aged 86) Jamaica, Queens, New York, U.S.
- Spouse: Married (62 years)
- Children: 2 sons
- Relatives: 1 sister, 4 grandchildren
- Education: Boys High School; City College of New York
- Occupation: Lawyer, airline executive, politician

Military service
- Branch/service: United States Army Air Forces
- Years of service: Post-World War II
- Rank: Unknown
- Unit: Stationed in the Philippines

Paul Peyton Gibson, Jr. (August 5, 1927 – July 10, 2014) was an American airline executive and New York City’s first black deputy mayor, serving as deputy mayor to Abraham Beame after being sworn into the position in 1974. Gibson was born in Manhattan in 1927. At eight years old, Gibson and his family moved to Brooklyn. He graduated from the Boys High School and later entered the City College of New York, where he also graduated from. Shortly after World War II, Gibson enlisted into the United States Army and was assigned to the Army Air Forces, and was mainly stationed in the Philippines. After his return from military service, he began a law firm. During the 1960s, Gibson began a political career and unsuccessfully ran for the Democratic nomination for a City Council seat in the borough of Queens. In 1966, he was granted a seat by American lawyer, Frank D. O'Connor, and later years served as his law secretary. In 1971, Gibson joined American Airlines and automatically became assistant vice president. Within a year from arrival into American Airlines, he became full vice president. Gibson served as New York's first black deputy mayor for four years. After resigning from his title, Lucille Mason Rose took over and became New York's first woman to become deputy mayor, whom was also black.

Gibson is survived by his wife of 62 years, one sister, two sons and four grandchildren. He died on July 10, 2014, aged 86 at his home in Jamaica, Queens, New York City, New York.
