= Franklin A. Thomas =

American businessman and philanthropist (1934–2021)

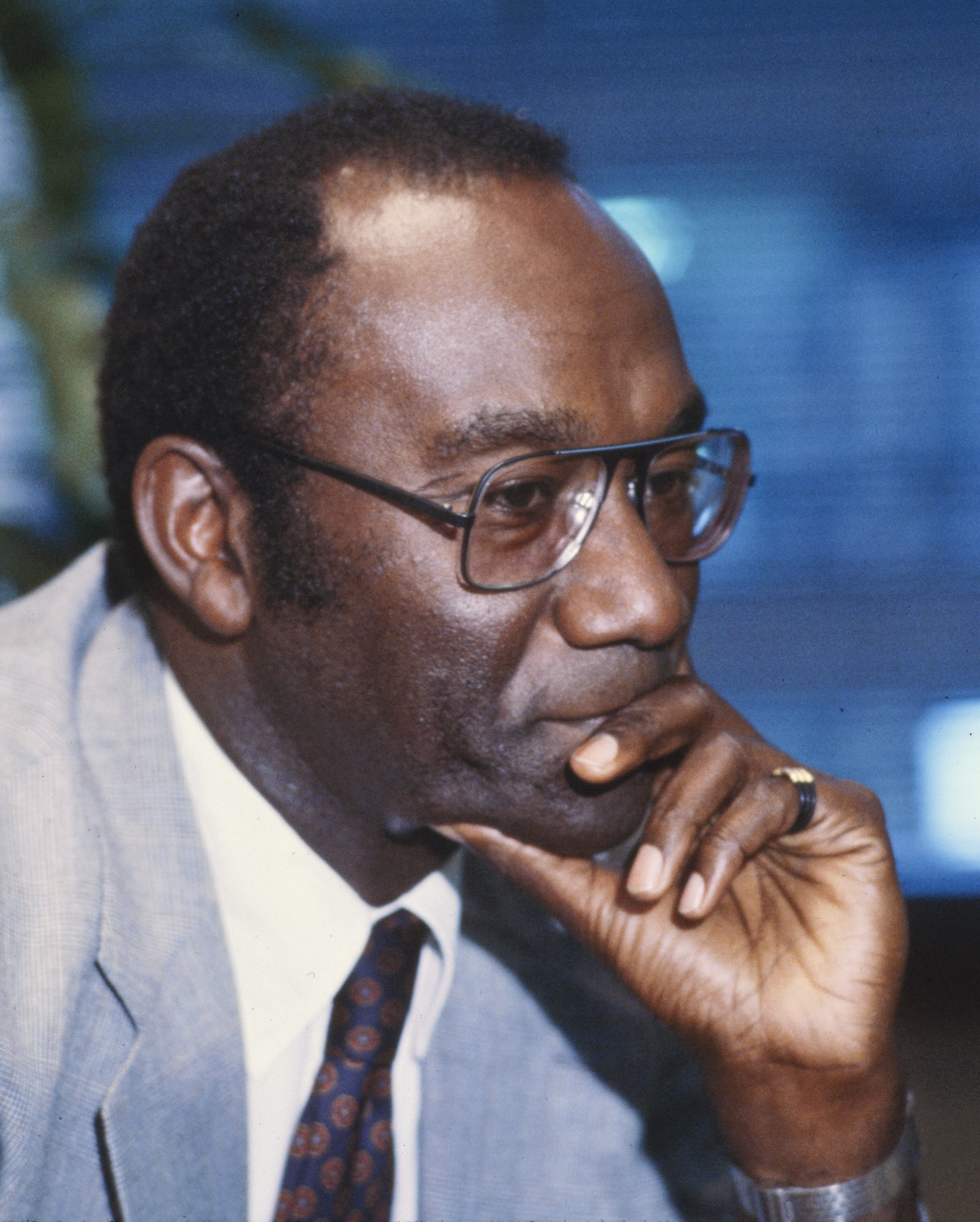
- Thomas in 1972
- Born: Franklin Augustine Thomas; May 27, 1934; New York City, New York, U.S.
- Died: December 22, 2021 (aged 87); New York City, New York, U.S.
- Education: Columbia University (BA, LLB)
- Occupations: Businessman, philanthropist
- Known for: First African American to lead the Ford Foundation

Franklin Augustine Thomas (May 27, 1934 – December 22, 2021) was an American businessman and philanthropist who was president and CEO of the Ford Foundation from 1979 until 1996. After leaving the foundation, Thomas continued to serve in leadership positions in American corporations and was on the board of the TFF Study Group, a nonprofit institution assisting development in South Africa. Thomas was chairman of the nonprofit organization September 11th Fund from 2001 to 2004 and was involved in the Nelson Mandela Children's Fund, having served as the manager of its American office.

== Early life and education ==
Franklin Augustine Thomas was born on May 27, 1934, in the Bedford-Stuyvesant neighborhood of Brooklyn. After the death of his father, his mother, Viola, an immigrant from Barbados, headed the household, where he was the youngest of six children, as a housekeeper and waitress. Thomas attended the Franklin K. Lane High School. He then graduated from Columbia College in 1956, where he was a star basketball player and the first African-American captain of an Ivy League team. He later graduated from the Columbia Law School in 1963 after serving as a navigator in the Strategic Air Command.

== Career ==
Thomas worked as an attorney for the Federal Housing and Home Finance Agency (now HUD) in 1963. Thomas was named Assistant U.S. Attorney for the Southern District of New York in 1964. He later served as Deputy Police Commissioner in Charge of Legal Matters for the New York City Police Department for two years, starting in 1965; he was the first African-American to hold the position. Thomas was the first president and chief executive officer of Bedford Stuyvesant Restoration Corporation (BSRC), a non-profit community development corporation, from 1967 to 1977. As president and CEO, Thomas led the organization renovating the exteriors of 3,682 buildings and 123 established businesses, and helped create 3,300 new jobs in the 96-block area. His successes at BSRC raised his profile nationally and he was well-regarded for his pragmatism and persuasiveness.

After leaving the Bedford Stuyvesant Restoration Corporation, Thomas headed a study of US policy toward South Africa for the Rockefeller Foundation recommending peaceful change. Alan J. Pifer, president of the Carnegie Corporation of New York, considered Thomas's direction of the study "brilliant." In 1979, Thomas became the first African-American to head a major foundation when he became president of the Ford Foundation, succeeding McGeorge Bundy. He was chosen out of 300 candidates; he had been a member of the Ford Foundation's board of trustees since 1977. His role came at a time where the foundations assets and resources were limited due to the stock market downturn in the 1970s and a large, cumbersome administration.

As president, he examined the organization's structure, financing, and grant-making practices, and initiated a six-part agenda that was intended to regain managerial and financial control which led to mass firings in 1982, prompting criticism from the trustees. During his tenure as president, he grew the foundation's portfolio of assets to over $6.5 billion; established new programs including the nation's largest community development support organization, Local Initiatives Support Corporation (LISC); and expanded its global reach. He also worked to improve the lives of women through the production of nonsexist textbooks, forming farm organizations in rural areas, increasing the number of female professionals at the Ford Foundation, and instituted paid paternal leave. In 1996, he left the Ford Foundation to concentrate on the problems and opportunities of South Africa as a consultant to the TFF Study Group, which built on his anti-apartheid efforts at the Ford Foundation.

In October 2001, Thomas was appointed the Chairman of the September 11 Fund, which was formed to support the victims, families, and communities affected by the September 11 attacks. He held the position until 2004, overseeing the collection of $534 million and awarding 559 grants totaling $528 million.

Thomas was elected to the American Philosophical Society in 2006.

=== Board of directors ===
Thomas was one of eight Citigroup Inc. directors who served on the boards of multiple corporations at the same time.

Thomas served on the board of directors of Cummins, Inc., Lucent Technologies, Inc., Alcoa CBS, and PepsiCo, Inc.

He was also the second African American to be elected to the Board of Trustees of Columbia University, after fellow Columbia College alumnus M. Moran Weston.

== Legacy and awards ==
In 1979, he was awarded an honorary degree from Columbia University.

In 2016, John Jay College established the Franklin A. Thomas Professorship in Policing Equity with $2.5 million in grants from the Ford Foundation and the Atlantic Philanthropies.

In 2020, he was awarded the Medal for Excellence by Columbia Law School.

In 2020, Thomas was portrayed by Jay Ellis on the FX and Hulu series Mrs. America.

== Personal life ==
Thomas married Dawn Conrada, later divorcing in 1972. The couple had four children: two boys and two girls. From 1971 to 1974, Thomas was romantically involved with Gloria Steinem after she interviewed him for an article in New York magazine. He later married Kate Roosevelt Whitney. Whitney is the daughter of James Roosevelt, granddaughter of Franklin D. Roosevelt and Harvey Cushing.
