= Thomas R. Jones (judge) =

American judge and politician

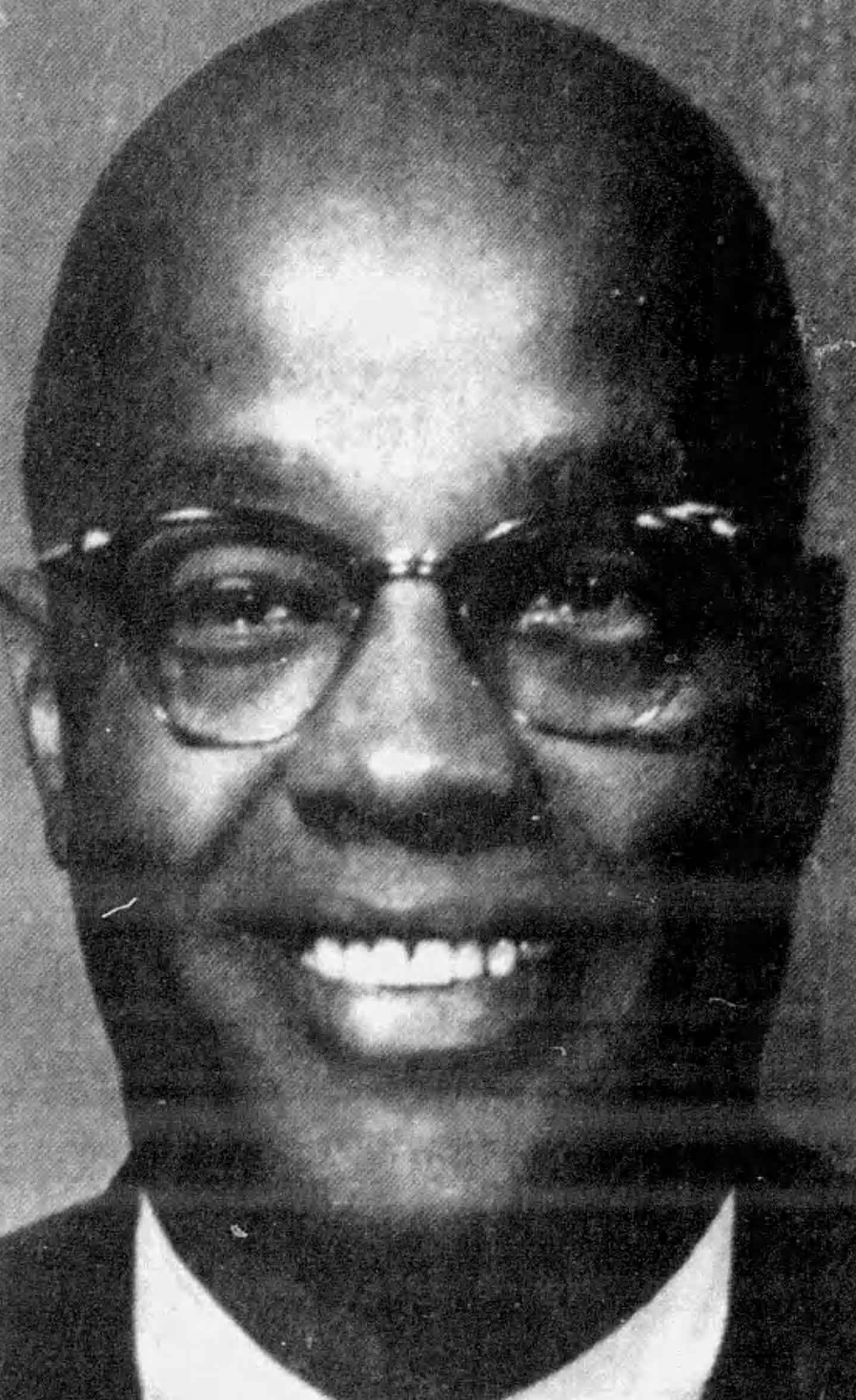
Jones c. 1976

Thomas Russell Jones, Jr. (August 5, 1913 – October 27, 2006) was an African-American member of the New York State Assembly, a justice of the New York Supreme Court, and a leading civil rights activist for black Americans in slums of Northern cities.

== Career ==
Jones graduated from St. John's University and from St. John's University School of Law. He was admitted to the bar in 1938. He worked as an activist in anti-fascism, and in 1941 enlisted in the U.S. Army. As a first lieutenant, he participated in the Normandy invasion in 1944. Upon returning to New York, Jones became chief counsel for the local NAACP branch, mainly involved in cases of police brutality. In 1955, Jones defended three Chinese immigrant workers who had been convicted and sentenced to prison for sedition for "helping Communist China" because they had been sending money home to relatives there. The United States Supreme Court declined to hear their appeal. In 1980, Jones delivered a speech in Beijing about the case and the American legal system.

Jones was a Democratic member of the New York State Assembly (Kings County, 10th District) in 1963 and 1964. In November 1964, he was elected to the New York City Civil Court, and in November 1967 to the New York Supreme Court.

Jones worked with U.S. Senator Robert F. Kennedy in an effort to improve squalor conditions in ghettos and slums in New York. Underestimating Kennedy's genuine desire to help, and mindful that many other outsiders had come to Bedford–Stuyvesant, examined conditions there, then left without doing anything to help, Jones said cynically,

I'm weary of study, Senator. Weary of speeches, weary of promises that aren't kept... The Negro people are angry, Senator, and, judge that I am, I'm angry, too. No one is helping us.

Jones became the first president of Kennedy's bipartisan grassroots community effort, one of two restoration companies (one for community leaders and one for businessmen) that Kennedy helped found for Bedford–Stuyvesant. The objective was to build health clinics, redevelop housing, build parks and playgrounds, spur commercial activity and investment, and increase employment and political participation amongst the residents. In 1967, Jones helped found the Bedford Stuyvesant Restoration Corporation, which grew out of the initial Kennedy effort. The assassination of Kennedy devastated Jones, and it led him to focus more on his judicial career instead of community rebuilding.

Jones retired from the bench in 1985.

== Personal life ==
Jones was born on August 5, 1913, in Brooklyn, New York City, the son of Thomas Russell Jones, Sr. and Mabel (Ward) Jones, immigrants from Barbados. In 1941, he married his wife, Bertha K. Jones, with whom he had a son, David, and a daughter, Margaret. Jones died on October 27, 2006, of prostate cancer, survived by his wife, son and daughter, and five grandchildren.

== In other media ==
Jones was portrayed by actor Ving Rhames in the 2002 TV movie RFK.

New York State Assembly
Preceded by Samuel I. Berman	New York State Assembly; Kings County, 17th District; 1963–1964	Succeeded by Shirley Chisholm
