= Community development corporation =

Type of corporation typically operating for the benefit of a local area's public

A Community Development Corporation (CDC) is a not-for-profit organization incorporated to provide programs, offer services and engage in other activities that promote and support community development. CDCs usually serve a geographic location such as a neighborhood or a town. They often focus on serving lower-income residents or struggling neighborhoods. They can be involved in a variety of activities including economic development, education, community organizing and real estate development. These organizations are often associated with the development of affordable housing.

The first community development corporation in the United States was the Bedford Stuyvesant Restoration Corporation.

== HUD / Federal Official Definition of a Community Development Corporation ==
HUD’s Section 4 Capacity Building program provides one of the clearest Federal definitions of a CDC. This is the official Federal program definition used to determine eligibility for Section 4 grants. Under that definition, a CDC must:

- Be a nonprofit organization organized under Federal, State, or local law to engage in community development activities (including housing and economic development) primarily within an identified geographic area of operation;
- Be governed by a board composed of community residents, business, and civic leaders;
- Have as its primary purpose the improvement of the physical, economic, or social environment of that area, especially for low-income populations;
- Be independent from profit-minded control;
- Have IRS tax-exempt status (typically 501(c)(3) or (c)(4)); and
- Meet standards for financial accountability under federal rules.

== National Field / CDC Networks Definition of a Community Development Corporation ==
Nationally, CDCs are nonprofit, community-based, and place-focused. They self-identify as CDCs; there is no separate IRS tax category for CDCs. Board composition that includes community voices is a strong field expectation even if not always codified.

Community Development Corporations are typically described in field literature as neighborhood-level, nonprofit organizations that implement community development projects—often including affordable housing, community centers, job training, and services—in the low-income communities they serve. They typically operate with professional staff and board oversight that includes neighborhood residents, even though there is no formal national certification category separate from 501(c)(3).

National surveys and field networks like the National Alliance of Community Economic Development Associations (NACEDA, now the Community Opportunity Alliance), a network of nearly 6,000 community development organizations engaged in affordable housing, small business development, commercial space development, and community services in underserved communities) describe CDCs as organizations that aggregate resources, ideas, and actors to improve a place for the benefit of its residents.

== Philanthropy / Field-Oriented Definitions ==
Build Healthy Places Network defines CDCs in ways that highlight place-based impact and community leadership:

- CDCs are described as neighborhood-based nonprofit organizations that carry out community development projects in low-income communities. They are described as capacity builders and intermediaries, connecting residents, service providers, government, and investors to implement development and community improvement work.
- Philanthropic literature consistently characterizes CDCs as nonprofits focused on revitalization with community accountability and place focus.

== Activities ==
- Real estate development
  - Affordable housing
- Economic development
  - Small business lending
  - Small business technical assistance
  - Small business incubation (i.e. provision of space at low or no cost to start-up businesses)
- Education
  - Early childhood education
  - Workforce training
- Nonprofit incubation
  - Fundraising for local causes as a corporate donor, public charity, or foundation
  - Financing Housing cooperatives or other cooperatives
  - Fiscal sponsorship of community-based associations
- Youth and leadership development
- Advocacy
  - Sustainable development advocacy
  - Locally-owned business advocacy
  - Environmental justice and brownfields redevelopment
- Community planning
  - Master planning for retail and community development
- Community organizing
  - Lessening neighborhood tensions
  - Facilitating community and stakeholder participation in local programs and activities
  - Facilitating community access to targeted grants

In some jurisdictions in the United States, a CDC is by definition targeted towards direct investment in the community, while a "community development advocacy organization" is a category eligible for recognition as a tax-exempt charity or service organization.

== Notable examples ==
- Abyssinian Development Corporation
- Accion USA
- Bedford Stuyvesant Restoration Corporation
- Community Development Corporation of Oregon
- Chicanos Por La Causa
- Mexicantown Community Development Corporation
- Coalfield Development Corporation
- Sunshine State Economic Development Corporation
- Youngstown Neighborhood Development Corporation
- Tenderloin Neighborhood Development Corporation

== Bibliography ==
- Florence Contant (1974), Community development corporations: an annotated bibliography, Exchange Bibliography, US: Council of Planning Librarians, ISSN 0010-9959 – via Internet Archive
