= Bedford Stuyvesant Restoration Corporation =

Community development corporation based in Brooklyn, New York, U.S.

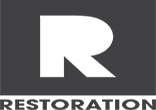
- Founded: April 1, 1967; 59 years ago
- Founders: Robert F. Kennedy, John Lindsay, Jacob Javits, and Thomas R. Jones
- Type: Community development corporation (IRS exemption status): 501(c)(3)
- Location: New York City, New York, United States
- Region served: Brooklyn, New York City
- Key people: President - Colvin W. Grannum; Chairman - Kevin Chavers
- Revenue: $11,893,358 (2016)
- Expenses: $11,018,008 (2016)
- Website: RestorationPlaza.org

The Bedford Stuyvesant Restoration Corporation (or BSRC, referred to locally in short as Restoration) is a community development corporation based in Brooklyn, New York, and the first ever to be established in the United States.

== Background ==
=== Decline of Bedford–Stuyvesant ===
In the late 19th century and the early 20th century, the neighborhood of Bedford–Stuyvesant in Brooklyn, New York, was home to middle class German, Dutch, Italian, Irish, and Jewish immigrants and their descendants. In the 1920s, African-Americans migrating from the South settled in the area. Starting in 1930, people from Harlem moved into the neighborhood, seeking better housing. As the impoverished black population increased, banks reduced lending to local residents and businesses. By 1950, the number of blacks had risen to 155,000, comprising about 55 percent of the population of Bedford–Stuyvesant. Over the next decade, real estate agents and speculators employed blockbusting to make quick profits. As a result, formerly middle-class white homes were turned over to poorer black families. By 1960, eighty-five percent of the population was black.

By the mid-1960s, 450,000 residents occupied the neighborhood's nine square miles. Bedford–Stuyvesant had become Brooklyn's most populous neighborhood and had the second largest concentration of African-Americans in the United States. Garbage pickup decreased and local schools deteriorated. The streets became dangerous as juvenile delinquency, gang activity, and heroin use increased. Around 80 percent of residents were high school dropouts and about 36 percent of children were born to unmarried mothers. Economic downturn was in part facilitated by the decline of the Brooklyn Navy Yard and the closure of a Sheffield Farms milk-bottling plant on Fulton Street. Almost half of the housing was officially classified as "dilapidated and insufficient." Rates of venereal disease were among the highest in the United States, while infant mortality was the highest.

=== 1964 riot and reaction ===
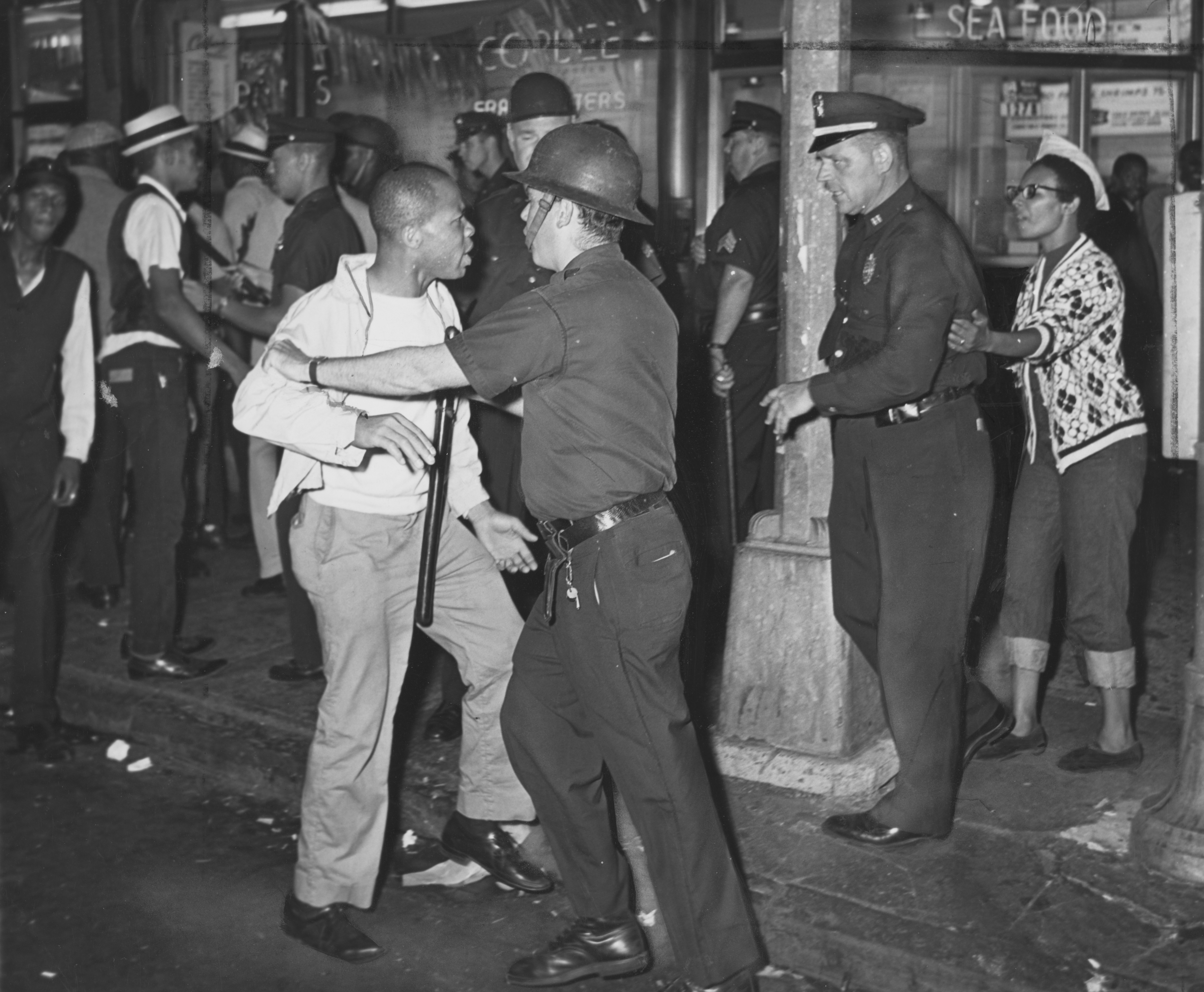
Confrontation between black rioters and police at Fulton Street and Nostrand Avenue during the 1964 riot

On July 16, 1964, an off-duty white police lieutenant, Thomas Gilligan, shot and killed a 15-year old black boy, James Powell. Two nights later, violence broke out in Harlem, and on July 20 rioting started at the intersection of Fulton Street and Nostrand Avenue in Bedford–Stuyvesant. This carried on for three nights in the latter neighborhood and resulted in 276 arrests, 22 injuries, and 556 incidents of property damage which cost an estimated $350,000. The riot brought national attention to Bedford–Stuyvesant, but concern soon faded; after six months, the only improvement in the community was the paving of an empty lot.

On November 21, the Central Brooklyn Coordinating Council hosted an all-day conference at Pratt Institute in response to the summer riot. 600 local civic, religious, and political leaders discussed ways to improve the area. In the end it was decided that the Pratt Institute's Planning Department would conduct a six-month survey of local challenges and the potential for redevelopment. The study focused on a 12-block section of the community, finding much of the housing in the area at the point of decay. However, it was found that chances of rehabilitation in the area were "greatly enhanced" by the fact that 22.5 percent of buildings were owner occupied, 9.7 percent of buildings were owned by individuals that lived close by, and the average homeowner resided in the area for 15 years. The Planning Department's report concluded that New York City should "mobilize all necessary antipoverty and other social welfare and educational programs" to save the neighborhood from further decline. However, Youth-in-Action, the community's city anti-poverty agency, was only allocated $440,000 out of a requested $2.6 million budget for 1965, forcing it to cut many of its programs.

=== Robert F. Kennedy's involvement ===
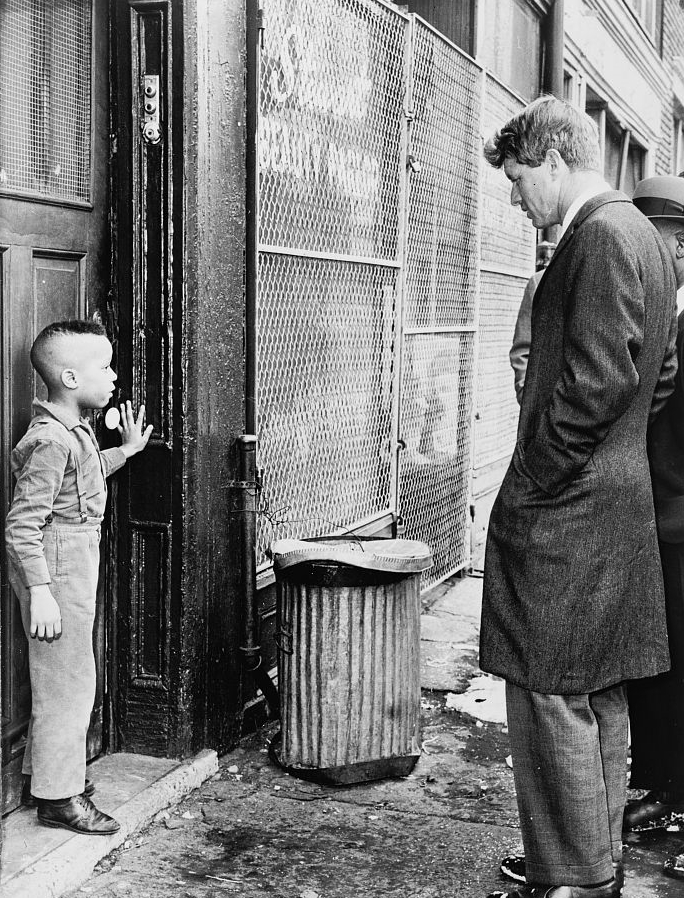
Senator Robert F. Kennedy speaks with a boy during his tour of Bedford–Stuyvesant

Late in 1965 Robert F. Kennedy, the junior senator of New York, decided to give an address on race and poverty. Disturbed by the Watts riots in Los Angeles, he was worried that America's racial crisis was shifting from the rural South to the urban North. He was also concerned that white support for black demands within the community was declining and that race relations were near to boiling over.

Kennedy gave three consecutive speeches in Manhattan on January 20, 21, and 22, 1966. Most of the content was in line with John F. Kennedy's New Frontier programs, with proposals for job training, rent subsidies, students loans for the poor, and housing desegregation. He also broke with President Lyndon B. Johnson's Great Society rhetorical optimism, arguing that the situation for black Americans was worsening instead of improving. He asserted that welfare and stricter code enforcement were not solving the problems facing ghettos and that community involvement and action from the private sector were necessary to effectively combat urban poverty. Kennedy warned that failure to act could lead to more race riots. Several days later, Kennedy decided to create his own anti-poverty program. He told speechwriter Adam Walinsky, "I want to do something about all this. Some kind of project that goes after some of these problems[...]see what you can put together."

In mid-February, Kennedy spent an afternoon touring Bedford–Stuyvesant, led by CBCC member Elsie Richardson. Afterwards, he attended a meeting with community activists at the local YMCA building. Similar in manner to the Baldwin–Kennedy meeting of 1963, Brooklyn community leaders were bitter towards the senator and lectured him on the problems black residents of the neighborhood faced. Civil Court Judge Thomas R. Jones said, "I'm weary of study, Senator. Weary of speeches, weary of promises that aren't kept[...]The Negro people are angry, Senator, and, judge that I am, I'm angry, too. No one is helping us."

== History ==
=== Planning and design ===
Throughout the summer of 1966 Senator Kennedy's aides, Walinsky and Thomas Johnston, planned an anti-poverty program. As part of their research, they traveled across the country to consult black militants, urban theorists, federal administrators, journalists, mayors, foundation leaders, and banking and business executives. Johnston spent much of his time in Bedford–Stuyvesant trying to sort out differences between the community's middle-class leadership. Earl G. Graves, Sr., a former real-estate broker from the area, was brought in to assist him. Realizing that the Johnson administration and Brooklyn's white Democrats felt politically threatened by his project, Kennedy secured support from Mayor John Lindsay and the senior senator from New York, Jacob Javits, both Republicans. He also earned corporate support from Thomas Watson Jr. of IBM, William S. Paley of CBS, investment banker André Meyer, and former Secretary of Treasury C. Douglas Dillon. Only David Rockefeller declined to support the project.

By October, Kennedy, his staff, and community leaders had resolved to launch a community development corporation for the near-entirety of the ghetto of Bedford–Stuyvesant. Kennedy later said, "An effort in one problem area is almost worthless. A program for housing, without simultaneous programs for jobs, education, welfare reform, health, and economic development cannot succeed. The whole community must be involved as a whole." Initial plans included coordinated programs for the creation of jobs, housing renovation and rehabilitation, improved health sanitation, and recreation facilities, the construction of two "super blocks," the conversion of the abandoned Sheffield Farms milk-bottling plant into a town hall and community center, a mortgage consortium to provide subsidized loans for homeowners, the founding of a private work-study community college for dropouts, and a public campaign to convince corporations to invest in industry in the neighborhood.

A few days before the project was going to be publicly unveiled, Kennedy said "I'm not at all sure this is going to work. But it's going to test some new ideas, some new ways of doing this, that are different from the government's. Even if we fail, we'll have learned something. But more important than that, something has to be done. People like myself can't go around making nice speeches all the time. We can't just keep raising expectations. We have to do some damn hard work, too."

=== First founding ===
On December 9, 1966, Kennedy, together with Mayor Lindsay and Senator Javits, announced his anti-poverty program at New York Public School 305. He told the audience, "The program for the development of Bedford–Stuyvesant will combine the best of community action with the best of the private enterprise system. Neither by itself is enough, but in their combination lies our hope for the future." The plan was met with mixed reactions in the press, with some liberals accusing the project of relying too heavily on the private sector while conservative elements were more hopeful of its chances for success.

Initially, the responsibility of the revival of the neighborhood rested with two private, nonprofit corporations. The first, Bedford–Stuyvesant Renewal and Rehabilitation Corporation (R & R), consisted of 20 established civic and religious community leaders under the leadership of Judge Thomas R. Jones. Its purpose was to design anti-poverty programs and retain basic decision-making authority. The second, Distribution and Services (D & R), was to secure financial and logistical support for the former. It was run by an all-white board of businessmen that included Watson, Paley, Meyer, Dillon, David Lilienthal and Jacob Merrill Kaplan. Roswell Gilpatric, James Oates, and Benno C. Schmidt Sr. were later added.

=== Internal disputes and second founding ===
The community corporation's membership was almost entirely middle class and about one-third female. Many factions in Bedford–Stuyvesant felt underrepresented, resulting in bitter political infighting. In March 1967 Judge Jones reached an impasse with the Central Brooklyn Coordinating Council. With the support of Kennedy and Lindsay, he demanded that the R & R board resolve to expand itself to include a wider array of community leaders and give him three weeks to revise the corporation's structure. The ultimatum lost by a single vote and Jones angrily resigned.

The ensuing dispute threatened to derail the entire project. Kennedy tried to salvage it by dissolving the R & R and creating a new restoration corporation. Arguing that a more representative group was needed to secure federal and private grants, he won the support of Lindsay and Javits to proceed. On April 1, Jones announced the formation of the Bedford Stuyvesant Restoration Corporation (BSRC). It was the first community development corporation in the United States. The new board included Sonny Carson, Albert Vann, and Milton Galamison. Franklin A. Thomas selected to be the first President and CEO of the new corporation.

=== Initial activities ===
The corporations received their first grants from the Stern Family Fund, J. M. Kaplan Fund, Ford Foundation and Astor Foundation. Seven months later they received a $7 million grant from the Department of Labor made possible by a 1966 amendment to the Economic Opportunity Act of 1964 drafted by Kennedy and Javits to provide the private sector with incentive payments in exchange for investments in impoverished areas. In spite of a public awareness campaign and support from several prominent Republicans, the project only received modest support from private businesses. Investments from IBM, Xerox, and U.S. Gypsum notwithstanding, most corporate executives believed there was little profit in poorer communities and were concerned about hostile working environments. Most of the residents of Bedford–Stuyvesant were initially skeptical of the project's intentions.

Planning occurred throughout the early months of 1967. By March, a strategy had been laid out for the physical reconstruction and rehabilitation of Bedford–Stuyvesant. It centered around a two-block-wide commercial zone to be located between Fulton Street and Atlantic Avenue which would serve as a principal point for local business and community organizations. Several lightly trafficked roads were chosen to be transformed into landscaped walkways. Architect I. M. Pei was commissioned for the establishment of the two "superblocks". Local residents believed the proposal was purely cosmetic and insisted that housing and employment programs be given greater attention. Pei was eventually able to convince more of the corporation's staff to support his plan.

Meanwhile, members of the still-functional D & S board were working on areas of their expertise; Paley began exploring the development of communications infrastructure, George S. Moore focused on project financing and mortgage pooling, Schmidt assisted small businesses, Watson managed job training and employment programs, and Meyer worked on real estate problems and strategized for the corporation's overall funding. Wanting to earn the trust of the community, Thomas organized the "Community Home Improvement Program" (CHIP). With labor drawn from unemployed youth, various houses would be chosen by lottery to have their exteriors refurbished. In turn, homeowners would provide a token payment of $25 (for work valued at $325). The corporation would continue to maintain the houses after rehabilitation. Though seen by Judge Jones as "superficial", the program went into effect with a $500,000 federal grant and quickly became popular. The D & S board gradually began to lose its supremacy over the BSRC. Thomas lobbied for an end of D & S control over funding and created a joint account to be managed by both corporations. In December 1967 Kennedy brought in John Doar to be the new executive director of the D & S board. One of his first actions was to relocate the businessmen corporation's staff into the BSRC's offices. It was seen by community leaders as a hindrance and eventually dissolved.

The BSRC also produced a television series about the neighborhood, Inside Bedford-Stuyvesant, which premiered in April 1968. By December, the Bedford Stuyvesant Restoration Corporation had restored 400 brownstones and tenements with the help of 272 local residents, 250 of whom were later hired in full-time construction jobs. Two "Neighborhood Restoration Centers" for free advice and legal consultation had been opened, 14 new black-owned businesses had been established, and 1,200 residents had received vocational training. IBM located a computer cable plant in the neighborhood, creating 300 new jobs, while the City University of New York had agreed to coordinate with community leaders for the construction of a new community college in the area. A mortgage pool fund run by a consortium of 65 banks loaned $1.5 million to homeowners. Still, progress was slow and journalist Jack Newfield estimated that of Bedford–Stuyvesant's 450,000 inhabitants, only about 25,000 had been affected by the corporation's work.

In 1968 the BSRC purchased the abandoned milk-bottling plant on Fulton street for rehabilitation. Its restoration was completed in 1972 and it became the new corporate headquarters for the BSRC, entitled Restoration Plaza. In 1979, Pathmark opened the first supermarket in Bedford-Stuyvesant in the plaza.

In 1971, the BSRC looked to stimulate the region's economy through employment, education, and healthcare programming. This included a textile project by the Design Works of Bedford-Stuyvesant, founded by Jacqueline Kennedy Onassis, shown at a gala event at the Metropolitan Museum of Art.

=== 21st century ===
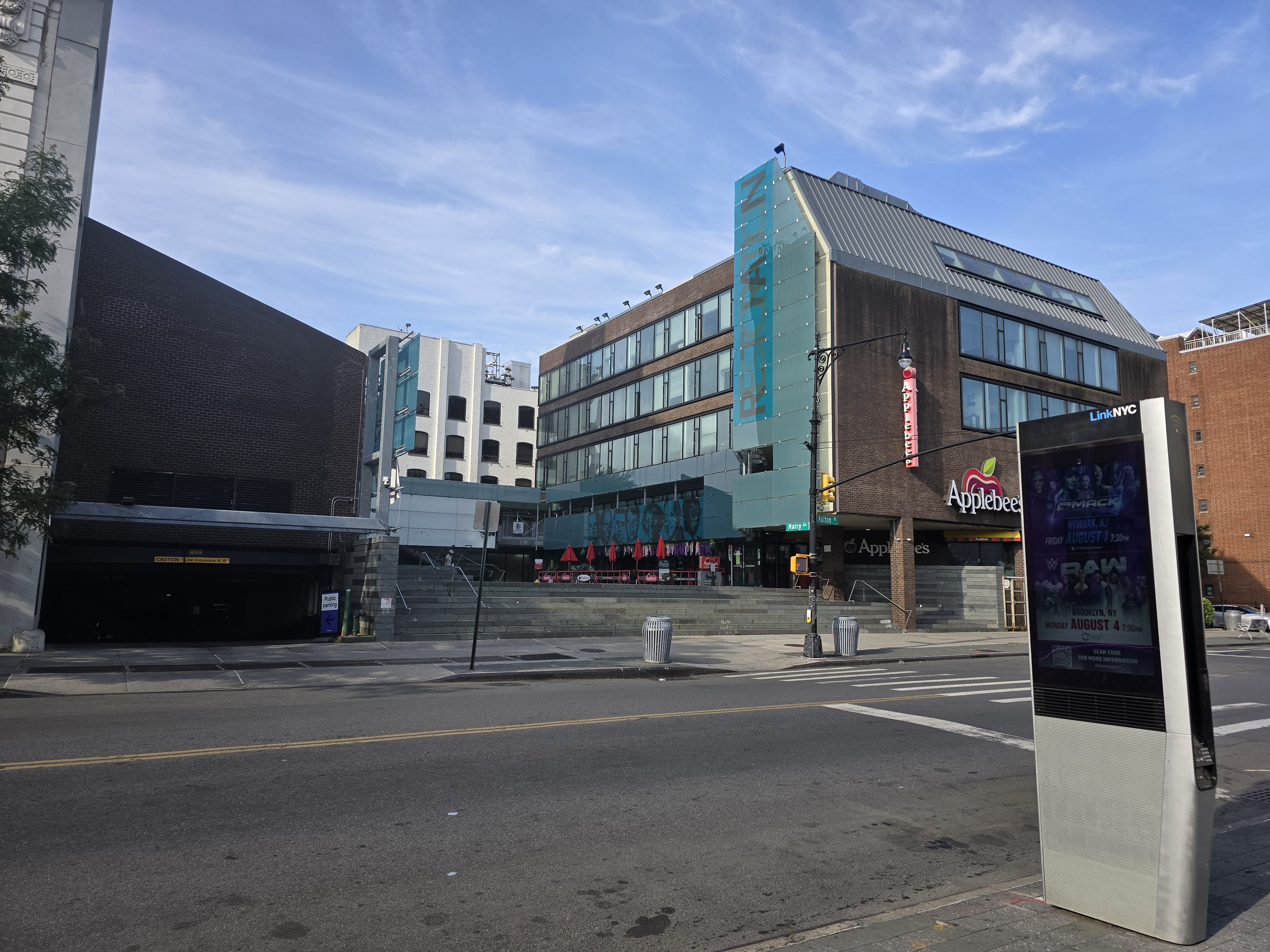
Restoration Plaza in Bed-Stuy

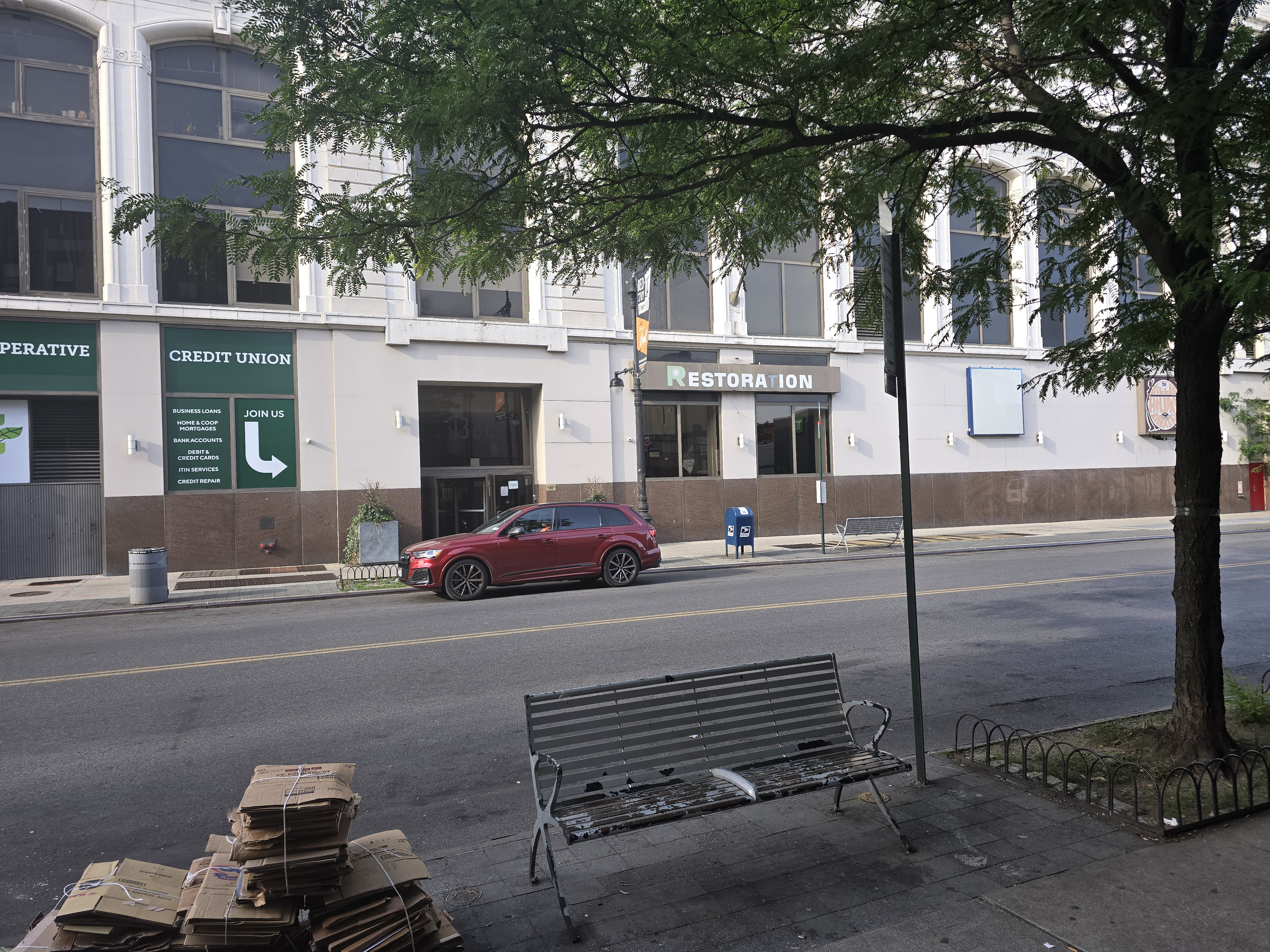
The entrance to Restoration

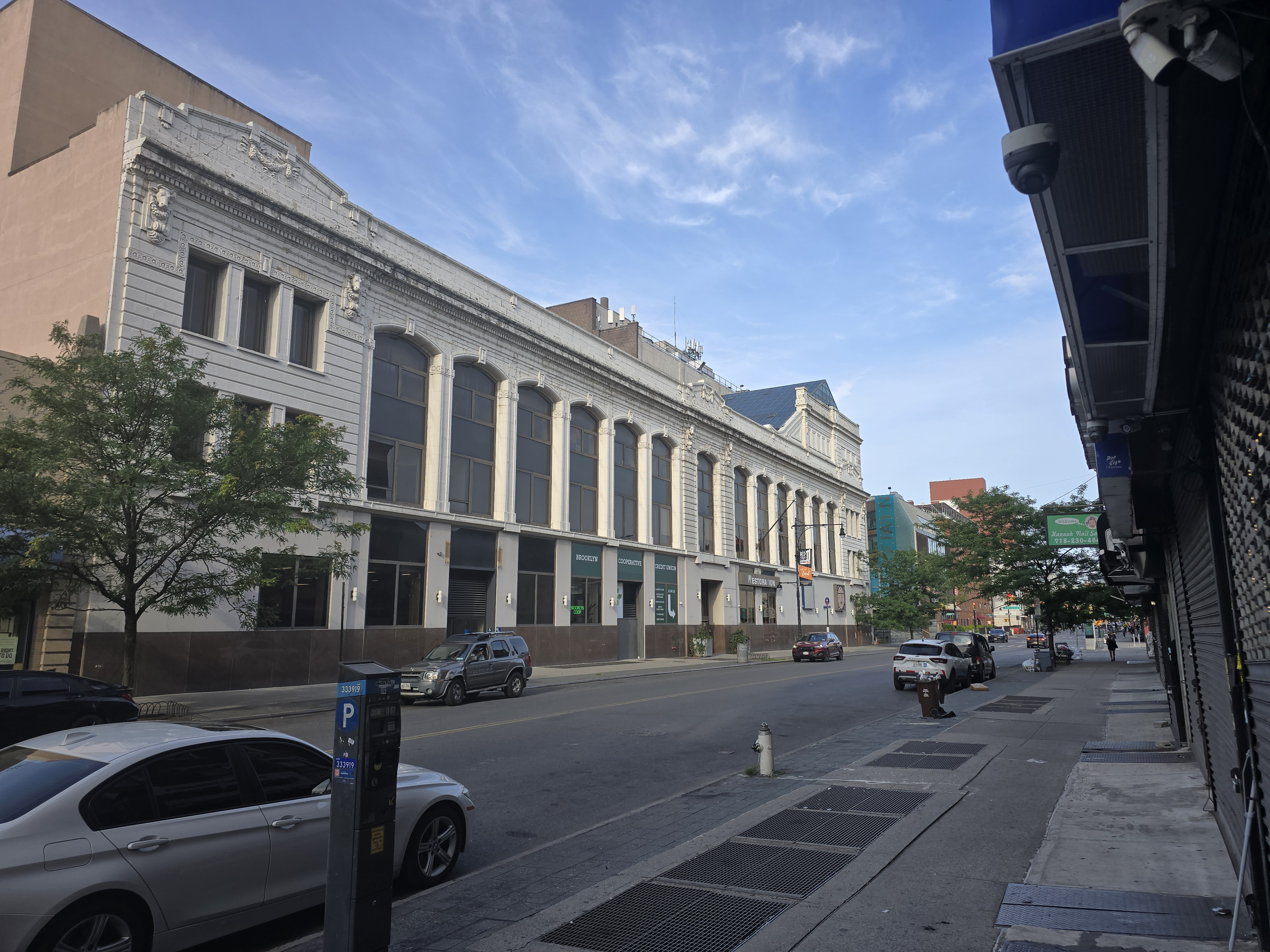
A large building restored by Restoration

As of 2010, Bedford Stuyvesant Restoration Corporation had constructed or rehabilitated 2200 housing units in the neighborhood, provided mortgage financing to nearly 1500 homeowners, brought $375 million in investments to the community, and created over 20,000 jobs.

Restoration Plaza currently serves as an office and mall complex for the surrounding area and as the unofficial downtown of Bedford–Stuyvesant. In addition to housing utilities services and a post office, the building hosts the BSRC's Center for Arts and Culture. This includes the Billie Holiday Theatre, Restoration Dance Theater, and the Skylight Art Gallery. The Youth Arts Academy, Under One Sun, and Phat Tuesday programs are also run from the plaza. In 2023 the architect David Adjaye unveiled the design the addition of 600,000 square feet of office space, a remodeled public plaza, and an expansion to existing facilities, including the Billie Holiday Theatre.
