= Begushkin =

Begushkin is an American folk rock band from Brooklyn founded by multi-instrumentalist Dan Smith. Band members include Stephanie Rabbins, Stephan Ryskewitch, Cynthia Hopkins and Josh Saltzman. The band share an approach and style to that of Smog, Flannery O'Connor and Will Oldham.

== Discography ==
- 2007 Nightly Things (Locust Music) (2007)
- 2008 Kings Curse (Locust Music) (2008)
- 2017 War Drum (Begushkin) (2017)
