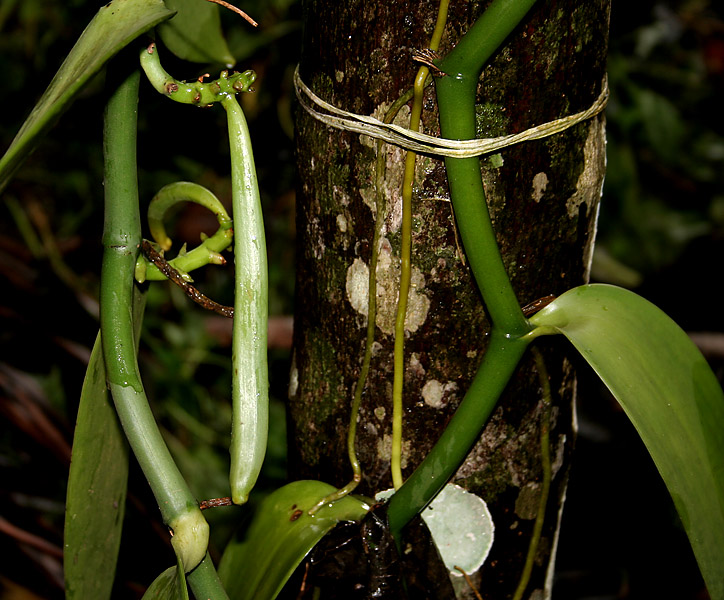
- Flat-leaved vanilla, Tahitian vanilla or West Indian vanilla (Vanilla planifolia Jacks. ex Andrews)

Scientific classification
- Kingdom: Plantae
- Clade: Tracheophytes
- Clade: Angiosperms
- Clade: Monocots
- Order: Asparagales
- Family: Orchidaceae
- Subfamily: Vanilloideae
- Tribe: Vanilleae; Blume Rumphia 1: 196. (1835)

Genera
- Clematepistephium; Cyrtosia; Epistephium; Eriaxis; Erythrorchis; Galeola; Lecanorchis; Pseudovanilla; Vanilla

= Vanilleae =

Tribe of orchids

Vanilleae is an orchid tribe of 9 genera in the subfamily Vanilloideae.

== Classification ==
Tribe Vanilleae

Genus Clematepistephium (1 species) (Endemic to New Caledonia)
- Clematepistephium smilacifolium

Genus Cyrtosia (5 species)
- Cyrtosia integra
- Cyrtosia javanica
- Cyrtosia nana
- Cyrtosia plurialata
- Cyrtosia septentrionalis

Genus Epistephium (21 species)

See all...

Genus Eriaxis (1 species) (Endemic to New Caledonia)
- Eriaxis rigida

Genus Erythrorchis (2 species)
- Erythrorchis altissima
- Erythrorchis cassythoides

Genus Galeola (6 species)
- Galeola cathcarthii
- Galeola faberi
- Galeola falconeri
- Galeola humblotii
- Galeola lindleyana
- Galeola nudifolia

Genus Lecanorchis (21 species) (Endemic to New Caledonia)

See all...

Genus Pseudovanilla (8 species)
- Pseudovanilla affinis
- Pseudovanilla anomala
- Pseudovanilla foliata
- Pseudovanilla gravilis
- Pseudovanilla philippinensis
- Pseudovanilla ponapensis
- Pseudovanilla ternatensis
- Pseudovanilla vanilloides
Genus Vanilla (110 species)

See all...
