= P. foliata =

P. foliata may refer to:

- Peperomia foliata, a radiator plant species in the genus Peperomia
- Pseudovanilla foliata, an orchid species in the genus Pseudovanilla found in New South Wales, Australia
- Pterostylis foliata, an orchid species in the genus Pterostylis

== See also ==
- Foliata (disambiguation)
