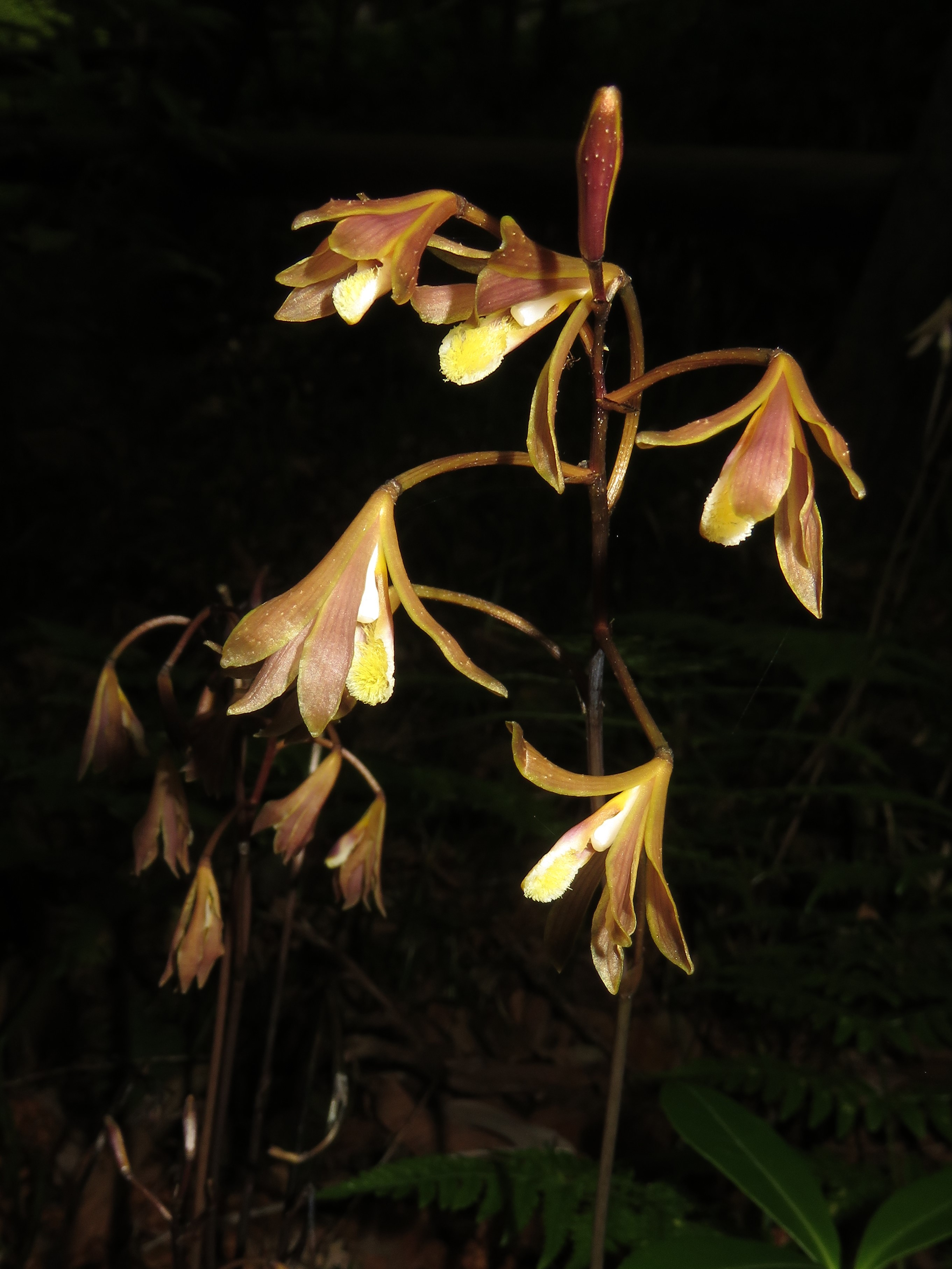
- Lecanorchis japonica

Scientific classification
- Kingdom: Plantae
- Clade: Tracheophytes
- Clade: Angiosperms
- Clade: Monocots
- Order: Asparagales
- Family: Orchidaceae
- Subfamily: Vanilloideae
- Tribe: Vanilleae
- Genus: Lecanorchis; Blume

Type species
- Lecanorchis japonica Blume, Mus. Bot. 2: 188 (1856).

= Lecanorchis =

Genus of orchids

Lecanorchis is a genus of orchids (family Orchidaceae) belonging to the subfamily Vanilloideae.

The scientific name is derived from the Greek words lekane (basin) and orchis (orchid).

They occur in mountain forest of the Himalayas, China, Japan, Korea, Southeast Asia, and New Guinea at altitudes of 300–1,500 metres (980–4,920 ft).

They are terrestrial, leafless myco-heterotrophs (formerly called saprophytes). They produce numerous, long, thick, horizontal roots under a short rhizome. The erect, dark, branched or unbranched stems are thin and brittle. They bear few to many dull brown, purple, yellow or green flowers with a somewhat brighter lip. The lip is about of equal length to the sepals and is covered with dense, yellow hair.

Characteristics for this species are:

- A calyculus, a cup-like structure formed from a group of small bracts, is present.
- The erect gynostemium (the fused stamen and pistil) is elongate.

Lecanorchis is related to Clematepistephium and Eriaxis, both endemic to New Caledonia.

== Species ==
Species accepted as of June 2014:

- Lecanorchis amethystea Y.Sawa, Fukunaga & S.Sawa (2006) (Japan, Taiwan)
- Lecanorchis betongensis Suddee & H.A.Pedersen (2011) (Thailand)
- Lecanorchis bicarinata Schltr. (1922) (New Guinea)
- Lecanorchis brachycarpa Ohwi. (1938) (Ryukyu Islands and Taiwan)
- Lecanorchis ciliolata J.J.Sm. (1929) (New Guinea)
- Lecanorchis flavicans Fukuy. (1942) (Ryukyu Islands)(Status : threatened)
- Lecanorchis japonica Blume (1856) (Japan, Korea, Taiwan, Fujian, Hunan)
- Lecanorchis javanica Blume (1856) (Java, Taiwan, Thailand, Vietnam, Malaysia, Philippines, New Guinea)
- Lecanorchis latens T.P.Lin & W.M.Lin (2011) (Taiwan)
- Lecanorchis kiusiana Tuyama (1955) (Korea, Japan)
- Lecanorchis malaccensis Ridl. (1893) (Thailand, Vietnam, Borneo, Malaysia, Sumatra)
- Lecanorchis multiflora J.J.Sm. (1918) (Thailand, Yunnan, Borneo, Malaysia, Sumatra, Java)
- Lecanorchis neglecta Schltr. (1911) (New Guinea)
- Lecanorchis nigricans Honda (1931) (Japan, Taiwan, Fujian, Thailand, Ryukyu Islands)
- Lecanorchis seidenfadenii Szlach. & Mytnik (2000) (Malaysia)
- Lecanorchis sikkimensis N.Pearce & P.J.Cribb (1999) (Sikkim, Bhutan)
- Lecanorchis subpelorica T.C.Hsu & S.W.Chung, (2010) (Taiwan)
- Lecanorchis suginoana (Tuyama) Seriz. (2005)
- Lecanorchis thalassica T.P.Lin (1987) (Taiwan)
- Lecanorchis vietnamica Aver. (2005), Vietnam
- Lecanorchis virella T.Hashim. (1989) (Japan, Taiwan)

A new species, Lecanorchis tabugawaensis was described in 2016.
