= Lecanorchis tabugawaensis =

Conservation status
- Critically Endangered (IUCN 3.1)

Scientific classification
- Kingdom: Plantae
- Clade: Tracheophytes
- Clade: Angiosperms
- Clade: Monocots
- Order: Asparagales
- Family: Orchidaceae
- Subfamily: Vanilloideae
- Genus: Lecanorchis
- Species: L. tabugawaensis

Binomial name
- Lecanorchis tabugawaensis Suetsugu & Fukunaga

Species of orchid

Lecanorchis tabugawaensis is a species of orchid which belongs to the group of mycoheterotrophic plants. Mycoheterotrophs are known for feeding off of the roots of fungal hosts, instead of utilizing photosynthesis. Myco-heterotrophy refers to the harmonious relationship between particular plants and fungi. After a thorough exploration of the plant's shape, size, and structure, it was determined to be closely associated with orchidaceous Lecanorchis amethystea, although inward variations confirmed this unique species.

The plant was discovered in July 2015 by Yamashita Hiroaki in lowland forests on Yakushima island. This species is only found at two locations along the Tabu River. Other recent discoveries on this island include: Oxygyne yamashitae (2008), Gastrodia uraiensis (2015), and Sciaphila yakushimensis (2016). This island also harbors various scarce plant species such as Lecanorchis virella, Lecanorchis trachycaula, Yakushimense vexillabium, Apostoasia nipponica, Lycopodium sieboldii, and Lysionotus pauciflorus.

== Etymology ==
The name of this plant stems from the Japanese name for the Tabu River, "Tabugawa".

== Description ==
The plant is approximately 20–40 cm long in size. It sprouts between July and August, containing approximately 5 flowers which are about 2–4 cm in size each. The petals are yellowish white with a tint of purple. While at their peak they may become visible, however pairing their small size and limited maturing period, they are rarely seen.

== Significance ==
Lecanorchis tabugawaensis, along with other mycoheterotrophs, are claimed to be a valuable part of the ecosystem. Such plants that survive without direct or high levels of sunlight could potentially have future research and practical implements.

== Conservation ==
The population of L. tabugawaensis contains less than 50 mature plants, and are not known from any other locality. Therefore, L. tabugawaensis is classified as CR under Criterion D1 (IUCN 2014). The island where the plant was discovered contains vast cedar forests and no restrictions on logging, this area is also not currently protected. The excessive logging in surrounding areas is threatening these plants and the entire fungal network.

== Ecology ==
Certain plants, including L. tabugawaensis, no longer rely on insects for pollination, these plants have evolved to self-pollination.
