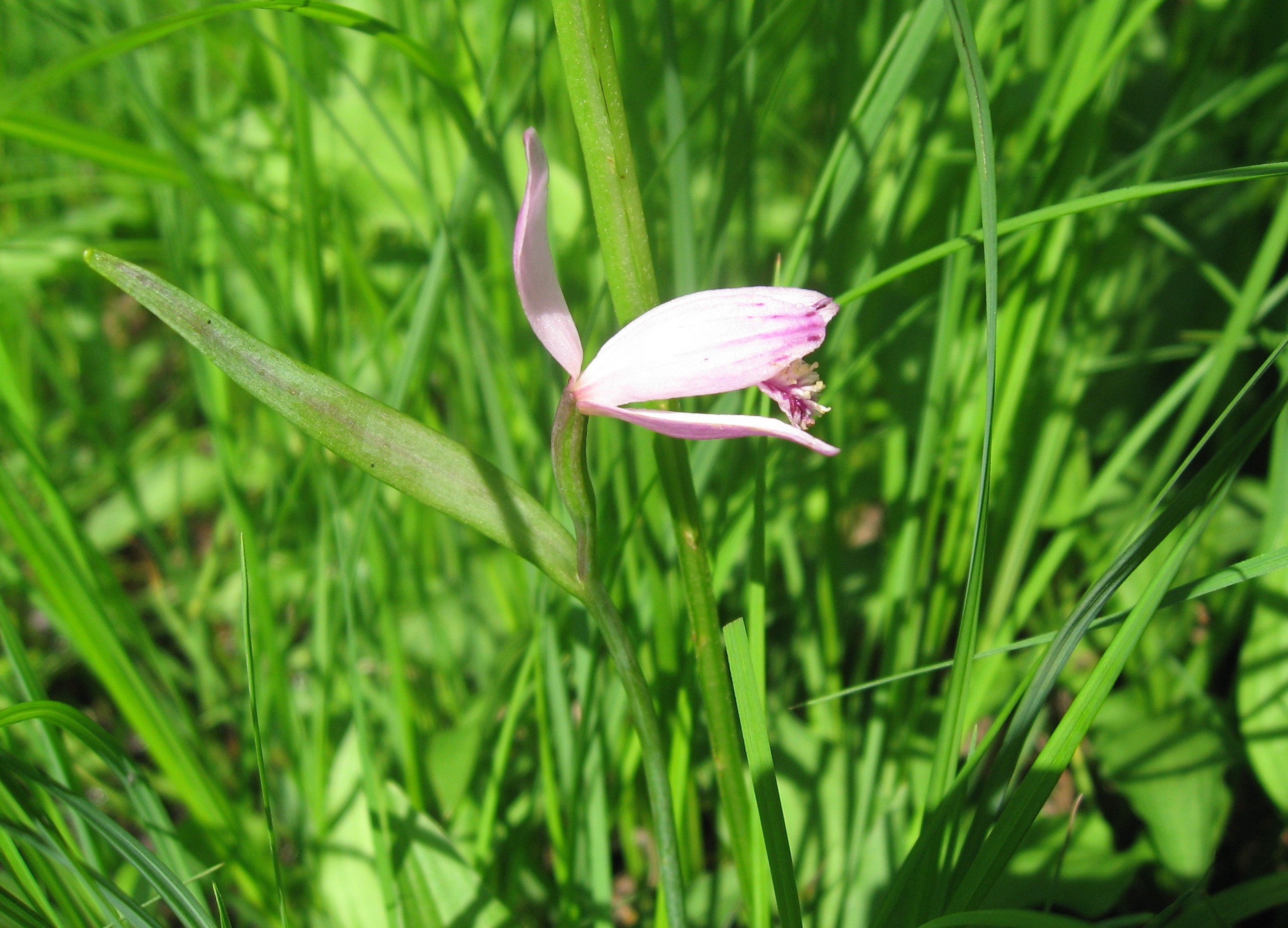
- Flower of Pogonia japonica

Scientific classification
- Kingdom: Plantae
- Clade: Tracheophytes
- Clade: Angiosperms
- Clade: Monocots
- Order: Asparagales
- Family: Orchidaceae
- Subfamily: Vanilloideae
- Genus: Pogonia
- Species: P. japonica

Binomial name
- Pogonia japonica Rchb.f.

Synonyms
- Pogonia similis Blume; Pogonia ophioglossoides var. japonica (Rchb.f.) Finet; Pogonia japonica f. lineariperiantha Satomi & T.Ohsawa; Pogonia minor

= Pogonia japonica =

Species of plant

Pogonia japonica, known as Asian pogonia, is a species of orchid occurring in East Asia.

The orchid is native to Japan, Korea, and China in the provinces of Anhui, Fujian, Guangxi, Guizhou, Heilongjiang, Hubei, Hunan, Jiangxi, Jilin, Inner Mongolia, Shandong, Sichuan, Yunnan, and Zhejiang.

It is found in grasslands on hilltops, forest edges along valleys, moist thickets, and open moist places. It grows from 1,100–2,300 metres (3,600–7,500 ft) in elevation.
