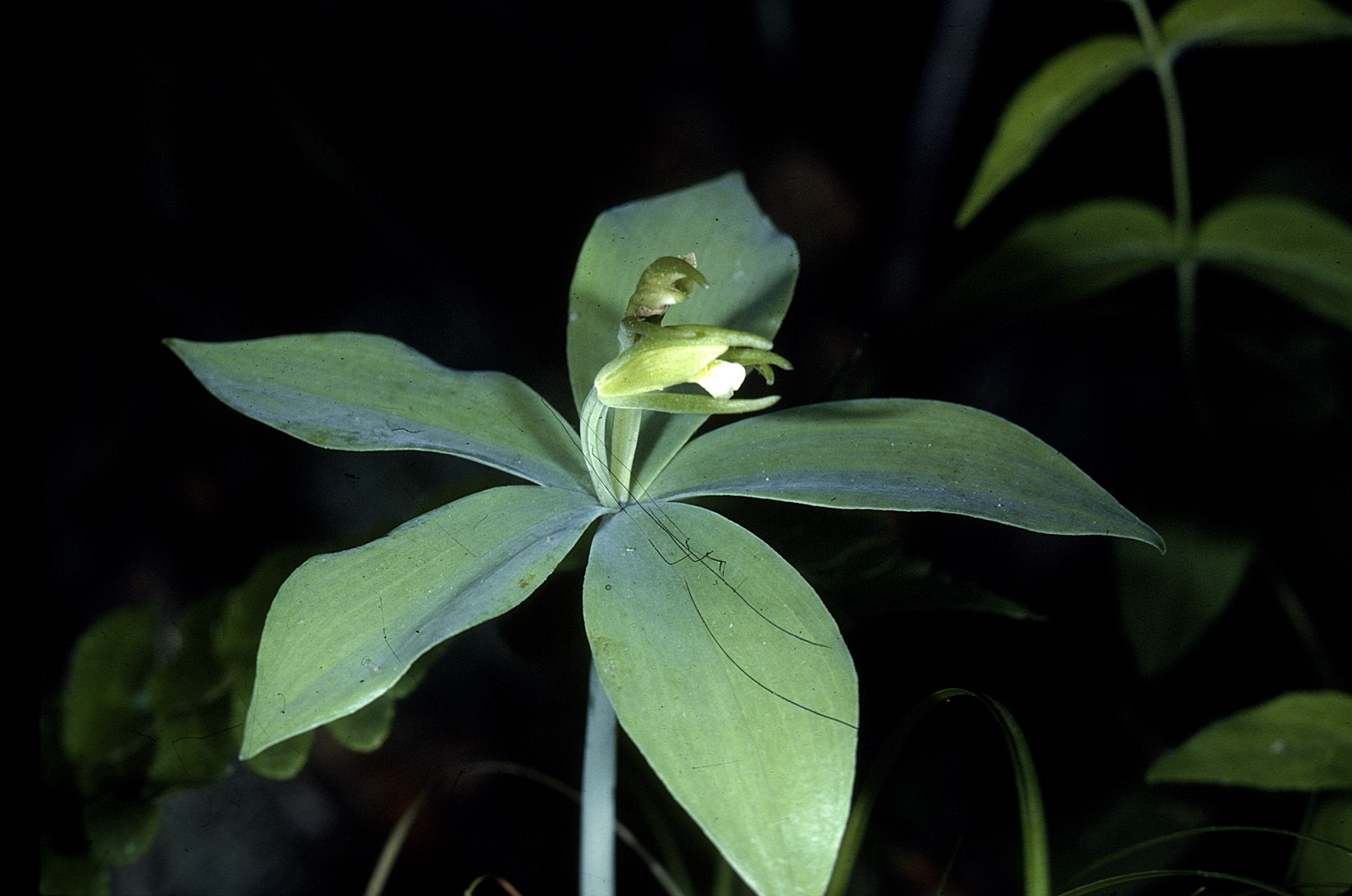

Conservation status
- Vulnerable (IUCN 3.1)

- Threatened (ESA)

Scientific classification
- Kingdom: Plantae
- Clade: Embryophytes
- Clade: Tracheophytes
- Clade: Spermatophytes
- Clade: Angiosperms
- Clade: Monocots
- Order: Asparagales
- Family: Orchidaceae
- Subfamily: Vanilloideae
- Genus: Isotria
- Species: I. medeoloides

Binomial name
- Isotria medeoloides (Pursh) Raf.

= Isotria medeoloides =

Species of orchid

Isotria medeoloides, commonly known as small whorled pogonia or little five leaves, is a terrestrial orchid found in temperate Eastern North America.

== Distribution ==
The orchid's range is from southern Maine south to Georgia and west to southern Ontario, Michigan, and Tennessee. A population was found in Missouri in 1897, but the plant is no longer believed extant there.

It has always been considered a rare species, often legendarily so. It has been called "the rarest orchid east of the Mississippi", and findings of it are covered by the media, such as the one found in Vermont in 2022.

The plant's habitat includes hardwood and conifer-hardwood forests, where it is found in leaf litter along small "braided" intermittent streams. Its native range includes the Appalachian Mountains and Great Lakes region.

== Description ==
Isotria medeoloides is a rhizomatous herb producing a waxy gray-green stem up to about 25 centimeters tall. The gray-green leaves are up to 8.5 centimeters long by 4 wide and are borne in a characteristic whorl.

The flower has green and green-streaked yellowish petals measuring between 1 and 2 centimeters long.

== Conservation ==
The plant is listed as a threatened species by the U.S. Fish and Wildlife Service, having been downlisted from endangered status in 1994 as more populations were discovered, and several were given protection. It is listed as an endangered species by most states or provinces within its range. There are about 104 populations known to exist, but most of these are small, containing fewer than 25 plants.

The main threat to the species' existence is the destruction of its habitat. Other threats include wild pigs, off-road vehicles, predation by deer and slugs, vandalism, and collection.

== Taxonomy ==
This orchid is sometimes confused with the common Indian cucumber (Medeola virginiana), which has similar whorled leaves and grows in similar habitat types. The species name medeoloides is a reference to this similarity.

Anecdotal tales of the species only appearing at decades-long intervals do not appear to be supported by field studies. The plant can usually remain dormant for up to three years.

== Notes ==
=== References ===
- Gleason, H.A. and A. Cronquist. 1991. Manual of Vascular Plants of Northeastern United States and Adjacent Canada. New York Botanical Garden, Bronx, New York.
- Radis, R.P. 1983. Endangered, Threatened, Vulnerable, and Rare Vascular Plant Species of the Delaware Water Gap National Recreation Area. U.S. Department of the Interior, National Park Service, Philadelphia, Pennsylvania.
