= Cyrtosia taiwanica =

Scientific classification
- Kingdom: Plantae
- Clade: Tracheophytes
- Clade: Angiosperms
- Clade: Monocots
- Order: Asparagales
- Family: Orchidaceae
- Subfamily: Vanilloideae
- Genus: Cyrtosia
- Species: C. taiwanica

Binomial name
- Cyrtosia taiwanica K.H.Wang & T.P.Lin

Species of orchid

Cyrtosia taiwanica is a holo-mycoheterotrophic rhizomatous plant that lives in the bamboo forests in central Taiwan. It generally reaches 5 cm (2.0 in) tall, and was once confused with Cyrtosia javanica due to similar flower gross morphologies, despite being different plants and having vastly different vegetative parts.

It was described in 2019 by botanists K.H. Wang and T.P. Lin.
