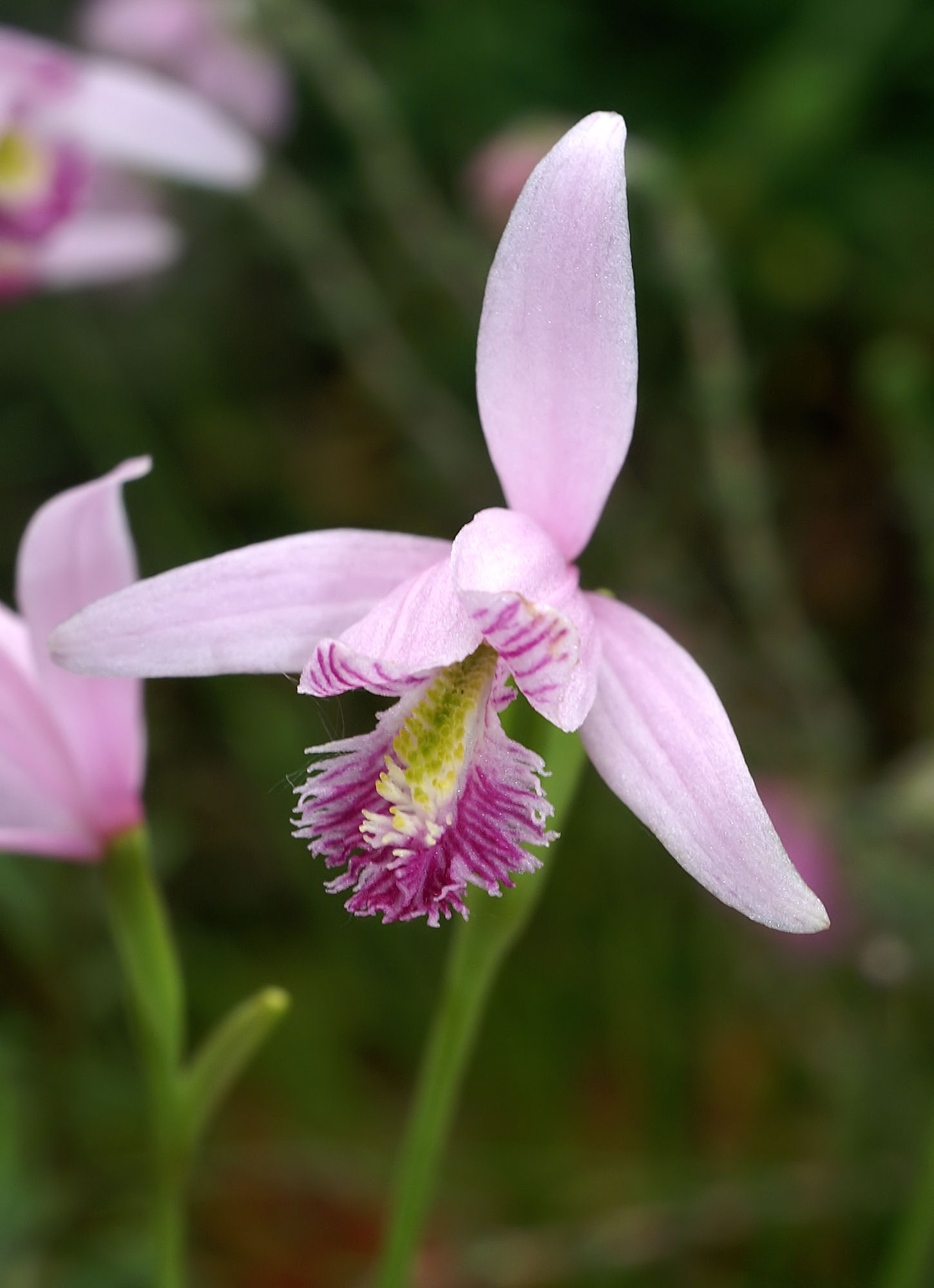
- Flower of Pogonia ophioglossoides

Conservation status
- Least Concern (IUCN 3.1)

Scientific classification
- Kingdom: Plantae
- Clade: Tracheophytes
- Clade: Angiosperms
- Clade: Monocots
- Order: Asparagales
- Family: Orchidaceae
- Subfamily: Vanilloideae
- Genus: Pogonia
- Species: P. ophioglossoides

Binomial name
- Pogonia ophioglossoides (L.) Ker Gawl.

Synonyms
- Arethusa ophioglossoides L. (basionym); Arethusa parviflora Michx.; Pogonia pendula Lindl.

= Pogonia ophioglossoides =

Species of orchid

Pogonia ophioglossoides, also known the snakemouth orchid, adder's tongue or rose pogonia, is a species of orchid occurring from central Canada to the east-central and eastern United States. This species occurs in wet habitats. It is the type species of the genus Pogonia, and is the only species of its genus native to North America.

== Description ==
Rose pogonia is a terrestrial orchid species that typically grows between 8-70cm. Specific attributes, however, are variable depending on the environmental conditions in which they grow.

=== Flowers ===
The flowers of rose pogonia exhibit colour polymorphism, and may range from a pale to dark pink, and occasionally white. Typically one solitary flower (rarely two or three) is borne on a single stem which arises from a rosette of fleshy basal leaves. Bloom times typically last for a long period from June to August, which is prolonged due to the staggered flowering times of individual plants in a given colony. The flowers are composed of a leafy bract, three pink sepals, and three pink petals, including a fringed labellum from which the name snakemouth orchid is derived.

=== Fruit ===
Rose pogonia orchids produce a ribbed capsule 2 centimetres long.

=== Leaves ===
Fleshy leaves are oblong, 2-12cm long, and occur at the base of the plant, somewhat clasping the flowering stem.

== Habitat ==
Colonies of rose pogonia are found growing in wet habitats with acidic soils often containing sphagnum moss. These may include bogs, fens, marshes, and meadows. In the north, the habitat is typically fens but sometimes also bogs. Further south, along the Gulf Coast, it is a species of wet pine savannas and flatwoods. It is typically found growing alongside the orchid species Arethusa bulbosa and Calopogon tuberosus.

== Ecology ==
=== Pollination ===
Rose pogonia orchids are pollinated by species of bumblebees such as Bombus borealis and Bombus fervidus. The flowers are deceptive towards their pollinators, offering no nectar rewards for their services.

== Taxonomy ==
The scientific name for the genus Pogonia derives from the Greek word pogon, meaning "beard", and refers to the flower's fringed labellum. The specific epithet ophioglossoides refers to the similarity to the fern Ophioglossum, whose foliage resembles a snake's tongue.
