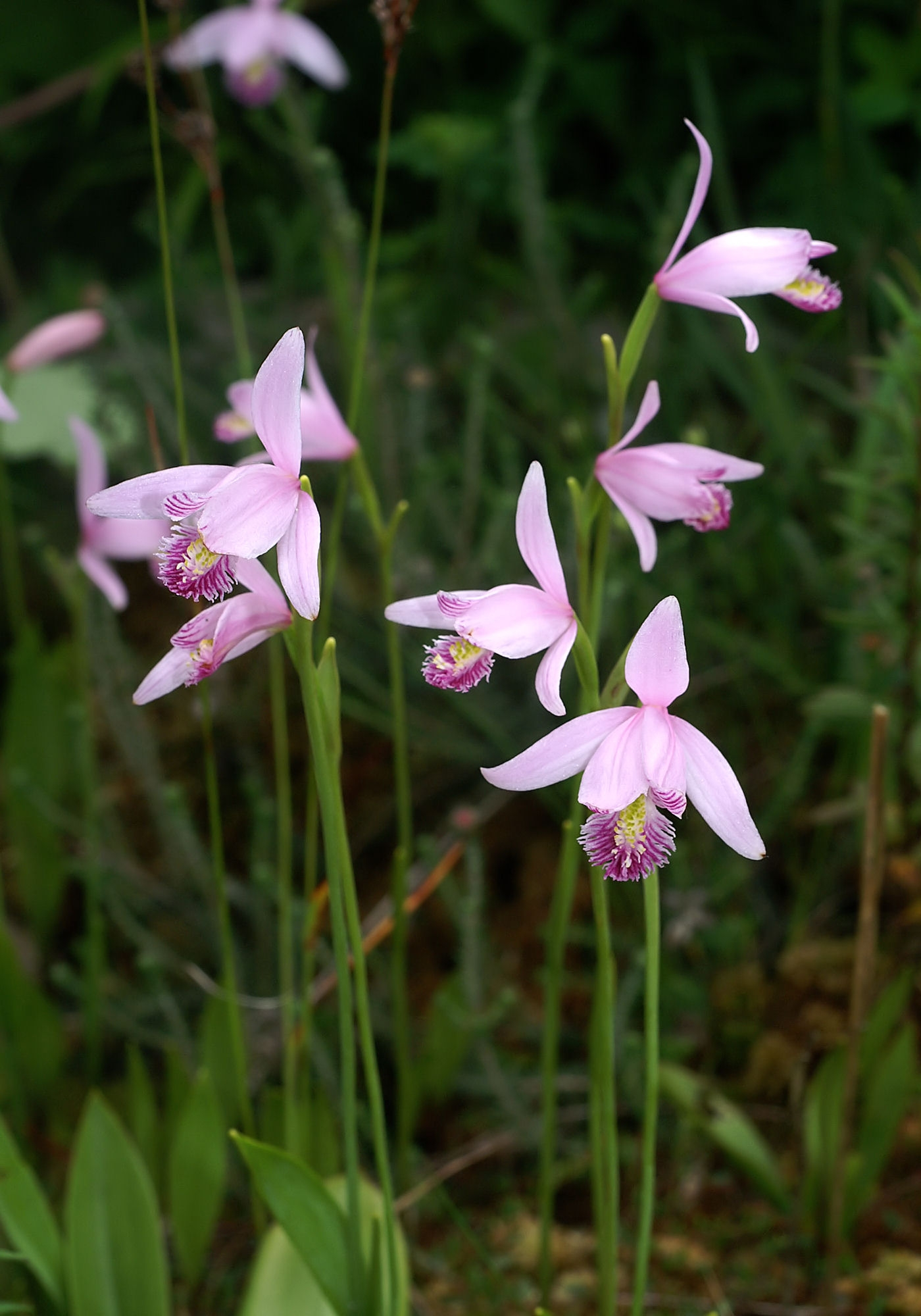
- Pogonia ophioglossoides

Scientific classification
- Kingdom: Plantae
- Clade: Tracheophytes
- Clade: Angiosperms
- Clade: Monocots
- Order: Asparagales
- Family: Orchidaceae
- Subfamily: Vanilloideae
- Tribe: Pogonieae; Pfitzer ex Garay & Dunsterv., Venez. Orchids III, 2: 28 (1961)

Genera
- Cleistes; Cleistesiopsis; Duckeella; Isotria; Pogonia

= Pogonieae =

Tribe of orchids

Pogonieae is an orchid tribe in the subfamily Vanilloideae.

== Taxonomy ==
- Pogonieae
  - - Cleistes Rich. ex Lindl.
  - - - - Cleistesiopsis Pansarin & F.Barros
      - - Pogonia Juss.
        - Isotria Raf.
    - Duckeella C.Porto & Brade

Phylogenetic relationships of Pogonieae genera.

=== Genera ===
Genera included in Pogonieae:

- Cleistes
- Cleistesiopsis
- Duckeella
- Isotria
- Pogonia

Pogoniopsis was previously included in Pogonieae, but is now placed in Triphorinae.

== See also ==
- Taxonomy of the Orchidaceae
