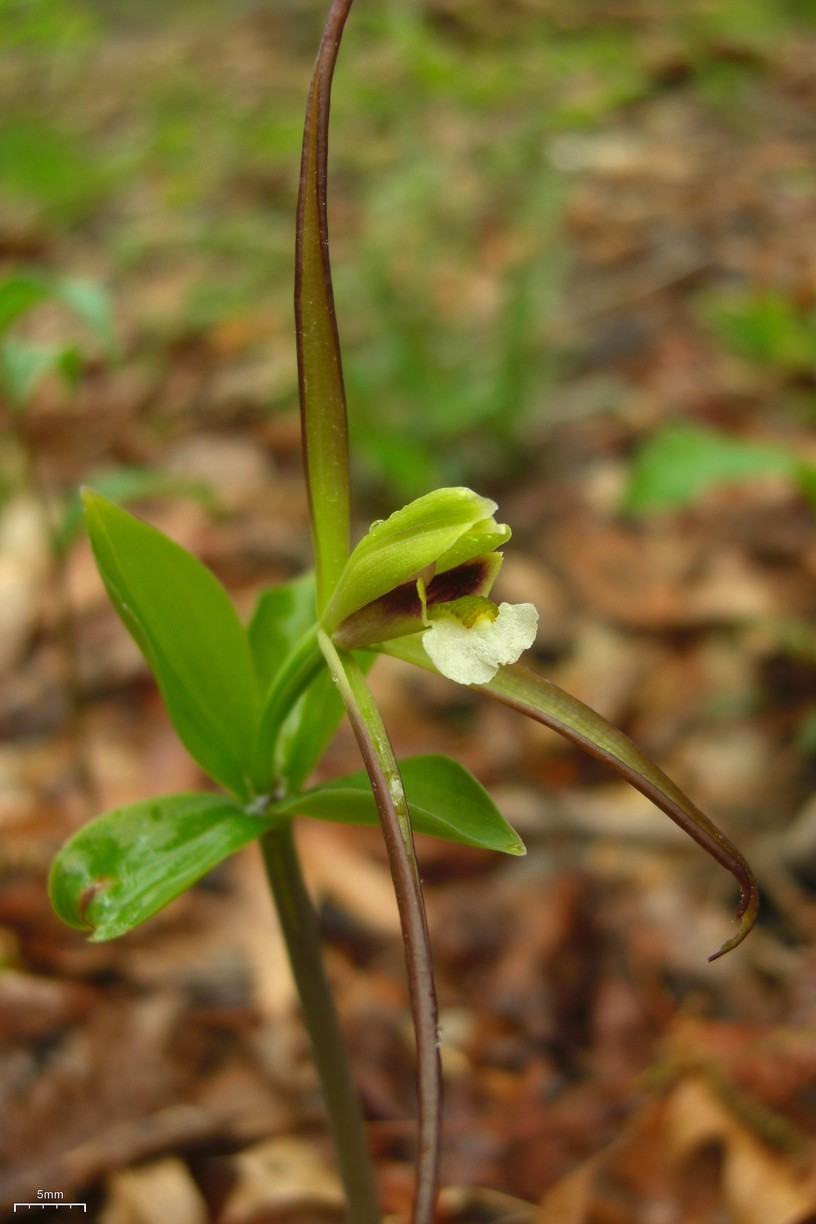
- Flower of a large whorled pogonia

Scientific classification
- Kingdom: Plantae
- Clade: Tracheophytes
- Clade: Angiosperms
- Clade: Monocots
- Order: Asparagales
- Family: Orchidaceae
- Subfamily: Vanilloideae
- Genus: Isotria
- Species: I. verticillata

Binomial name
- Isotria verticillata (Muhl. ex Willd.) Raf.

Synonyms
- Arethusa verticillata Muhl. ex Willd.; Odonectis verticillata (Muhl. ex Willd.) Raf.; Pogonia verticillata (Muhl. ex Willd.) Nutt.; Pogonia verticillata var. medeoloides Eaton

= Isotria verticillata =

Species of orchid

Isotria verticillata, commonly known as the large whorled pogonia and purple fiveleaf orchid, is an orchid species native to eastern North America.

== Distribution ==
The orchid's native range is across the Eastern United States in the Appalachian Mountains, the central and eastern Great Lakes region, and elsewhere from Maine south to Florida, and westward from Michigan south to Texas. It is also native to Ontario, Canada.

It grows in acidic soils in forests and in peat bogs.

== Description ==
Isotria verticillata is a terrestrial orchid of eastern North America spreading by underground rhizomes.

Its whorl of 5 or 6 leaves are green above, waxy and a bit whitened below.

The flowers are yellowish-green, up to 110 mm (4.3 inches) across.
