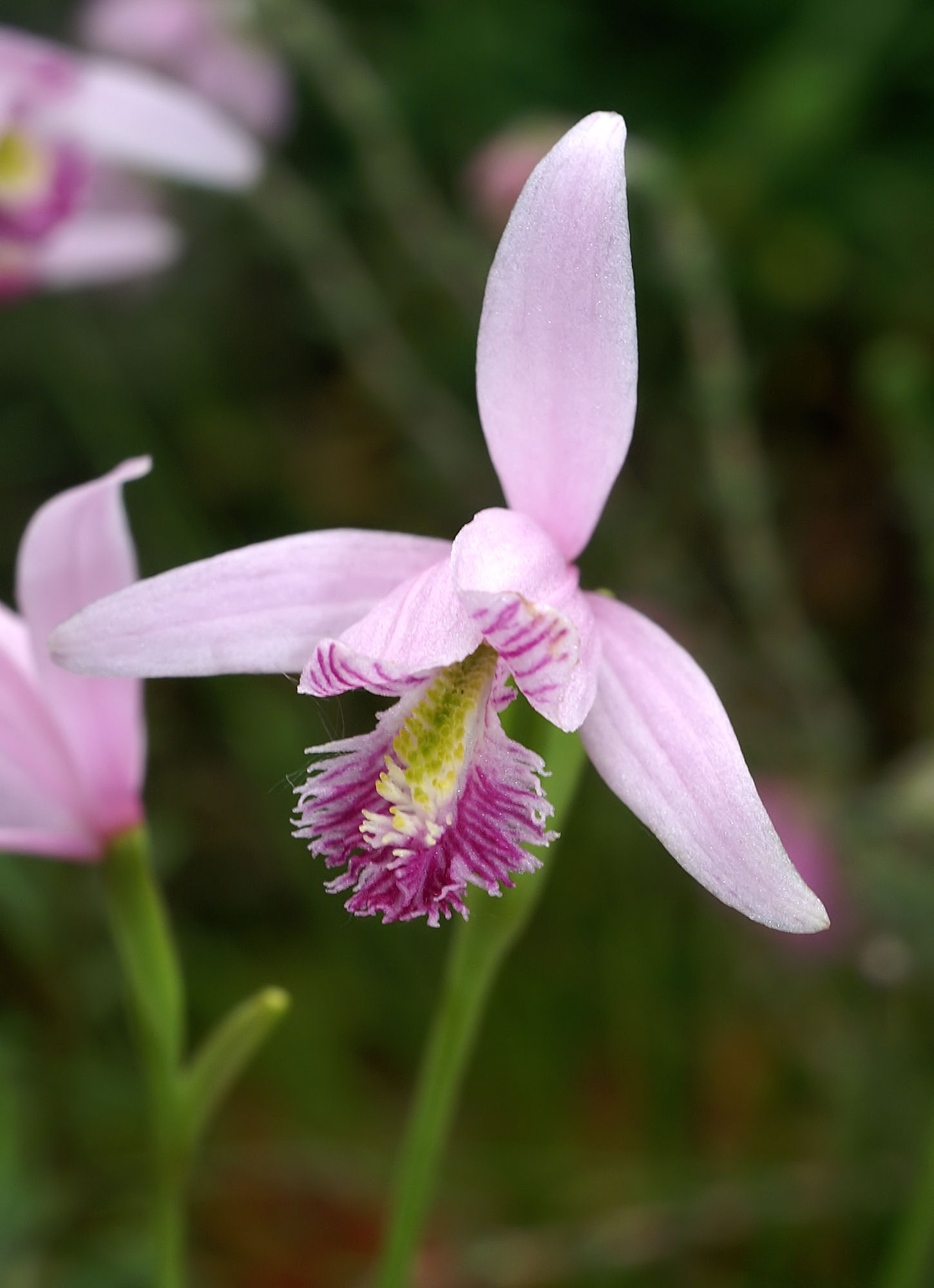
- Pogonia ophioglossoides

Scientific classification
- Kingdom: Plantae
- Clade: Tracheophytes
- Clade: Angiosperms
- Clade: Monocots
- Order: Asparagales
- Family: Orchidaceae
- Subfamily: Vanilloideae
- Tribe: Pogonieae
- Genus: Pogonia; Juss.

Species
- See text

= Pogonia (plant) =

Genus of orchids

Pogonia is a genus of orchids (family Orchidaceae) belonging to the subfamily Vanilloideae.

The genus takes its name from the Greek pōgōn and pōgōníās, meaning, respectively, 'beard' and 'bearded.'

The species of Pogonia are widespread in East Asia and eastern North America. They usually grow in open, sunny locations, often in moist to wet, sometimes flooded places.

== Species ==
Species of the genus Pogonia according to Plants of the World Online As of March 2023

Image	Name	Distribution	Elevation (m)
	Pogonia japonica Rchb.f., 1852	China (Anhui, Fujian, Guangxi, Guizhou, Heilongjiang, Hubei, Hunan, Jiangxi, Jilin, Inner Mongolia, Shandong, Sichuan, Yunnan, and Zhejiang), Japan, Korean Peninsula.	1,100–2,300 metres (3,600–7,500 ft)
	Pogonia minor (Makino) Makino 1909	Taiwan, Japan on Hokkaido, Honshu, Kyushu, Shikoku.	2,200–2,400 metres (7,200–7,900 ft)
	Pogonia ophioglossoides (L.) Ker Gawl. 1816 — snakemouth orchid	eastern United States and Canada.	0–49 metres (0–161 ft)
	Pogonia subalpina T.Yukawa & Y.Yamashita, 2017	Japan (Honshu)	
	Pogonia trinervia (Roxb.) Voigt 1845	Molucca Islands.	
	Pogonia yunnanensis Finet 1897	China in Yunnan province.	2,300–3,300 metres (7,500–10,800 ft)
