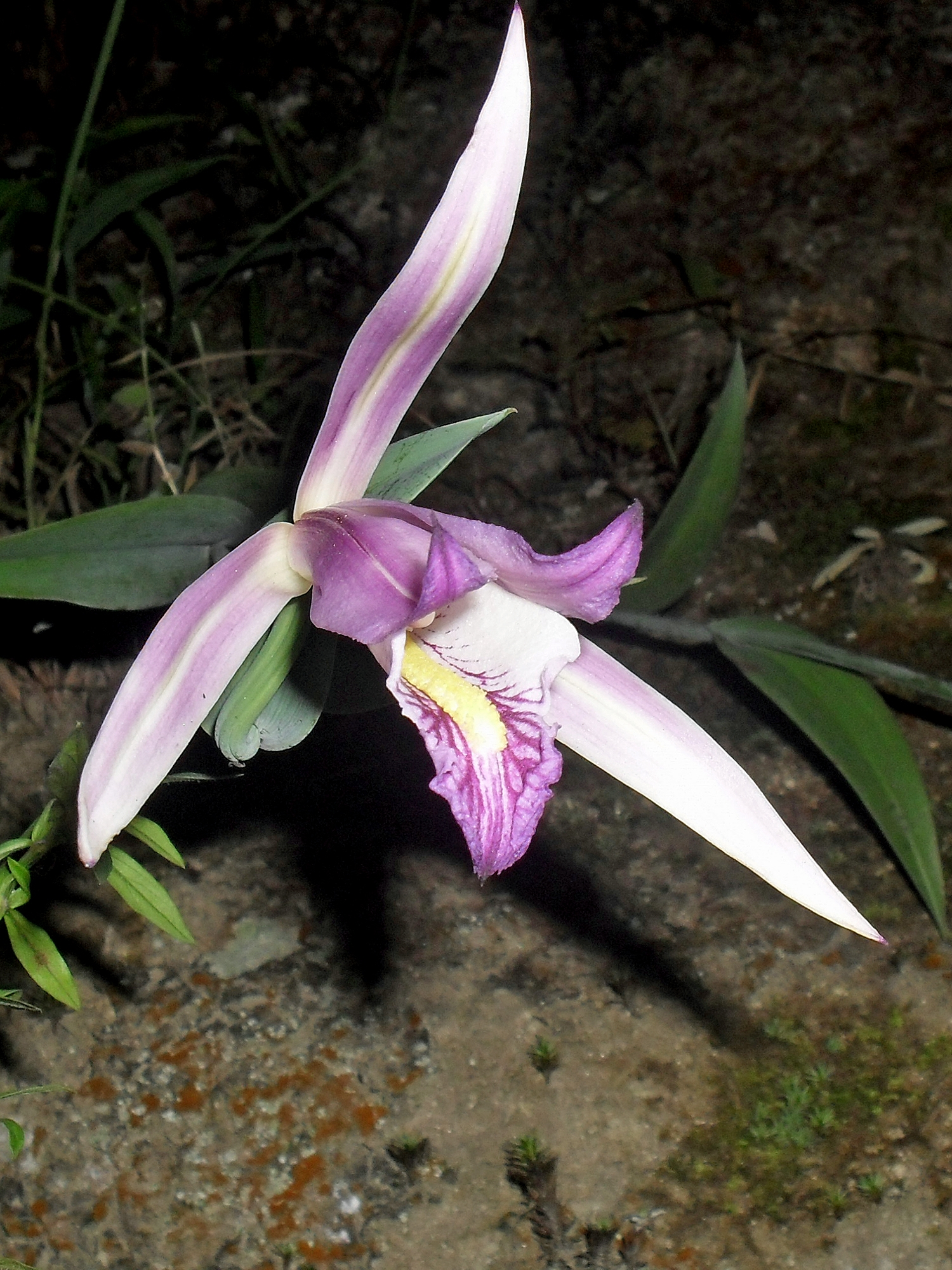
- Cleistes libonii

Scientific classification
- Kingdom: Plantae
- Clade: Tracheophytes
- Clade: Angiosperms
- Clade: Monocots
- Order: Asparagales
- Family: Orchidaceae
- Subfamily: Vanilloideae
- Tribe: Pogonieae
- Genus: Cleistes; Rich. ex Lindl. (1840)

Type species
- Cleistes lutea Lindl.

= Cleistes =

Genus of orchids

Cleistes is a genus of orchids (family Orchidaceae). It contains approximately 40–50 species, most of them native to South America, with a few species extending north into Costa Rica and Trinidad. Two North American species were formerly included in this group, but are now regarded as a separate genus, Cleistesiopsis.
