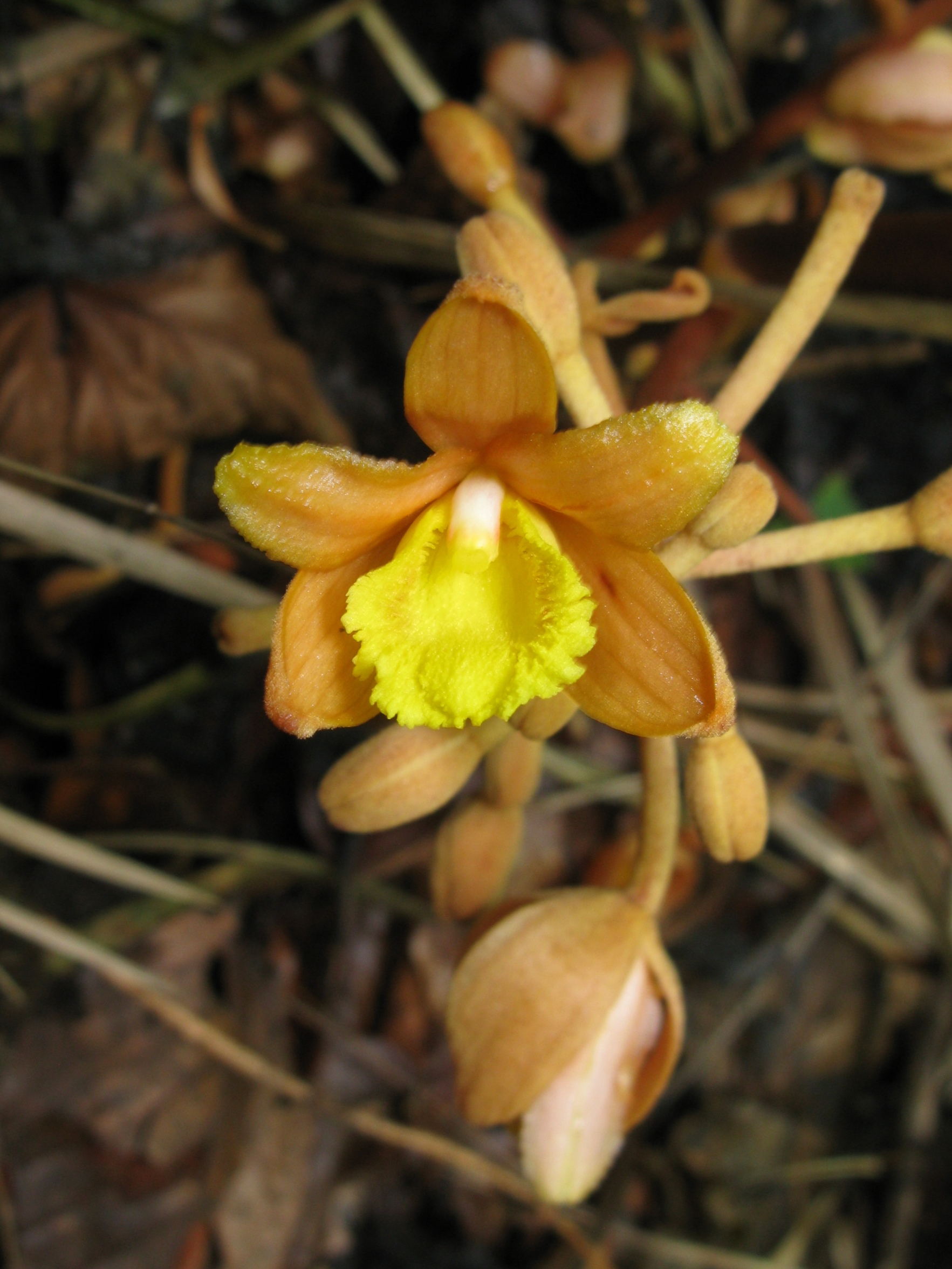
- Galeola septentrionalis

Scientific classification
- Kingdom: Plantae
- Clade: Tracheophytes
- Clade: Angiosperms
- Clade: Monocots
- Order: Asparagales
- Family: Orchidaceae
- Subfamily: Vanilloideae
- Tribe: Vanilleae
- Genus: Galeola; Lour.

Species
- See text

Synonyms
- Pogochilus Falc.

= Galeola =

Genus of orchids

Galeola is a genus of orchids in the family Orchidaceae belonging to the subfamily Vanilloideae.

All species in this genus are myco-heterotrophic, i.e. they are parasitic upon fungi. The genus is spread throughout southeast Asia (from India to China to New Guinea) as well as Madagascar and Comoros.

Galeola is of biological interest because of its exclusive myco-heterotrophic nature and its seeds. The seeds are the biggest orchid seeds in the world. They are winged, which is also extraordinary for an orchid.

== Species ==
At present, there are 6 currently recognized species:

- Galeola cathcarthii Hook.f. - Thailand, Myanmar, India (Assam, Sikkim) Bhutan
- Galeola faberi Rolfe - China, Assam, Nepal, Vietnam, Sumatra
- Galeola falconeri Hook.f. - India (Assam), Bhutan, Nepal, Taiwan, Thailand, Vietnam, China
- Galeola humblotii H.G.Reichb. - Madagascar, Comoros
- Galeola lindleyana (Hook.f. & J.W.Thomson) H.G.Reichb.- Bhutan, China, India (Assam), Sumatra, Vietnam, Nepal, Taiwan
- Galeola nudifolia Lour. (1790) - China, India (Assam), Indonesia, Malaysia, Philippines, Thailand, Vietnam, Laos, Cambodia, Burma, New Guinea
