= 2,4-Bis(4-hydroxybenzyl)phenol =

Names
- Preferred IUPAC name 4,4′-[(4-Hydroxy-1,3-phenylene)bis(methylene)]diphenol

Identifiers
| CAS Number | 34826-64-7 |
| 3D model (JSmol) | Interactive image |
| ChEMBL | ChEMBL3286745 |
| ChemSpider | 167654 |
| MeSH | C087793 |
| PubChem CID | 193195 |
| UNII | JZ8542V589 |
| CompTox Dashboard (EPA) | DTXSID70188364 |
- InChI: InChI=1S/C20H18O3/c21-18-6-1-14(2-7-18)11-16-5-10-20(23)17(13-16)12-15-3-8-19(22)9-4-15/h1-10,13,21-23H,11-12H2 Key: YQOVRUAPWCGSLC-UHFFFAOYSA-N
- SMILES: c2cc(O)ccc2Cc1cc(ccc1O)Cc3ccc(O)cc3

Properties
| Chemical formula | C_{20}H_{18}O_{3} |
| Molar mass | 306.361 g·mol^{−1} |
- Except where otherwise noted, data are given for materials in their standard state (at 25 °C [77 °F], 100 kPa). Infobox references

2,4-Bis(4-hydroxybenzyl)phenol is a phenolic compound produced by the saprophytic orchid Gastrodia elata and by the myco-heterotroph orchid Galeola faberi.
