= Cyrtosia javanica =

Scientific classification
- Kingdom: Plantae
- Clade: Tracheophytes
- Clade: Angiosperms
- Clade: Monocots
- Order: Asparagales
- Family: Orchidaceae
- Subfamily: Vanilloideae
- Genus: Cyrtosia
- Species: C. javanica

Binomial name
- Cyrtosia javanica Blume

Synonyms
- Galeola javanica (Blume) Benth. & Hook.f.; Conchoglossum montanum Breda; Cyrtosia minahassae (Schltr.) Garay; Cyrtosia plurialata Seidenf.; Galeola kawakamii J.J.Sm. ex Koord.-Schum.; Galeola minahassae Schltr.

Species of orchid

Cyrtosia javanica is a rare, mycoheterotrophic orchid from the Vanilloideae subfamily. It is native to tropical Asia, specifically in Assam, the Bismarck Archipelago, Borneo, Cambodia, the Eastern Himalayas, Java, Laos, Malaysia, Myanmar, New Guinea, Philippines, Sulawesi, Sumatra, Taiwan, Thailand and Vietnam.

Cyrtosia taiwanica has been mistaken for Cyrtosia javanica, leading to the latter being thought to have originated from Taiwan.
