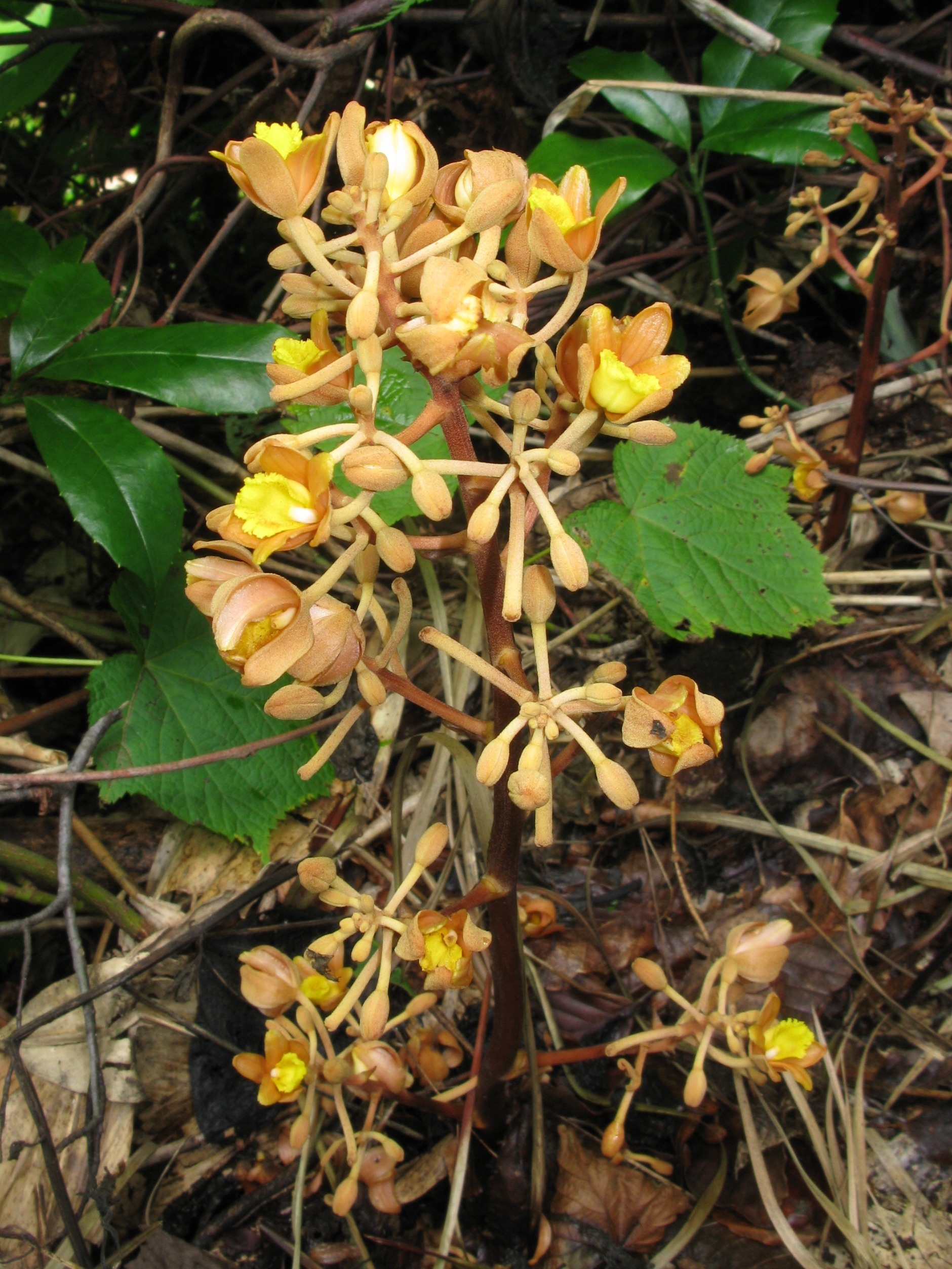

Scientific classification
- Kingdom: Plantae
- Clade: Tracheophytes
- Clade: Angiosperms
- Clade: Monocots
- Order: Asparagales
- Family: Orchidaceae
- Subfamily: Vanilloideae
- Genus: Cyrtosia
- Species: C. septentrionalis

Binomial name
- Cyrtosia septentrionalis (Rchb.f.) Garay

Synonyms
- Galeola septentrionalis Rchb.f.

= Cyrtosia septentrionalis =

Species of flowering plant

Cyrtosia septentrionalis is a species of plant in the family Orchidaceae. It is a achlorophyllous myco-heterotrophic species found in Japan, Korea, Ryukyu Islands, and China (Anhui, Henan, Hunan, and Zhejiang). It is a perennial plant that blooms in early summer, though can apparently enter prolonged dormancy for extended periods of time before reappearing and blooming again. it feeds on the wood decaying fungi armillaria, primarily armillaria gallica, and armillaria mellea.
