= Mining maquis =

Type of biome in New Caledonia

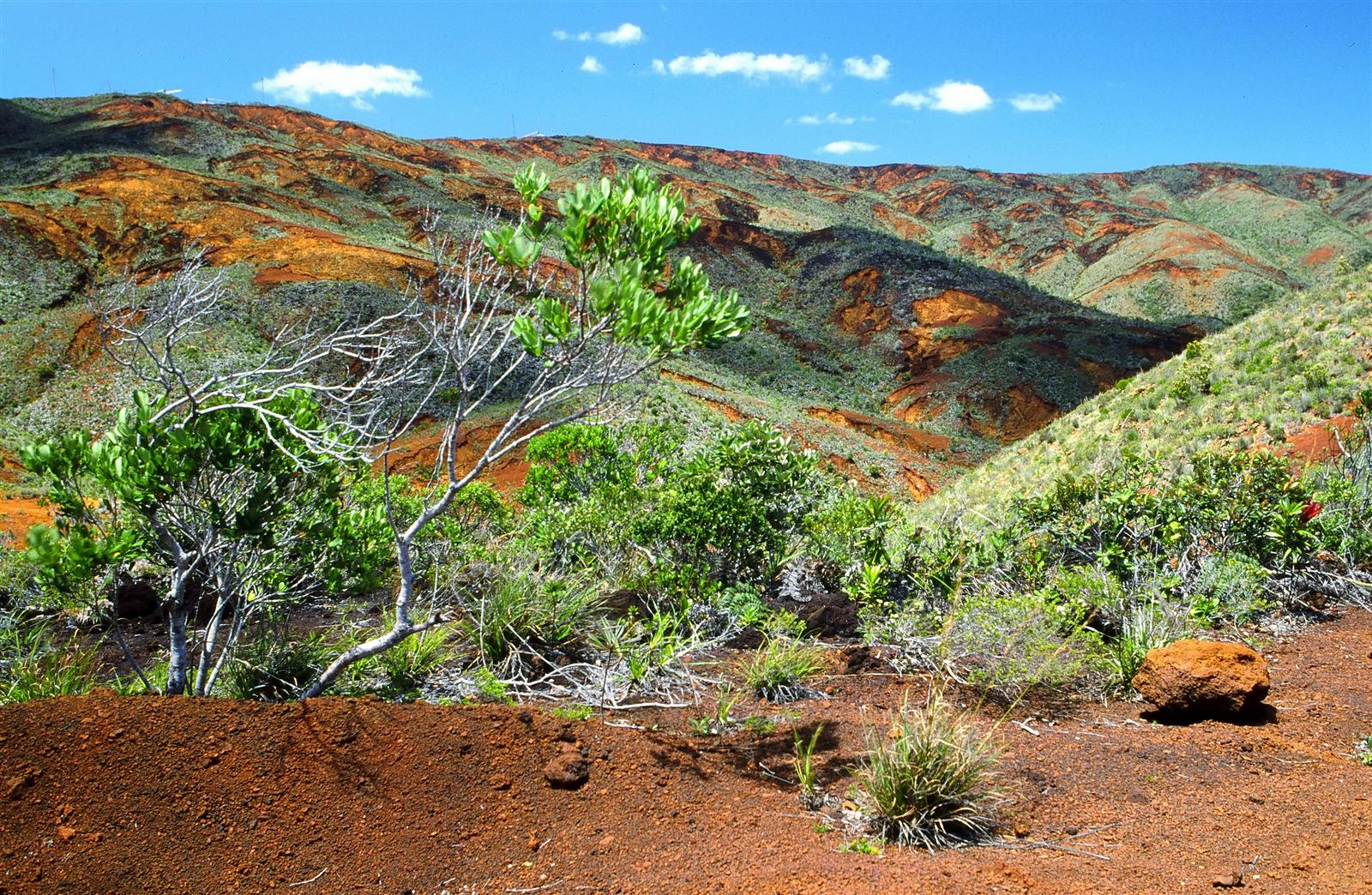
Mining maquis typical of southern New Caledonia. The orange-red color of the rocks is due to the richness of metal oxides in the soil.

Mining maquis (French: maquis minier) is a type of shrubland biome. It forms on ultramafic rock as a result of forest cover retreat due to repeated wildfires. It is common on New Caledonia.

== Description ==
Mining maquis covers 4,400 km^{2} (1,700 sq mi) in New Caledonia, where it is one of the native ecotypes. Most species found in the maquis are native, compared to some regions which are up to 90% introduced species.

Plants are evergreen xerophytes and heliophytes, including prostrate shrubs and sedges. Araucaria and Agathis ovata can be locally dominant.

=== Mineral composition ===
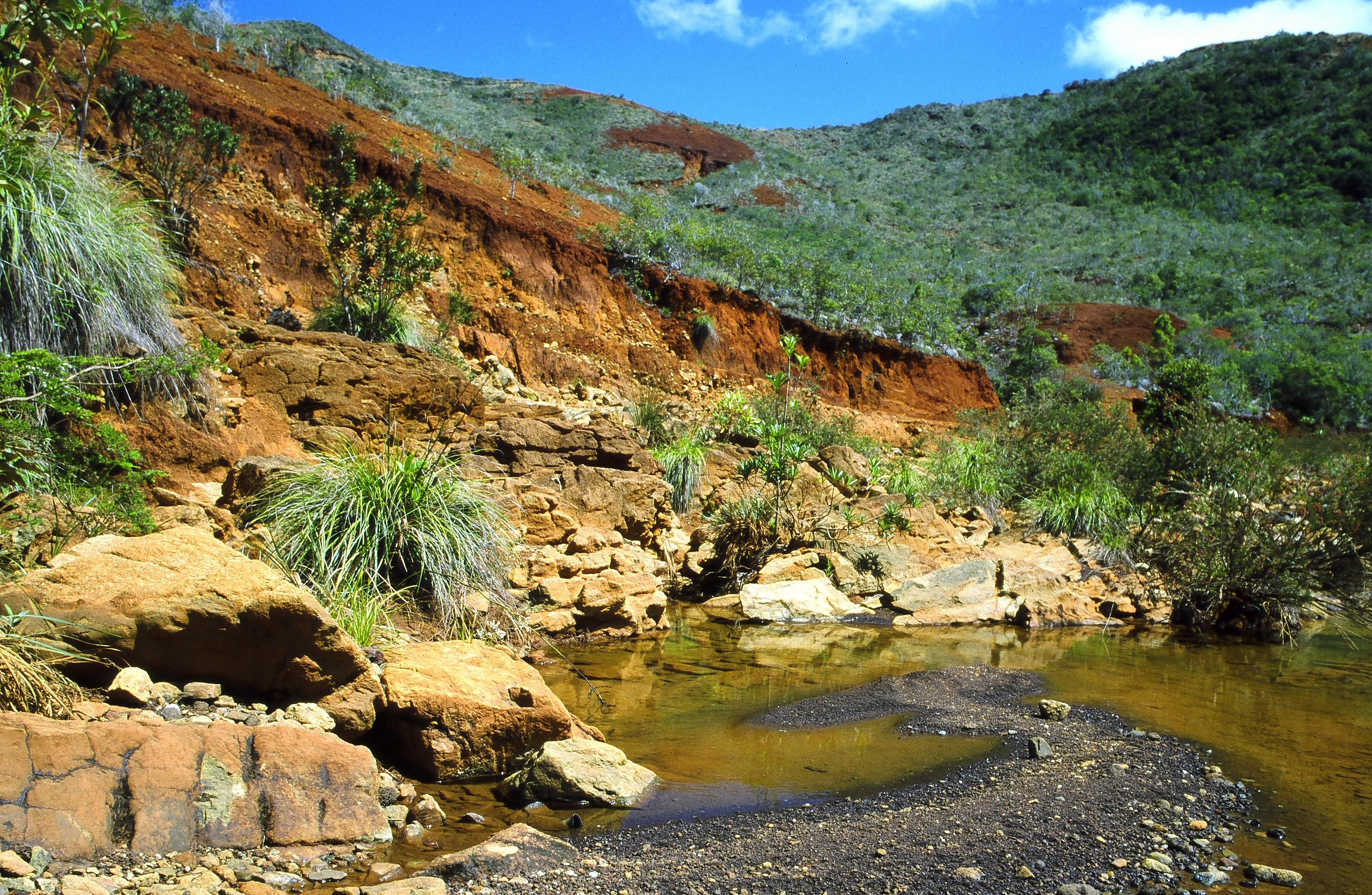
A river rich in iron oxides and nickel

Soils are excessively poor in phosphorus, potassium and calcium and often abnormally rich in magnesium. This richness in magnesium leads to an imbalance in the calcium/magnesium ratio, in particular in the brown soils located at the base of the massifs which dominate the west coast (Boulinda, Kopéto, Koniambo, Tiébaghi, etc.) Most mining maquis soils also have abnormally high levels of chromium, cobalt, nickel and manganese, the latter two elements having been found to be toxic in some soils. These particular edaphic conditions are the main cause of the low dynamism of the mining maquis, which results in a slow growth of the species, a remarkable floristic and structural stability in the absence of disturbance and a certain resistance to anthropization, marked by the absence of any lasting invasion of gregarious introduced species.

=== Flora ===
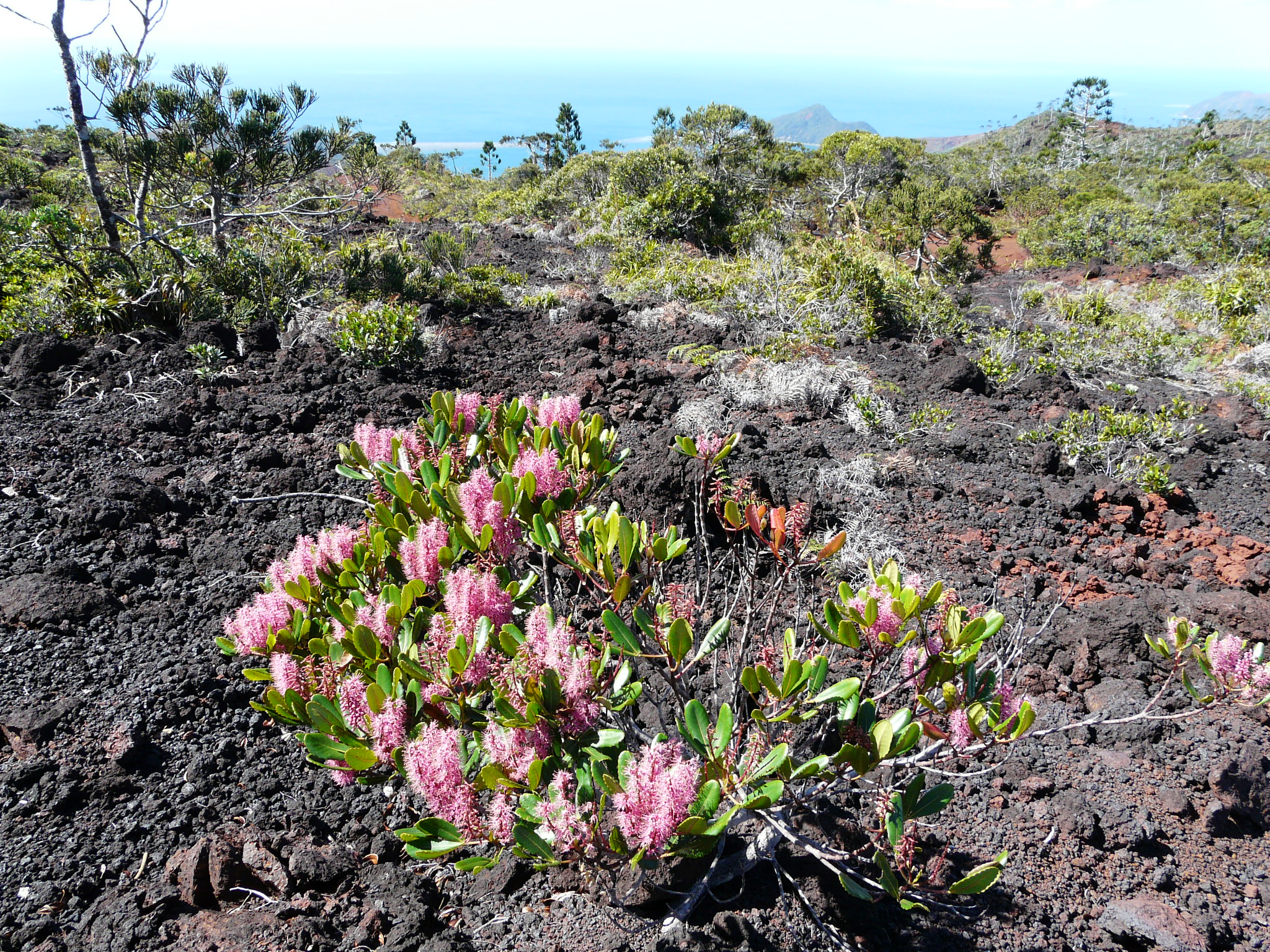
Rupicolous plant growing on mining maquis, Goro, New Caledonia

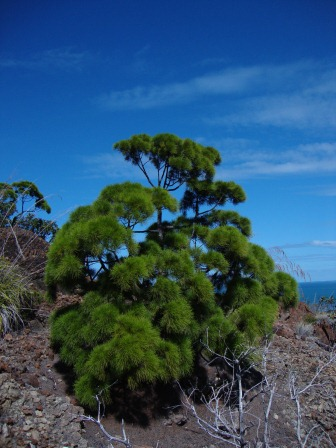
Shrub growing on the Tiébaghi massif

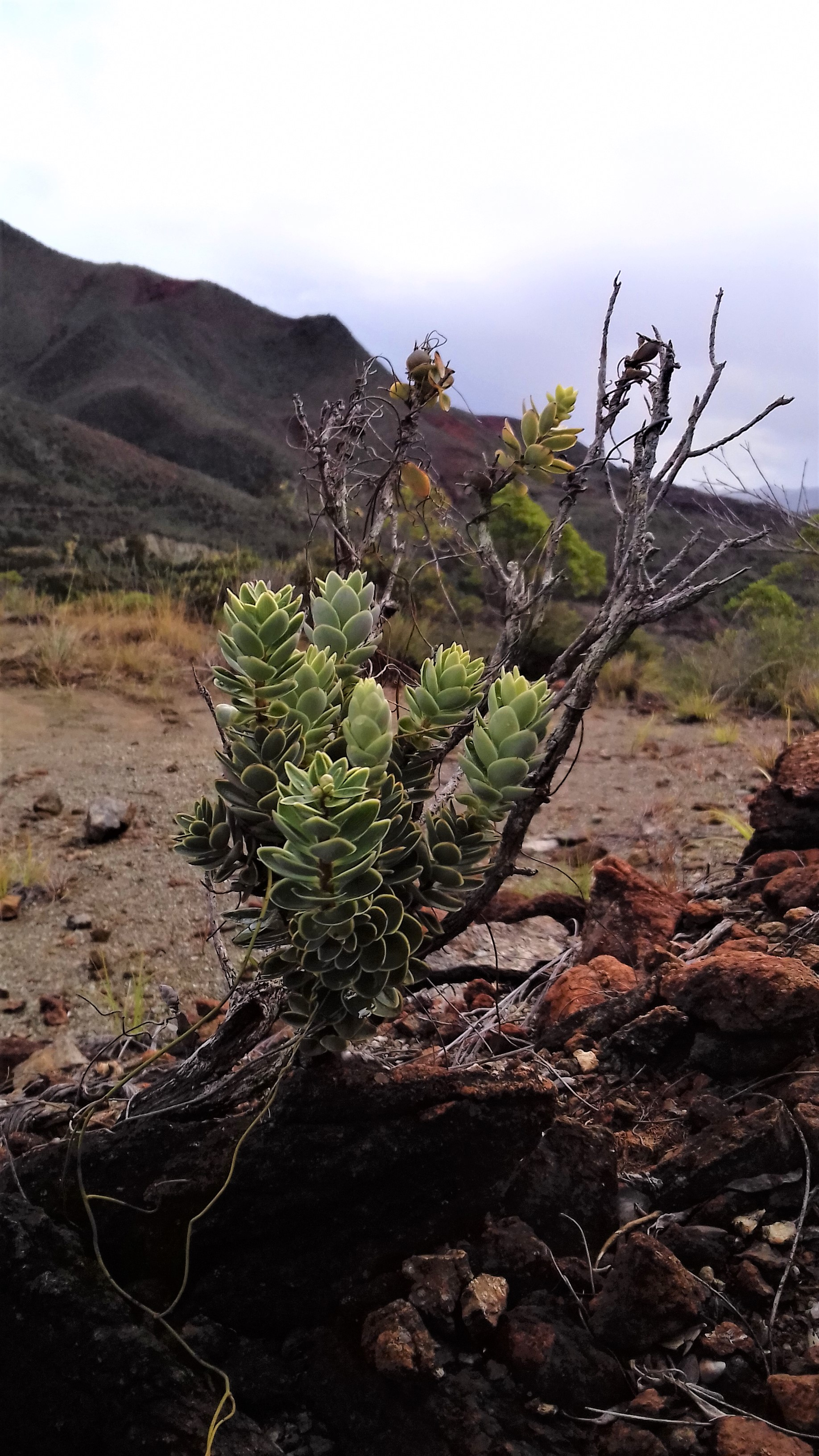
Cyathopsis albicans (Pic aux Chèvres, Le Mont-Dore)

Around 1,140 plant species have been identified in mining maquis, 89% of which are endemic. It is the environment with the highest rate of endemism in New Caledonia (88%). In terms of diversity, it ranks second for terrestrial environments after the humid forests. The flora of mining maquis grows on soils poor in nutrients and rich in potentially toxic minerals. These soils accumulate heat and retain little rainwater. The plants of the mining maquis have slow growth and adaptations which allow them to survive in these very difficult conditions. They are very tolerant of toxic minerals and their glossy, leathery leaves are drought resistant.

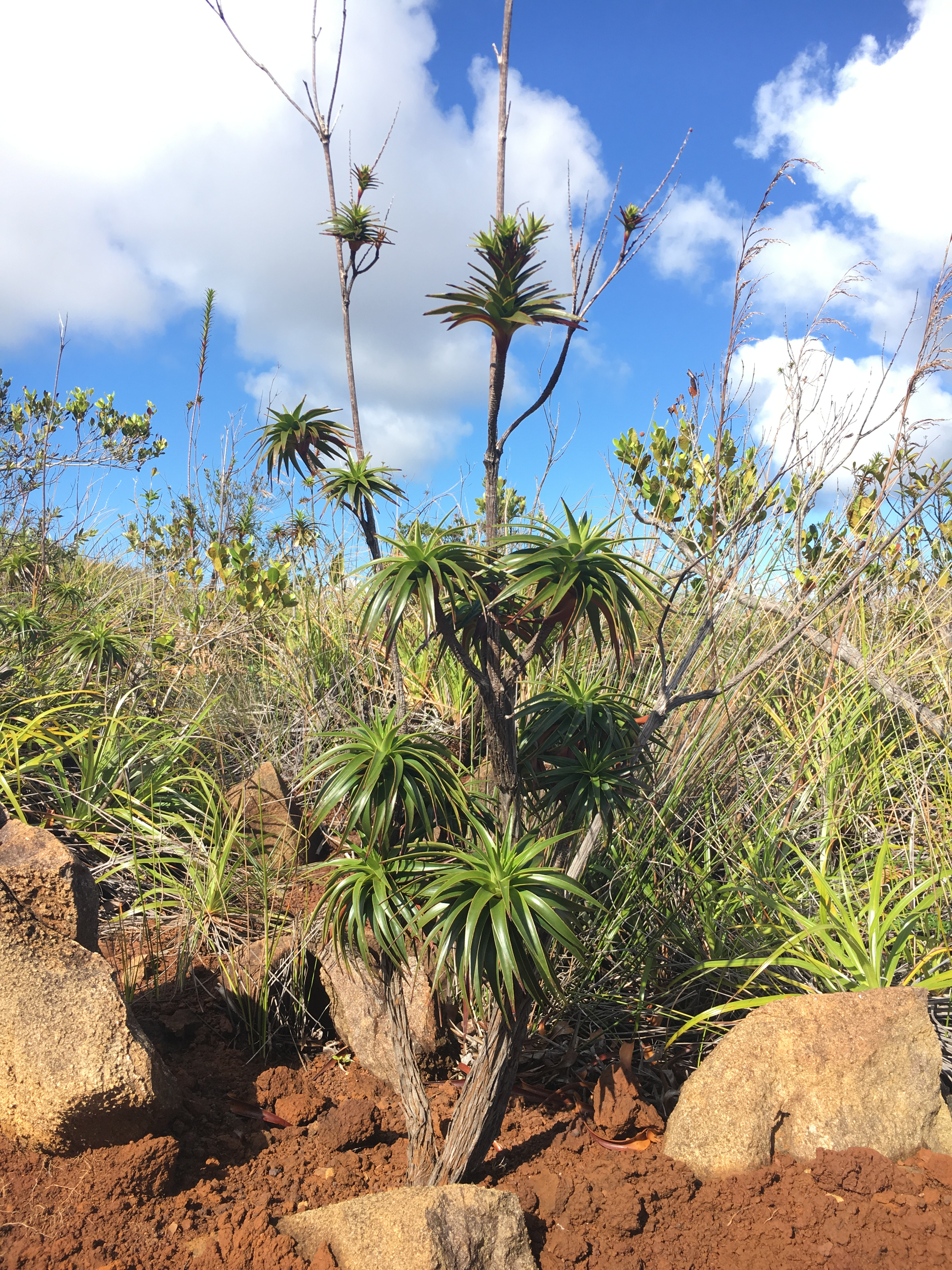
Dracophyllum verticillatum, shrub that can be found on mining maquis

Fourteen genera of plants are endemic to mining maquis: Beaupreopsis, Deltaria, Eriaxis, Garnieria, Myricanthe, Myrtastrum, Neocallitropsis, Nephrodesmus, Normandia, Oceanopapaver, Peripterygia, Planchonella, Pycnandra, Solmsia, as well as the section Neo-caledonicae of the genus Oxalis.

The abundance of endemic species and genera in the flora specific to mining maquis reflects its age. This flora possesses elements contemporaneous with or prior to the establishment of the periodotites, some 30 million years ago. Before that time, evolutionarily similar groups must have already occupied sites unsuitable for the development of the dense humid forest, such as on exposed ridges, eroded soils, and hydromorphic zones.

=== Fauna ===
Mining maquis are home to a great diversity of fauna. This is adapted to the difficult living conditions that prevail in this environment and the rate of endemism is high. These are mainly insects and reptiles, thrive in the dry and rocky habitat. A few birds are typical of the mining maquis, and species from the surrounding forests also frequent it.

== Distribution ==
Mining maquis are very widespread in New Caledonia, covering 23% of the territory. However, they are more common south of Grande Terre. They develop in variable climatic conditions, from the coast to the highest peaks.

== Threats and conservation ==
Because they grow on nickel-rich soils, mining maquis are threatened by mining activities that may develop in these areas. Nickel mining is done in the open, therefore, soil is stripped and the vegetation completely destroyed. Implementing soil stabilization and revegetation programs of mining sites after exploitation is now a major concern for the nickel industry.

Mining maquis are also vulnerable to fires. The foliage of the plants often lack water and are sometimes rich in volatile compounds, which makes them very flammable.

The flora of the mining maquis is also threatened by the introduction of invasive species such as the Caribbean pine capable of developing on Lateritic nickel ore deposits, and deer.

== See also ==
- Maquis shrubland

== Bibliography ==
- Frédéric Rigault, Gilles Dagostini et Tanguy Jaffré, « Relations entre les teneurs en nickel et manganèse foliaires de quelques espèces des maquis miniers et les risques de phyto-toxicité induits par ces éléments minéraux du sol », dans Ecologie des milieux sur roches ultramafiques et sur sols métallifères : actes de la deuxième conférence internationale sur l'écologie des milieux serpentiniques, ORSTOM, coll. « Documents Scientifiques et Techniques - ORSTOM : III », 1997 (lire en ligne [PDF]), p. 187–195
- Bordez, Laurent (2015-09-18). Stratégies de revégétalisation des maquis miniers nickélifères de Nouvelle-Calédonie: étude sur les potentiels biologiques des Topsoils en vue de leur utilisation pour la restauration écologique des milieux dégradés (These de doctorat). Nouvelle Calédonie.
- Tanguy Jaffré; Frédéric Rigault; Gilles Dagostlnl (1998). "Impact des feux de brousse sur les maquis ligno-herbacés des roches ultramafiques de Nouvelle-Calédonie" (pdf). Adansonia. 98848 Nouméa, Nouvelle-Calédonie: Laboratoire de Botanique et d’Écologie Vegétale, Centre ORSTOM, BP A5.
- L'Huillier, Laurent; Jaffré, Tanguy; Wulff, Adrien (2010). Mines et environnement en Nouvelle-Calédonie (in French). Éditions IAC. ISBN 978-2-9523950-8-3.
