= Duckeella =

Scientific classification
- Kingdom: Plantae
- Clade: Tracheophytes
- Clade: Angiosperms
- Clade: Monocots
- Order: Asparagales
- Family: Orchidaceae
- Subfamily: Vanilloideae
- Tribe: Pogonieae
- Genus: Duckeella; C.Porto & Brade

Genus of orchids

Duckeella is a genus of orchids (family Orchidaceae), belonging to the subfamily Vanilloideae. It has 8 known species, all native to South America:

The genus name of Duckesia is in honour of Adolpho Ducke (1876–1959), an entomologist, botanist and ethnographer specializing in Amazonia. It was first published and described in Anais Reunião Sul-Amer. Bot. Vol.3 on page 31 in 1938 (published 1939).

== List of species ==
Species in the genus include:

- Duckeella adolphii Porto & Brade
- Duckeella alticola C.Schweinf.
- Duckeella caquetana Szlach. & Kolan.
- Duckeella fernandezii Szlach., Kolan. & Baranow
- Duckeella garayi Szlach., Kolan. & Baranow
- Duckeella humboldtii Kolan. & Szlach.
- Duckeella linearilabia Szlach., Kolan. & Baranow
- Duckeella pauciflora Garay
