= Galeola faberi =

Scientific classification
- Kingdom: Plantae
- Clade: Embryophytes
- Clade: Tracheophytes
- Clade: Angiosperms
- Clade: Monocots
- Order: Asparagales
- Family: Orchidaceae
- Subfamily: Vanilloideae
- Genus: Galeola
- Species: G. faberi

Binomial name
- Galeola faberi Rolfe

Species of orchid

Galeola faberi is an orchid species in the genus Galeola found in central and southern China, as well as in Nepal, the eastern Himalayas, Vietnam and Sumatra.

The phenolic compounds p-hydroxybenzaldehyde, 4,4'-dihydroxy-diphenyl methane, 2,4-bis(4-hydroxybenzyl) phenol, 5-methoxy-3-(2-phenyl-E-ethenyl)-2,4-bis (4-hydroxybenzyl) phenol (IV), p-hydroxybenzyl alcohol (V), 4-(beta-D-glucopyranosyloxy) benzyl alcohol (gastrodin), bis[4-(beta-D-glucopyranosyloxy) benzyl] (S)-2-isopropylmalate and bis [4-(beta-D-glucopyranosyloxy) benzyl] (S)-2-sec-butylmalate can be isolated from the rhizome of G. faberi.
