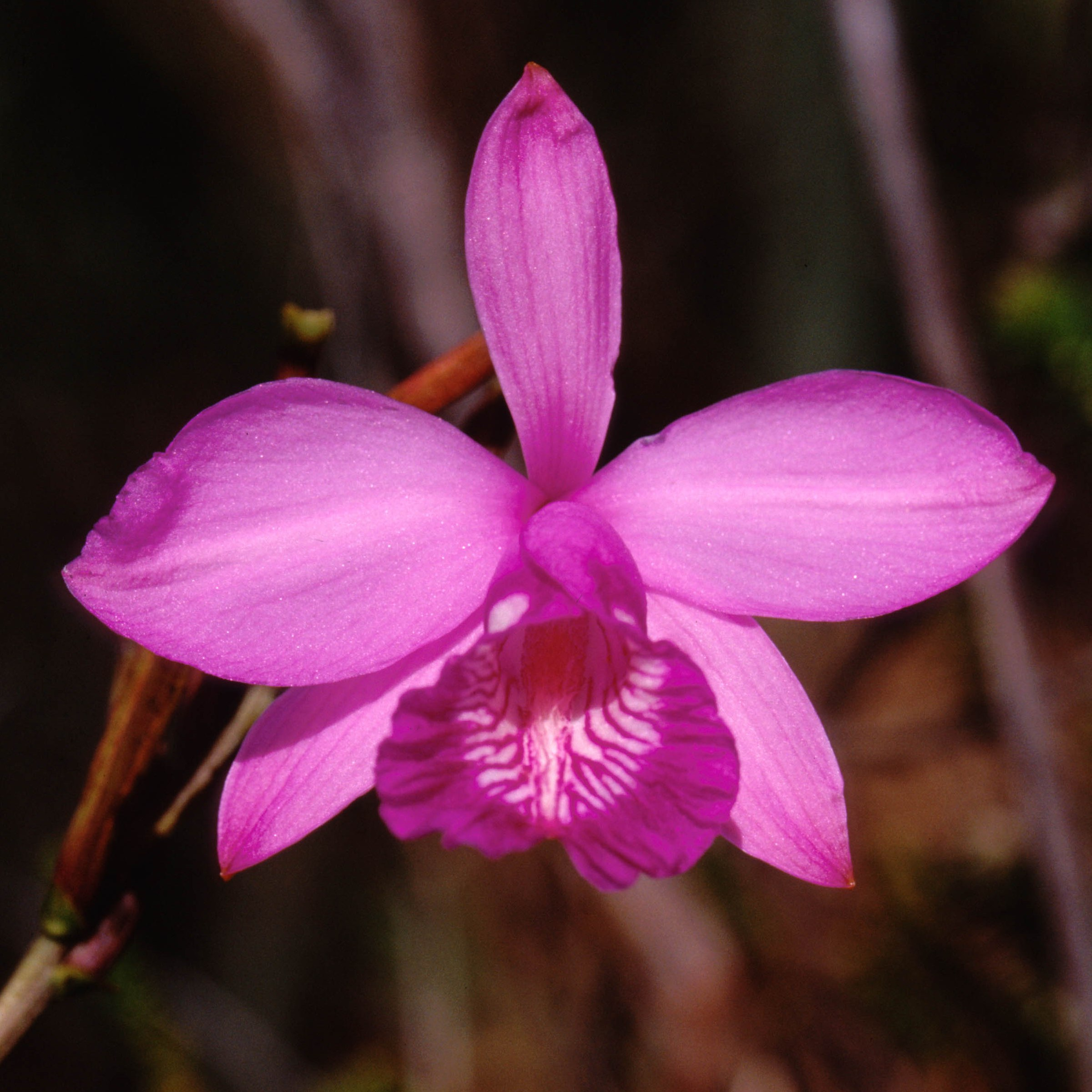
- Epistephium williamsii

Scientific classification
- Kingdom: Plantae
- Clade: Tracheophytes
- Clade: Angiosperms
- Clade: Monocots
- Order: Asparagales
- Family: Orchidaceae
- Subfamily: Vanilloideae
- Tribe: Vanilleae
- Genus: Epistephium; Kunth

= Epistephium =

Genus of orchids

Epistephium is a genus of flowering plants from the orchid family, Orchidaceae. It is native to South America, with a few species in Belize and Trinidad.

1. Epistephium amabile Schltr.
2. Epistephium amplexicaule Poepp. & Endl.
3. Epistephium brevicristatum R.E.Schult.
4. Epistephium duckei Huber
5. Epistephium elatum Kunth in F.W.H.von Humboldt, A.J.A.Bonpland & C.S.Kunth
6. Epistephium ellipticum R.O.Williams & Summerh. (Belize)
7. Epistephium frederici-augusti Rchb.f. & Warsz.
8. Epistephium hernandii Garay
9. Epistephium lamprophyllum Schltr.
10. Epistephium laxiflorum Barb.Rodr.
11. Epistephium lobulosum Garay
12. Epistephium matogrossense Hoehne
13. Epistephium parviflorum Lindl.
14. Epistephium portellianum Barb.Rodr.
15. Epistephium praestans Hoehne
16. Epistephium sclerophyllum Lindl. (includes now E
17. Epistephium sessiliflorum Lindl.
18. Epistephium speciosum Barb.Rodr.
19. Epistephium subrepens Hoehne
20. Epistephium williamsii Hook.f.

== See also ==
- List of Orchidaceae genera
