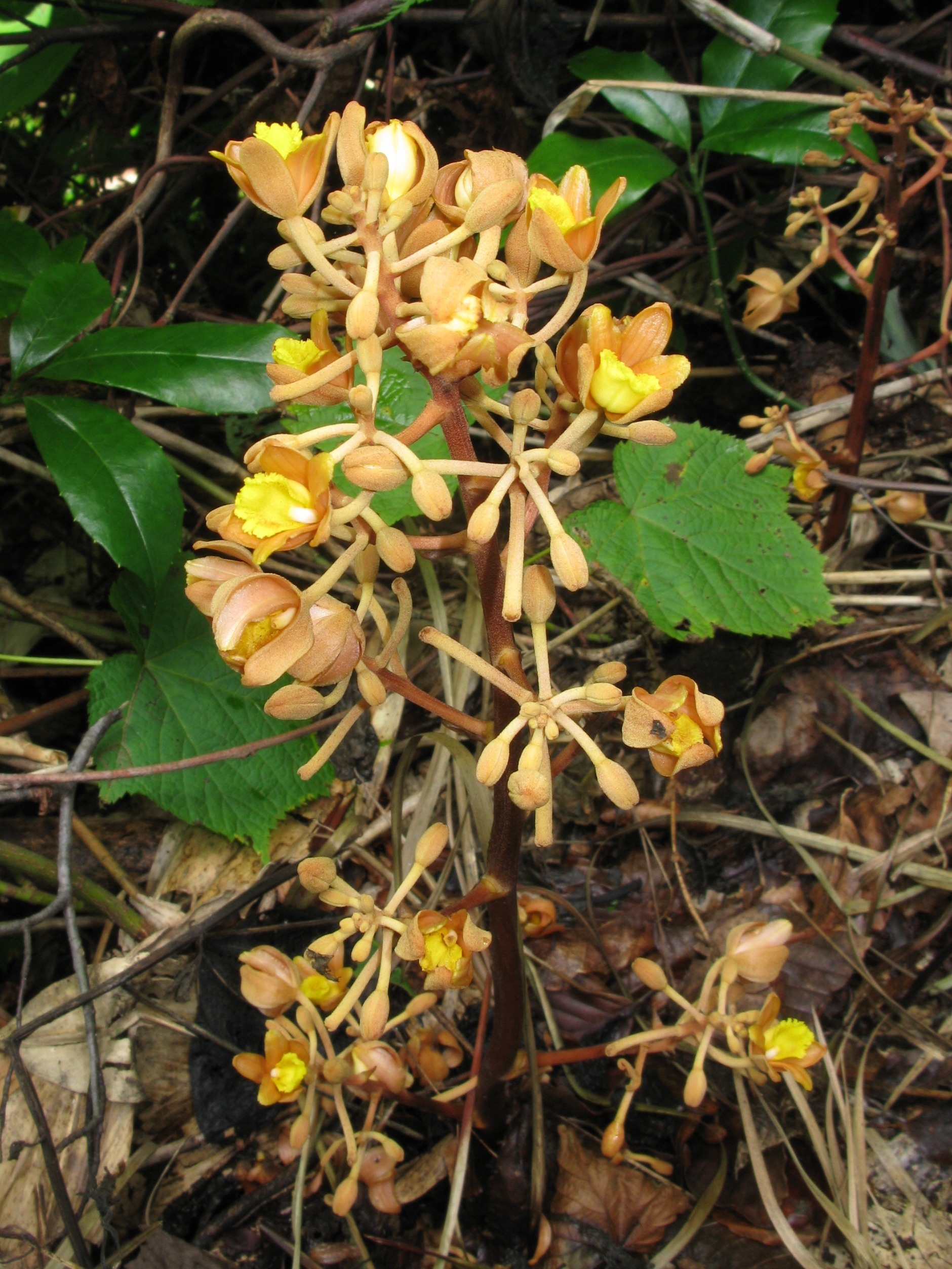
- Cyrtosia septentrionalis

Scientific classification
- Kingdom: Plantae
- Clade: Tracheophytes
- Clade: Angiosperms
- Clade: Monocots
- Order: Asparagales
- Family: Orchidaceae
- Subfamily: Vanilloideae
- Tribe: Vanilleae
- Genus: Cyrtosia; Blume

Type species
- Cyrtosia javanica Blume

Synonyms
- Conchoglossum Breda

= Cyrtosia (plant) =

Genus of orchids

Cyrtosia is a genus of flowering plants from the orchid family, Orchidaceae. It contains seven described species, native to areas from the Indian subcontinent to China and Southeast Asia.

As of October 2026, Plants of the World Online accepts the following seven species:

- Cyrtosia falconeri (Hook.f.) Aver. – Himalayas to China and Vietnam
- Cyrtosia integra (Rolfe ex Downie) Garay – East Himalaya, Laos, Thailand, Vietnam
- Cyrtosia javanica Blume – Indo-China, Malesia, New Guinea
- Cyrtosia lindleyana Hook.f. & Thomson – Himalayas to China and Sumatra
- Cyrtosia nana (Rolfe ex Downie) Garay – Assam, China & Indo-China
- Cyrtosia septentrionalis (Rchb.f.) Garay – China, Japan, Korea, & Taiwan
- Cyrtosia taiwanica K.H.Wang & T.P.Lin – Taiwan

== See also ==
- List of Orchidaceae genera
- List of myco-heterotrophic genera
