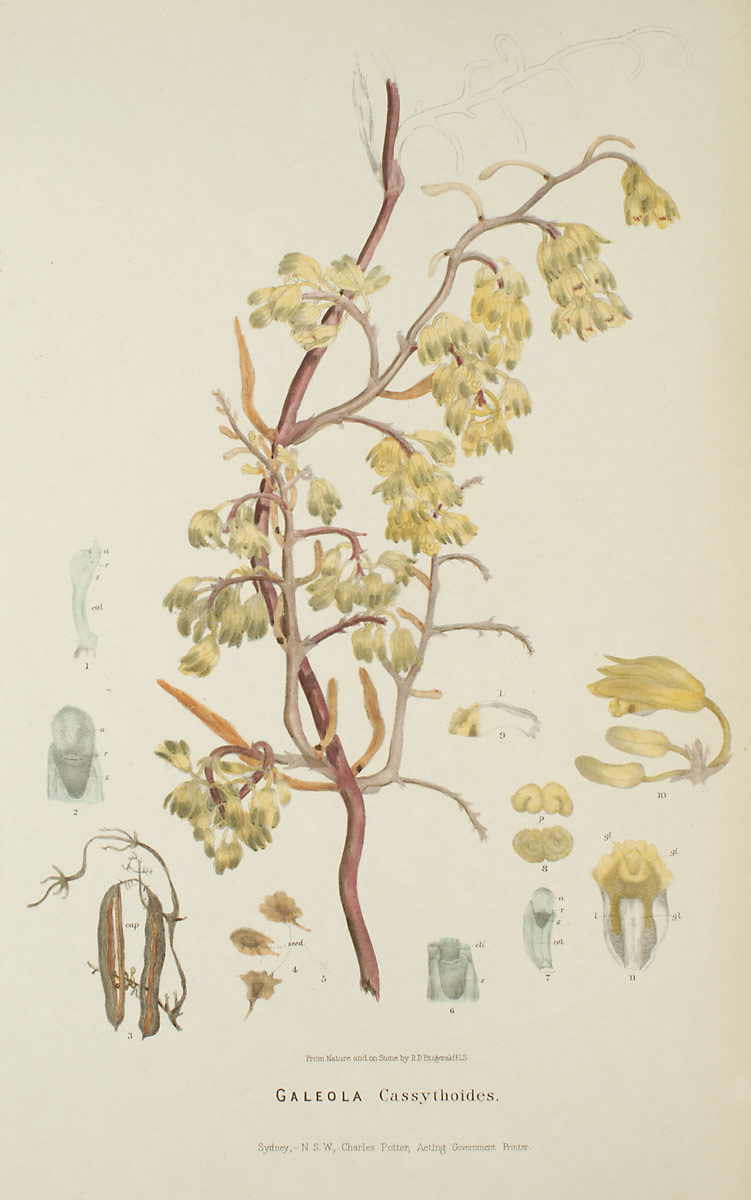
- Illustration of E. cassythoides in Robert Fitgerald's book Australian Orchids

Scientific classification
- Kingdom: Plantae
- Clade: Tracheophytes
- Clade: Angiosperms
- Clade: Monocots
- Order: Asparagales
- Family: Orchidaceae
- Subfamily: Vanilloideae
- Tribe: Vanilleae
- Genus: Erythrorchis; Blume

Synonyms
- Ledgeria F.Muell.

= Erythrorchis =

Bootlace orchids

Genus of orchids

Erythrorchis, commonly known as bootlace orchids or as 倒吊兰属 (dao diao lan shu), is a genus of two species of climbing, leafless orchids in the family Orchidaceae. Orchids in this genus are climbing or scrambling vines that cling by small roots, usually climbing on tree trunks. Many-branched flowering stems bear many densely crowded flowers.

== Description ==
Orchids in the genus Erythrorchis are leafless myco-heterotrophic, climbing herbs that cling to surfaces with small, unbranched roots from the main stems. They usually cling to tree trunks. Densely crowded, resupinate flowers are borne on a highly branched flowering stem. The sepals and petals are fleshy, often fused to each other and spread widely, the petals narrower than the sepals. The labellum is relatively wide and has crinkled edges and closely surrounds the column. The fruit are long, thin capsules.

== Taxonomy and naming ==
The genus Erythrorchis was first formally described in 1837 by Carl Ludwig Blume and published in his book Rumphia. The name Erythrorchis is derived from the Ancient Greek words erythros meaning "red" and orchis meaning "testicle" or "orchid".

The two species are-

- Erythrorchis altissima (Blume) Blume - Hainan, Taiwan, Cambodia, Assam, Indonesia, Ryukyu Islands, Laos, Malaysia, Myanmar, Philippines, Thailand, Vietnam;
- Erythrorchis cassythoides (R.Cunn. ex Lindl.) Garay - Queensland, New South Wales.

== See also ==
- List of Orchidaceae genera
