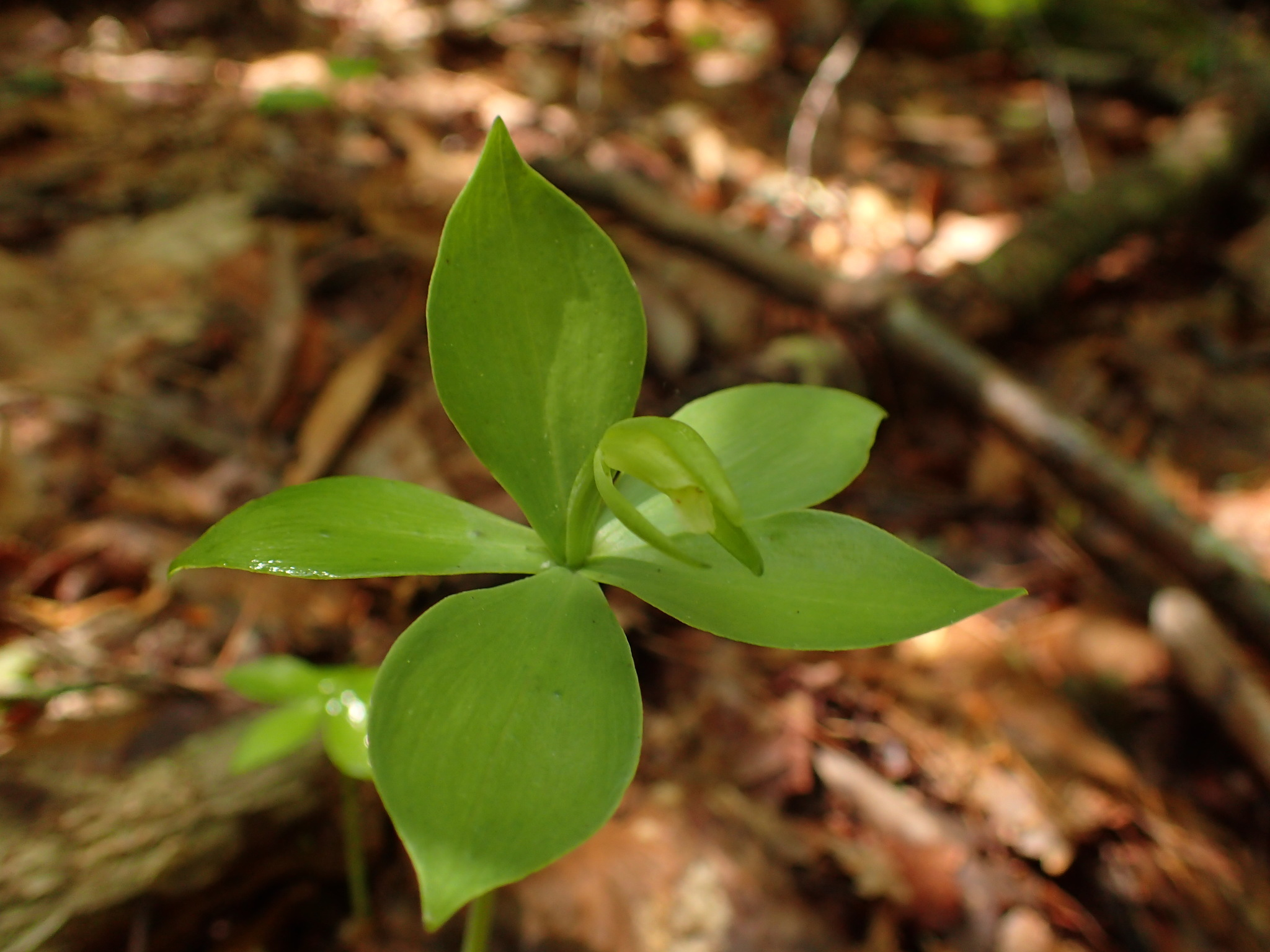
- Isotria medeoloides

Scientific classification
- Kingdom: Plantae
- Clade: Tracheophytes
- Clade: Angiosperms
- Clade: Monocots
- Order: Asparagales
- Family: Orchidaceae
- Subfamily: Vanilloideae
- Tribe: Pogonieae
- Genus: Isotria; Raf.

Species
- Isotria medeoloides (Pursh) Raf. Isotria verticillata (Muhl. ex Willd.) Raf.

Synonyms
- Odonectis Raf.

= Isotria =

Genus of orchids

Isotria (fiveleaf orchid) is a genus of flowering plants from the orchid family, Orchidaceae.

== Description ==
Isotria species are small perennial herbs with thin, hairy underground rhizomes. The erect, hollow shoots typically bear five leaves in a whorl, coated slightly bluish, widest above the middle, and pointed at the ends. The terminal inflorescence usually holds one, occasionally two flowers. Flowers are resupinate, with white, greenish, or reddish-brown bracts. The hermaphrodite, zygomorphic, tripartite flowers have three unfused, lanceolate sepals and smaller petals that point forward, forming a flower tube above the column. The free lip is three-lobed with wavy edges and fleshy calluses. The slender white column bears two glands at the base and the stamen at the end, surrounded by column tissue ending in irregular teeth. The stamen is bent down relative to the column axis, with two smooth, broad appendages on the sides, containing loose pollen grains in four pollen chambers (pollina). The upright capsule fruit contains numerous spindle-shaped seeds, approximately 1.2 × 0.2 millimeters in size. Chromosome count is 2n = 18.

== Species ==
The genus has two known species, both native to eastern North America.

Image	Name	Distribution	Elevation (m)
	Isotria medeoloides (Pursh) Raf.	eastern North America from New England south along the Appalachian Mountains to Georgia and Tennessee. Isolated populations in Missouri, Illinois, Michigan, Ohio, and Ontario.	30–1,000 metres (98–3,281 ft)
	Isotria verticillata (Muhl. ex Willd.) Raf.	eastern and central North America from Maine to eastern Texas, north into the Ohio Valley and Great Lakes region.	10–2,000 metres (33–6,562 ft)
