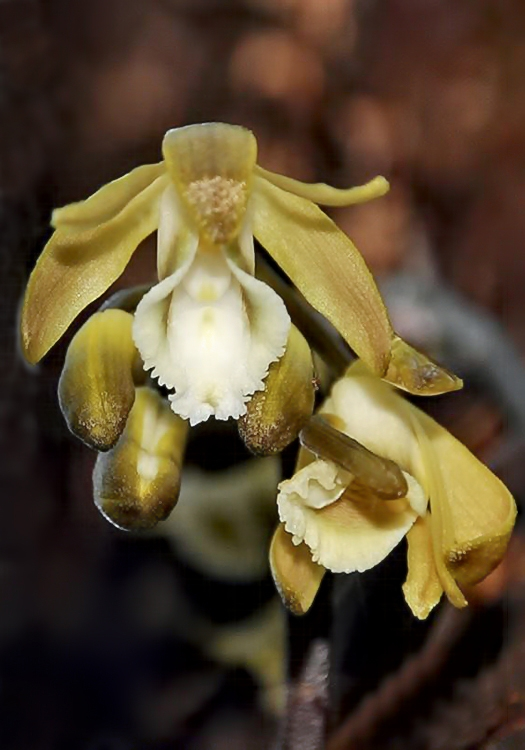

Scientific classification
- Kingdom: Plantae
- Clade: Tracheophytes
- Clade: Angiosperms
- Clade: Monocots
- Order: Asparagales
- Family: Orchidaceae
- Subfamily: Vanilloideae
- Genus: Erythrorchis
- Species: E. cassythoides

Binomial name
- Erythrorchis cassythoides (R.Cunn.) Garay

Synonyms
- Dendrobium cassythoides R.Cunn.; Erythrorchis aphylla F.Muell. nom. inval., pro syn.; Galeola cassythoides (R.Cunn.) Rchb.f.; Ledgeria aphylla F.Muell.; Galeola altissima auct. non (Blume) Rchb.f.: Reichenbach, H.G. (1871)

= Erythrorchis cassythoides =

Black bootlace orchid

Species of orchid

Erythrorchis cassythoides, commonly known as the black bootlace orchid, is a leafless climbing orchid in the family Orchidaceae. It has long, dark brown to blackish stems and groups of up to thirty yellowish to greenish, sweetly scented flowers and is endemic to eastern Australia.

== Description ==
Erythrorchis cassythoides is a leafless, climbing, myco-heterotrophic herb that has thin, wiry, dark brown to blackish stems up to 5 m (20 ft) long and branching groups of flowers with between ten and thirty resupinate flowers. The groups of flowers are 80–150 mm (3–6 in) long, each flower yellow to greenish and 20–25 mm (0.8–1 in) wide. The sepals and petals are 11–18 mm (0.4–0.7 in) long and 2–4 mm (0.08–0.2 in) wide with the lateral sepals and petals curved and spreading apart from each other. The labellum is white, 9–12 mm (0.4–0.5 in) long, 4–7 mm (0.16–0.28 in) wide with wavy or crinkled edges but has brown or reddish streaks as it ages. There is a callus consisting of a hairy plate and two round ridges in the centre of the labellum. Flowering occurs from August to December and is followed by the fruit which is a capsule 60–200 mm (2–8 in) long and 8–15 mm (0.3–0.6 in) wide.

== Taxonomy and naming ==
The black bootlace orchid was first formally described by Richard Cunningham who sent a specimen and hand-written description to his brother Allan, giving the plant the name Dendrobium cassythoides. Allan Cunningham, in turn sent the description to John Lindley who published it in Edwards's Botanical Register. In 1986, Leslie Andrew Garay changed the name to Erythrorchis cassythoides.

In the note to his brother, Richard Cunningham wrote that he had called the plant "Cassythoides, from the prima facie resemblance it has to the genus Cassytha, not only in its leafless character and short racemes of flowers, but in its peculiar bronze or japanned papulose stems - it may be found, that it also resembles it in its climbing propensities."

John Lindley noted "It is not a little remarkable that so highly curious a plant as this should so long have been over looked, although a native of a locality which, as Mr. Allan Cunningham remarks, has doubtless been traversed by Botanists of many countries in Europe, who have visited Port Jackson in ships of discovery since the Colony was founded in January 1788, viz., French, Spanish, German, Swedish, Russian, &c., besides many of our own countrymen."

== Distribution and habitat ==
Erythrorchis cassythoides grows in forest on eucalypts, stumps and logs in near-coastal areas and nearby tablelands between the Blackdown Tableland in Queensland and Waterfall in the Royal National Park, New South Wales.
