= Clematepistephium =

Conservation status
- Least Concern (IUCN 3.1)
- CITES Appendix II

Scientific classification
- Kingdom: Plantae
- Clade: Tracheophytes
- Clade: Angiosperms
- Clade: Monocots
- Order: Asparagales
- Family: Orchidaceae
- Subfamily: Vanilloideae
- Tribe: Vanilleae
- Genus: Clematepistephium; N.Hallé
- Species: C. smilacifolium

Binomial name
- Clematepistephium smilacifolium (Rchb.f.) N.Hallé

Synonyms
- Epistephium smilacifolium Rchb.f.

Genus of orchids

Clematepistephium is a monotypic genus of orchids containing only one known species, Clematepistephium smilacifolium, endemic to the island of New Caledonia. Its closest relative is Eriaxis, also endemic to New Caledonia.

== See also ==
- List of Orchidaceae genera
