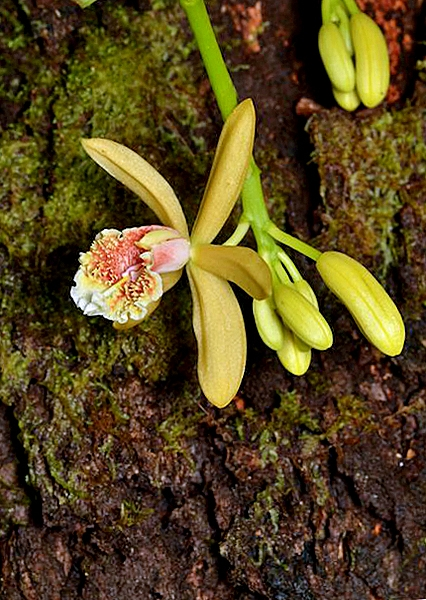

Conservation status
- Special Least Concern (NCA)

Scientific classification
- Kingdom: Plantae
- Clade: Embryophytes
- Clade: Tracheophytes
- Clade: Spermatophytes
- Clade: Angiosperms
- Clade: Monocots
- Order: Asparagales
- Family: Orchidaceae
- Subfamily: Vanilloideae
- Genus: Pseudovanilla
- Species: P. foliata

Binomial name
- Pseudovanilla foliata Garay

Synonyms
- Ledgeria foliata F.Muell.; Galeola foliata (F.Muell.) F.Muell.; Erythrorchis foliata F.Muell. nom. inval.; Galeola altissima F.Muell.; Galeola ledgeri F.Muell. ex Fitzg.; Galeola vanilloides Schltr.; Pseudovanilla vanilloides (Schltr.) Garay

= Pseudovanilla foliata =

Great climbing orchid

Species of orchid

Pseudovanilla foliata, commonly known as the great climbing orchid, is a plant in the orchid family native to Australia (Queensland and New South Wales) and New Guinea. It is a terrestrial orchid with a vining vegetative habit, climbing by means of adventitious roots produced at nodes. Its leaves are reduced, and the species is considered to be at least partially mycoheterotrophic.

== Description ==
Pseudovanilla foliata is a terrestrial, perennial, entirely glabrous vine. Its yellow-green stem may be up to 0.9 cm (0.35 in) in diameter and 15 m (49 ft) in length; it is flexuose and terete. Adventitious roots (roots that arise from the stem), which are thinly elongated and flexuose, extend from the nodes and are always accompanied by an opposite bract, a useful distinguishing feature. The leaves, sparsely interspersed between nodes, are elliptical, acute or subacute and slightly fleshy, up to 8 cm (3.1 in) in length and 2.5 cm (0.98 in) in width.

P. foliata bears a lax but highly branching inflorescence with 4 to 8 flowers at the apex of each offshoot. The rachis is slightly swollen, and the floral bracts are minute and triangular. The flowers have yellow sepals and petals, as well as a ruffled white labellum with orange to pink markings. The sepals are oblong to strap-shaped and obtuse, 2.6 cm (1.0 in) in length and 0.6 cm (0.24 in) in width. The petals are narrow, slightly curved and strap-shaped, with the mid-vein on outside thickened; they are as long as the sepals and 0.4 cm (0.16 in) wide. The lip, 2.1 cm (0.83 in) in length and 1.6 cm (0.63 in) in width, is broadly elliptic, with its base adnate (fused) to the column. Near its apex (tip), the lip is vaguely 3-lobed with undulate margins; the lateral lobes are bluntly rounded, and the mid-lobe is shaped like a semicircle, indistinctly notched. The surface of the lip is covered with irregular protuberances and in the basal half with rather long obtuse warts. The callus is keeled and extends from the base of the lip to the middle.

The column of the flowers, 1 cm (0.39 in) long, is roughly cylindrical, slender, and gradually slightly dilated towards the apex; the clinandrium is slightly scalloped. The anther is square-hooded and in front slightly notched. The ovary is cylindrical and around 1 cm (0.39 in) long. The seed capsules are 15–25 cm (5.9–9.8 in) long and 4–5 cm (1.6–2.0 in) in diameter. P. foliata flowers from October to January.

== Taxonomy and naming ==
The great climbing orchid was first formally described in 1861 by Ferdinand von Mueller, who gave it the name Ledgeria foliata and published the description in Fragmenta Phytographiae Australiae. Mueller then renamed it to Galeola foliata in 1873. In 1986, Leslie Andrew Garay published it under its currently accepted name, Pseudovanilla foliata.

== Distribution and habitat ==
Pseudovanilla foliata is found in Queensland as far north as Cape York Peninsula, as well as in the northeast and central east. Its southernmost distribution reaches coastal central New South Wales, and populations also exist in New Guinea. The plant has been found at elevations ranging from sea level to 1,000 m (3,000 ft) in well-developed lowland and upland rainforest, often growing on live trunks or rotting wood in old stumps, logs, etc.

== Ecology ==
Pseudovanilla foliata is capable only of limited photosynthesis in its stems and bracts and relies heavily on mycoheterotrophic sources of nutrition by parasitizing fungi in decaying wood. Its seeds germinate on decomposing fallen wood, and as such, plants are usually found in areas following ecological disturbance, such as forests impacted by cyclones or logging. Though P. foliata can massively proliferate on fallen wood, its heavy dependence on decomposing fungi results in its eventual decline as the timber disintegrates. P. foliata is pollinated by small native bees.

== Conservation ==
Pseudovanilla foliata is classified as "special least concern" by the Queensland Government in the Nature Conservation Act 1992.
