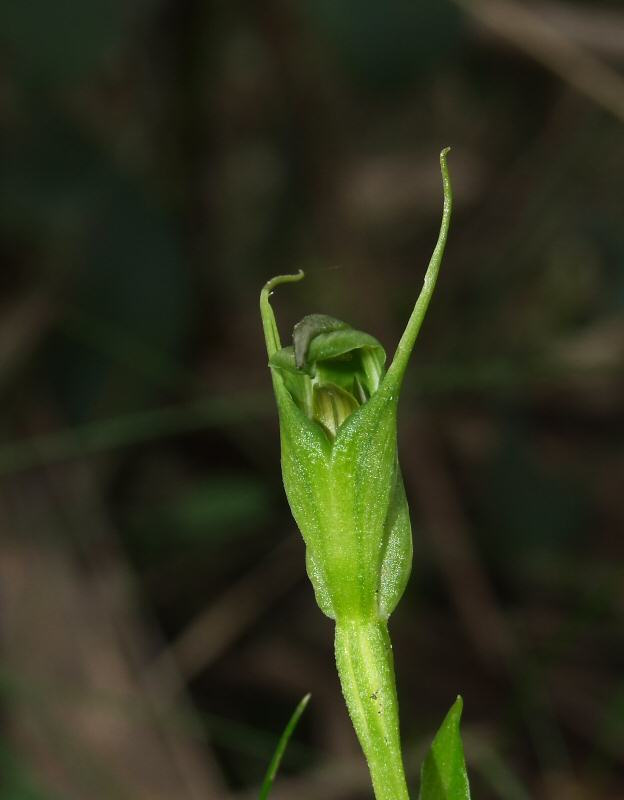
- Pterostylis foliata growing near Anglesea

Scientific classification
- Kingdom: Plantae
- Clade: Tracheophytes
- Clade: Angiosperms
- Clade: Monocots
- Order: Asparagales
- Family: Orchidaceae
- Subfamily: Orchidoideae
- Tribe: Cranichideae
- Genus: Pterostylis
- Species: P. foliata

Binomial name
- Pterostylis foliata Hook.f.

= Pterostylis foliata =

Slender greenhood

Species of orchid

Pterostylis foliata, commonly known as the slender greenhood, is a species of orchid widespread in south-eastern Australia and New Zealand. Flowering plants have a rosette of three to six, dark green, crinkled leaves crowded around the flowering stem and a single dark green and brown flower with a deep V-shaped sinus between the lateral sepals.

== Description ==
Pterostylis foliata is a terrestrial, perennial, deciduous, herb with an underground tuber. Flowering plants have a rosette of between three and six dark green, crinkled leaves crowded around the base of the flowering stem, each leaf 30–80 mm long and 10–16 mm wide. A single flower 17–20 mm long and 7–9 mm wide is borne on a spike 120–300 mm high. The flowers are dark green and brown. The dorsal sepal and petals are fused, forming a hood or "galea" over the column but the dorsal sepal is longer than the petals and has a sharp point on its end. The lateral sepals are erect and in contact with the galea, and there is a deep, V-shaped sinus between the lateral sepals. The labellum is 12–15 mm long, 2–3 mm wide, brown and blunt and protrudes above the sinus. Flowering occurs from August to January.

== Taxonomy and naming ==
Pterostylis foliata was first formally described in 1853 by Joseph Dalton Hooker from a specimen collected in the Ruahine Mountains on the North Island of New Zealand. The description was published in Flora Novae-Zelandiae. The specific epithet (foliata) is a Latin word meaning "leafy".

== Distribution and habitat ==
The slender greenhood usually grows in moist, grassy forest in shady places. It is widespread but uncommon in New South Wales south from near Batlow, in Victoria, south-eastern South Australia, Tasmania and both islands of New Zealand.
