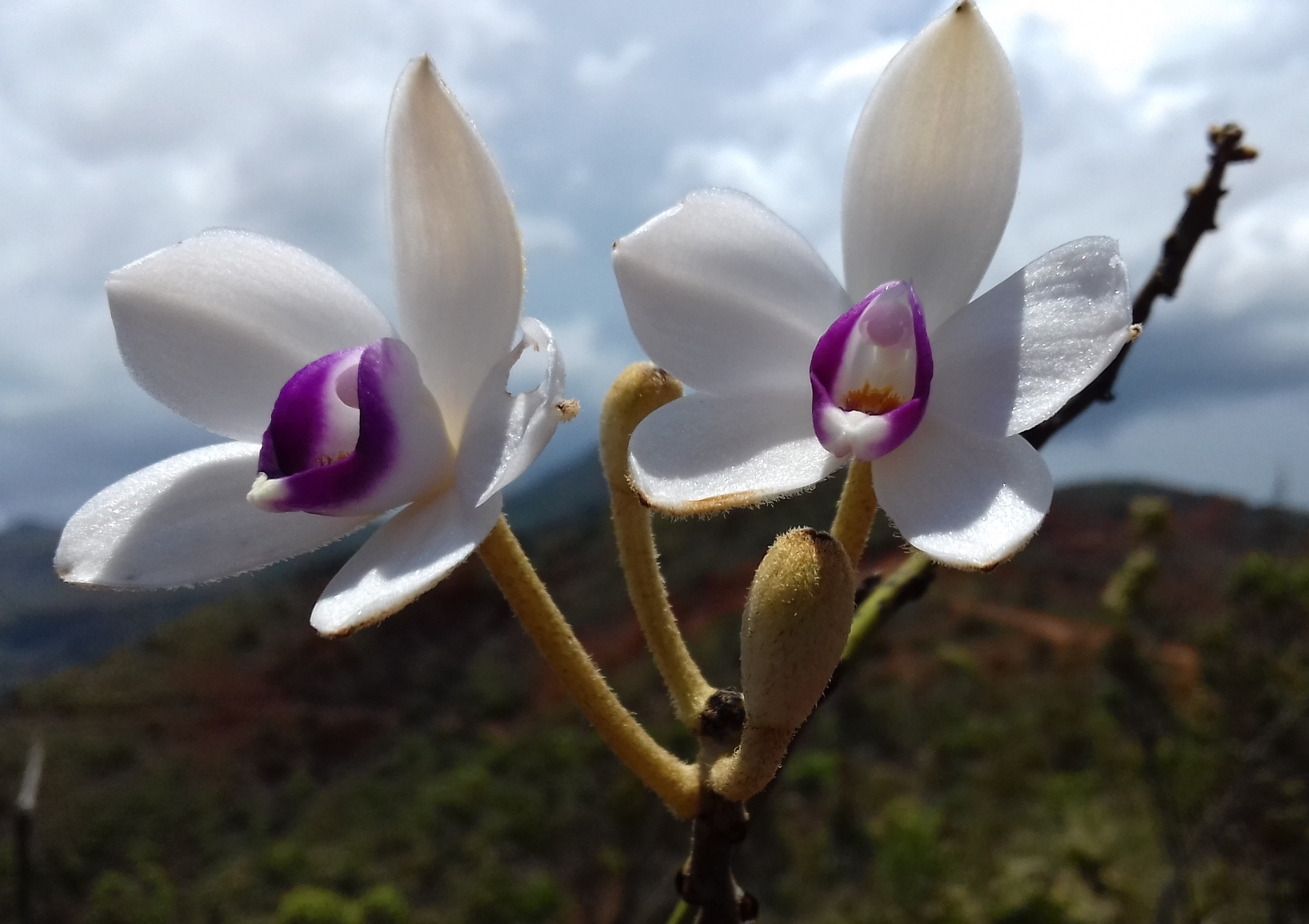
- E. rigida flowers photographed at Blue River Provincial Park, New Caledonia

Conservation status
- Least Concern (IUCN 3.1)
- CITES Appendix II (CITES)

Scientific classification
- Kingdom: Plantae
- Clade: Tracheophytes
- Clade: Angiosperms
- Clade: Monocots
- Order: Asparagales
- Family: Orchidaceae
- Subfamily: Vanilloideae
- Tribe: Vanilleae
- Genus: Eriaxis; Rchb.f.
- Species: E. rigida

Binomial name
- Eriaxis rigida Rchb.f.

Synonyms
- Galeola rigida (Rchb.f.) Benth. & Hook.f.; Epistephium regis-alberti Kraenzl.

= Eriaxis =

Genus of orchids

Eriaxis is a monotypic genus of orchids in the subfamily Vanilloideae. The sole species is Eriaxis rigida, endemic to New Caledonia. Its closest relative is Clematepistephium, also endemic to New Caledonia.

== Distribution and habitat ==
Eriaxis rigida is known only from New Caledonia. It is widespread on the main island of Grande Terre, but also occurs on the Belep Islands in the north and the Isle of Pines in the south. It grows in metal-rich, nutrient poor soils in humid forests and maquis shrubland at altitudes from sea level up to 1,000 m (3,300 ft).
