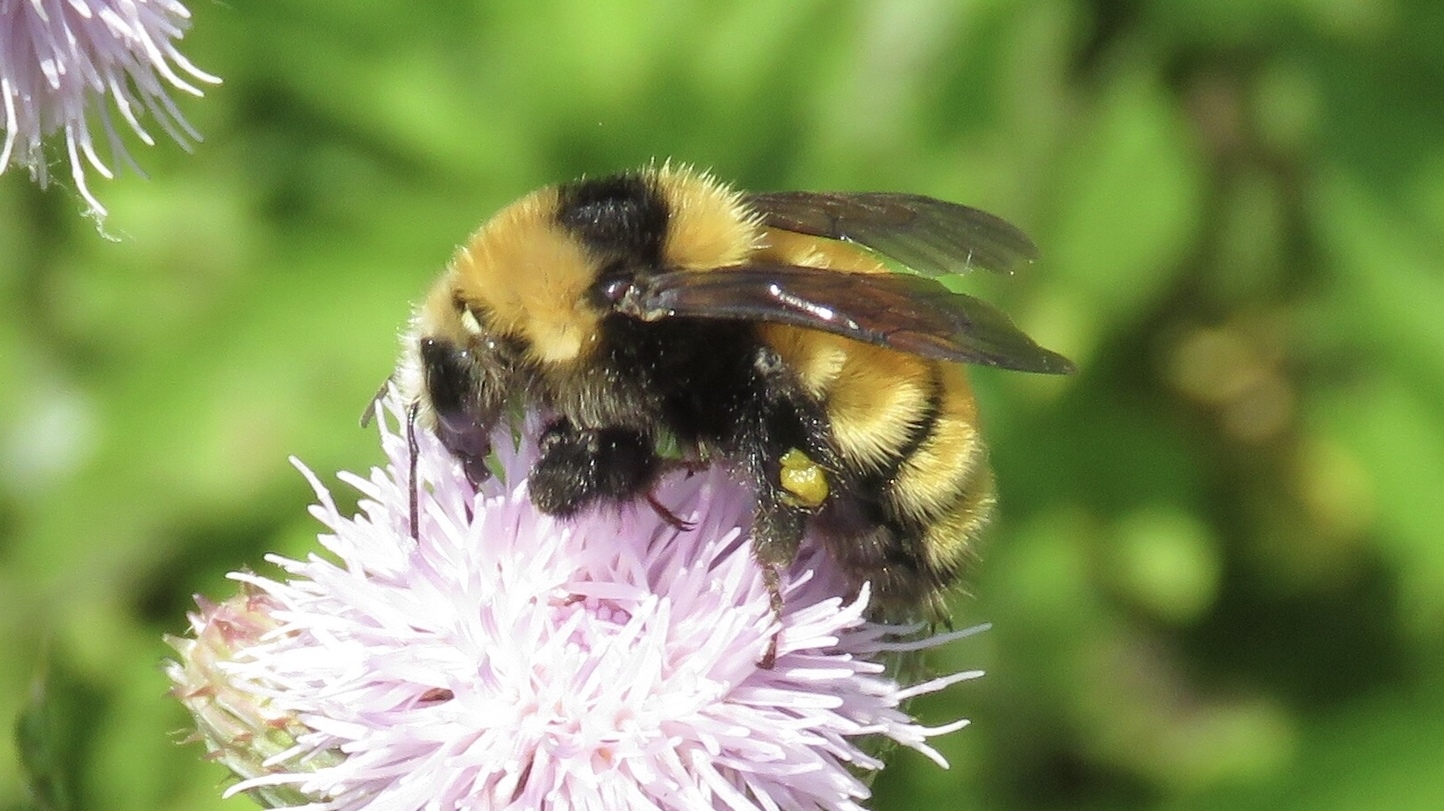

Conservation status
- Least Concern (IUCN 3.1)

Scientific classification
- Domain: Eukaryota
- Kingdom: Animalia
- Phylum: Arthropoda
- Class: Insecta
- Order: Hymenoptera
- Family: Apidae
- Genus: Bombus
- Subgenus: Subterraneobombus
- Species: B. borealis

Binomial name
- Bombus borealis Kirby, 1837

= Bombus borealis =

Species of bee

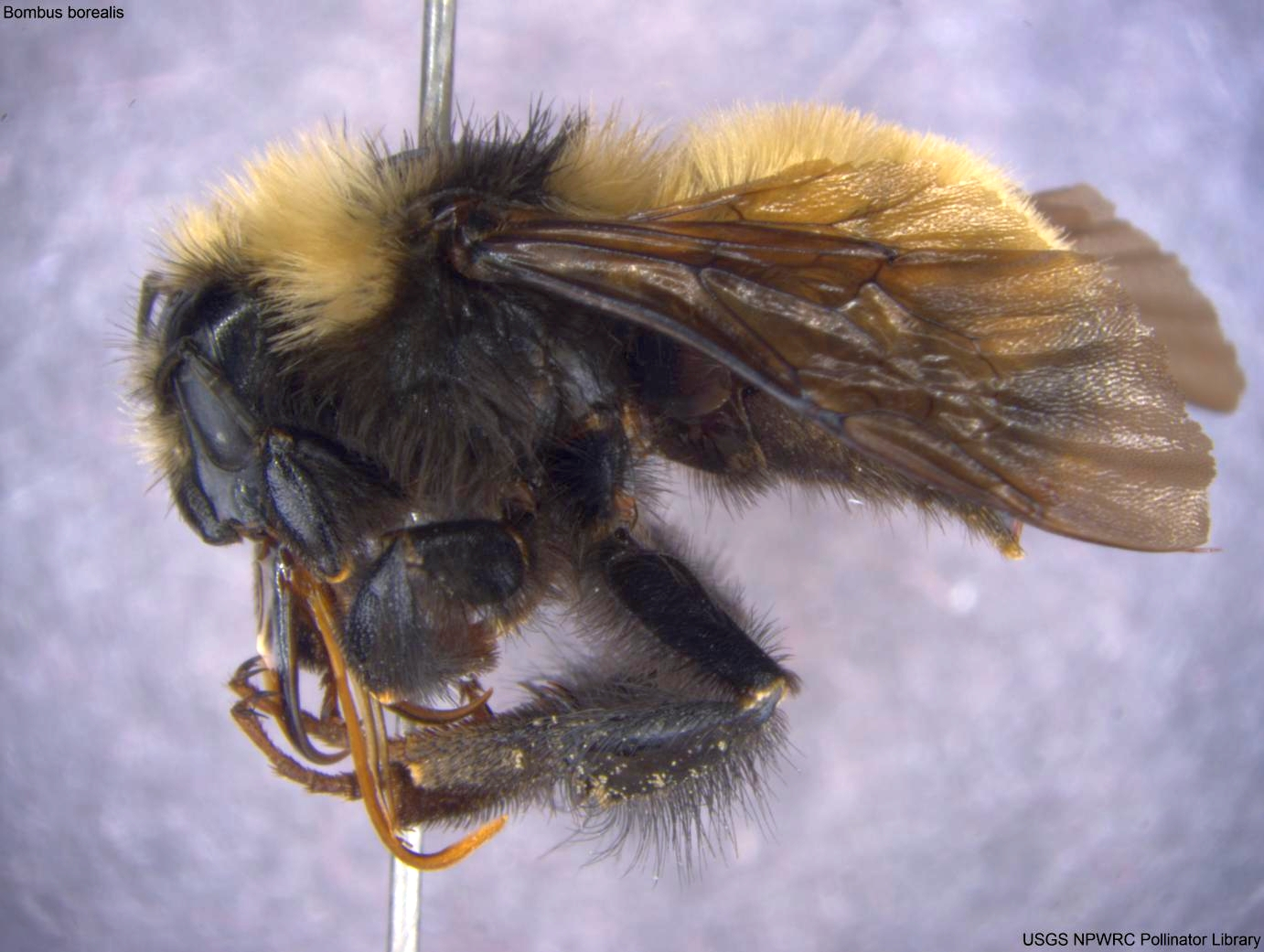
Pinned specimen

Bombus borealis is a species of bumblebee known commonly as the northern amber bumblebee. It is native to northern North America, where it occurs across Canada and Alaska and the northern and eastern contiguous United States.

The queen is 1.8 to 2.2 centimeters long. It has yellow hairs on the body and pale to white hairs on the head. The worker is similar in coloration and measures 1.3 centimeters in length. The male is 1.4 to 1.7 centimeters long.

This species is generally found in woodland habitat. It usually nests underground, and males congregate nearby to seek mates. This species feeds on several plant taxa, including milkvetches, thistles, wild blackberries, goldenrods, comfrey, clovers, and vetches.
