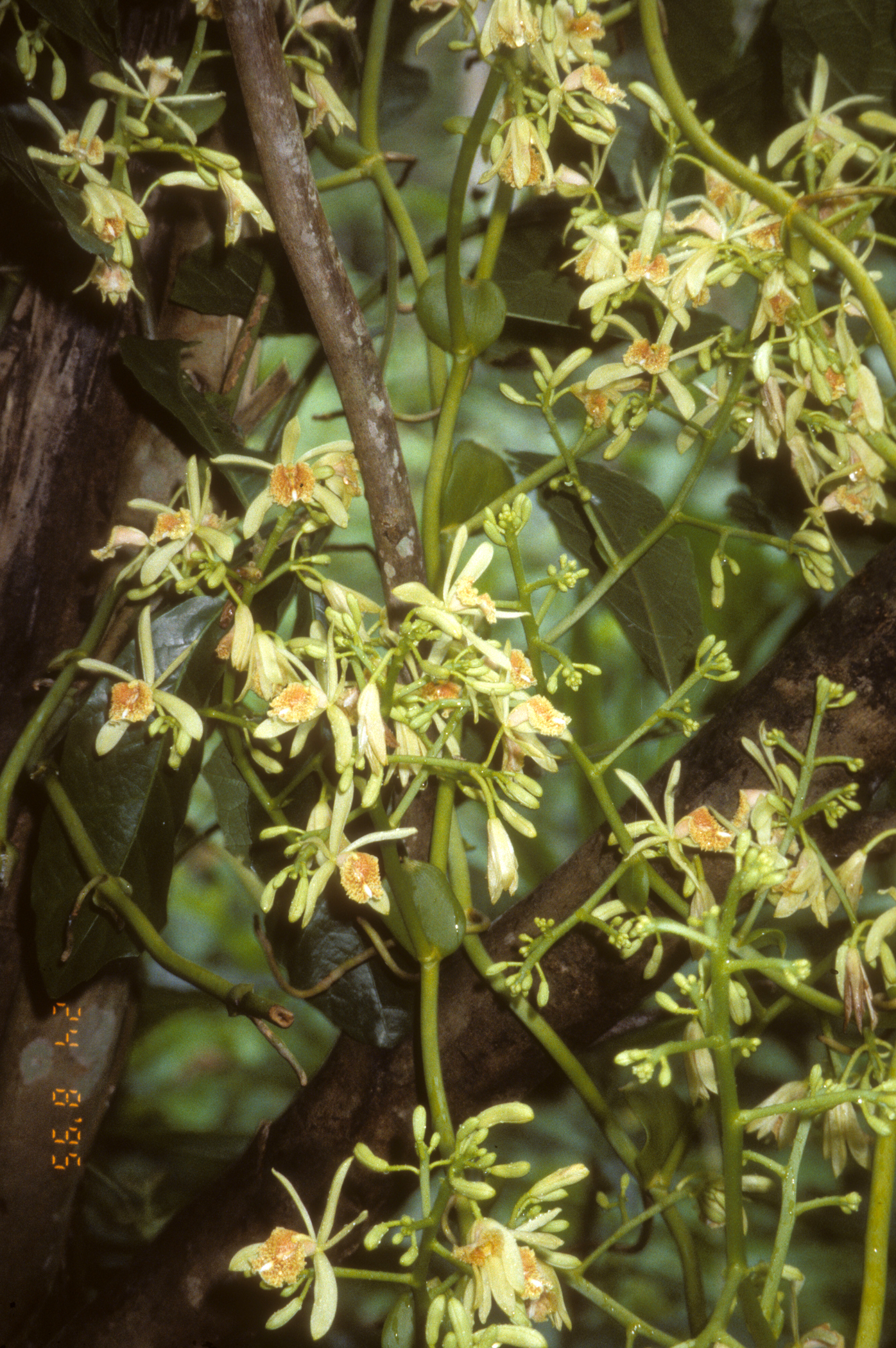
- Pseudovanilla foliata

Scientific classification
- Kingdom: Plantae
- Clade: Embryophytes
- Clade: Tracheophytes
- Clade: Spermatophytes
- Clade: Angiosperms
- Clade: Monocots
- Order: Asparagales
- Family: Orchidaceae
- Subfamily: Vanilloideae
- Tribe: Vanilleae
- Genus: Pseudovanilla; Garay

Type species
- Ledgeria foliata F.Muell.

= Pseudovanilla =

Giant climbing orchid

Genus of orchids

Pseudovanilla, commonly known as giant climbing orchids, is a genus of eight climbing orchids in the family Orchidaceae. Orchids in this genus have tall climbing stems with clinging roots, leaf-like bracts and branching flowering stems with colourful, spreading sepals and petals. Species in the genus are native to Indonesia, the Philippines, New Guinea, Australia, Solomons, Micronesia and Fiji.

The genus was first formally described in 1986 by Leslie Andrew Garay in Botanical Museum Leaflets, the name Pseudovanilla meaning "false vanilla", a "reference to the casual similarity of the plants to both genera". Garay nominated Ledgeria foliata (now Pseudovanilla foliata as the type species.

== List of species ==
The following is a list of species of Pseudovanilla recognised by the Plants of the World Online as at April 2024:

- Pseudovanilla affinis (J.J.Sm.) Garay (1986) - Java
- Pseudovanilla anomala (Ames & L.O.Williams) Garay (1986) - Fiji
- Pseudovanilla foliata (F.Muell.) Garay (1986) - Queensland, New South Wales, New Guinea
- Pseudovanilla gracilis (Schltr.) Garay (1986) - New Guinea, Solomon Islands
- Pseudovanilla montigena (Schltr.) Ormerod (2001) - New Guinea
- Pseudovanilla philippinensis (Ames) Garay (1986) - Luzon
- Pseudovanilla ponapensis (Kaneh. & Yamam.) Garay (1986) - Pohnpei
- Pseudovanilla ternatensis (J.J.Sm.) Garay (1986) - Ternate Island
