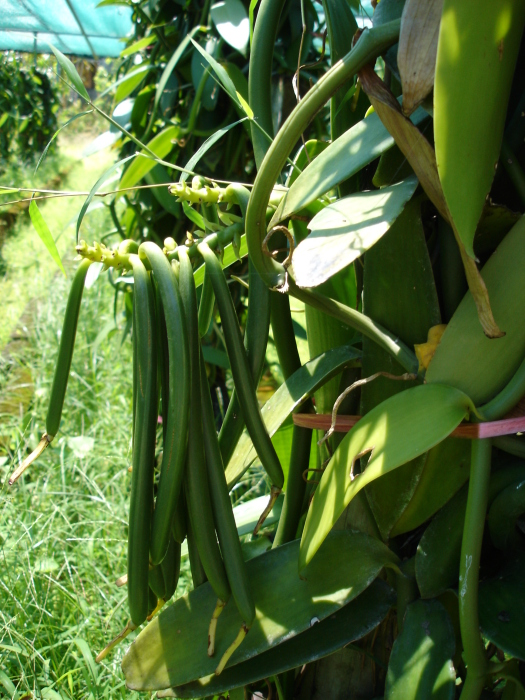
- Vanilla planifolia

Scientific classification
- Kingdom: Plantae
- Clade: Tracheophytes
- Clade: Angiosperms
- Clade: Monocots
- Order: Asparagales
- Family: Orchidaceae
- Subfamily: Vanilloideae (Lindley) Szlachetko

Tribes
- Pogonieae; Vanilleae

= Vanilloideae =

Subfamily of orchids

Vanilloideae is one of the subfamilies of orchids belonging to the large family Orchidaceae.

Lindley (1836) and Garay (1986) treated it as a separate family, Vanillaceae. But their single, incumbent anther and poorly organised pollinia led to their recognition as at best a subgroup of monandrous orchids. From a molecular point of view, this clade is rather a sister to subfamily Epidendroideae and subfamily Orchidoideae in the Orchidaceae, and thus it is today also considered a subfamily.

The subfamily Vanilloideae consists of 15 genera and about 180 species, belonging to the tribes Pogonieae and Vanilleae.

Their distribution is pantropical, throughout Asia, Australia and the Americas.

The species in the tribe Pogonieae have a characteristic laciniate lip margin. The color of their petals and sepals is pink or rarely white or bluish. Their sepals have an oblong, elliptic, or narrowly lanceolate form.

The species in the tribe Vanilleae are long plants characterized by long, thick, succulent vines and a lip without spur.

== Classification ==
Tribe Pogonieae (77 species)

- Genera : Cleistes, Cleistesiopsis, Duckeella, Isotria, and Pogonia

Tribe Vanilleae (172 species)

- Genera : Clematepistephium, Cyrtosia, Epistephium, Eriaxis, Erythrorchis, Galeola, Lecanorchis, Pseudovanilla and Vanilla.
