= List of Vanilla species =

This is a list of accepted species of Vanilla (vanilla orchids), according to the most recent taxonomic research. However, molecular phylogeny is still needed to support these findings as some morphological variations might be influenced by the local environment.

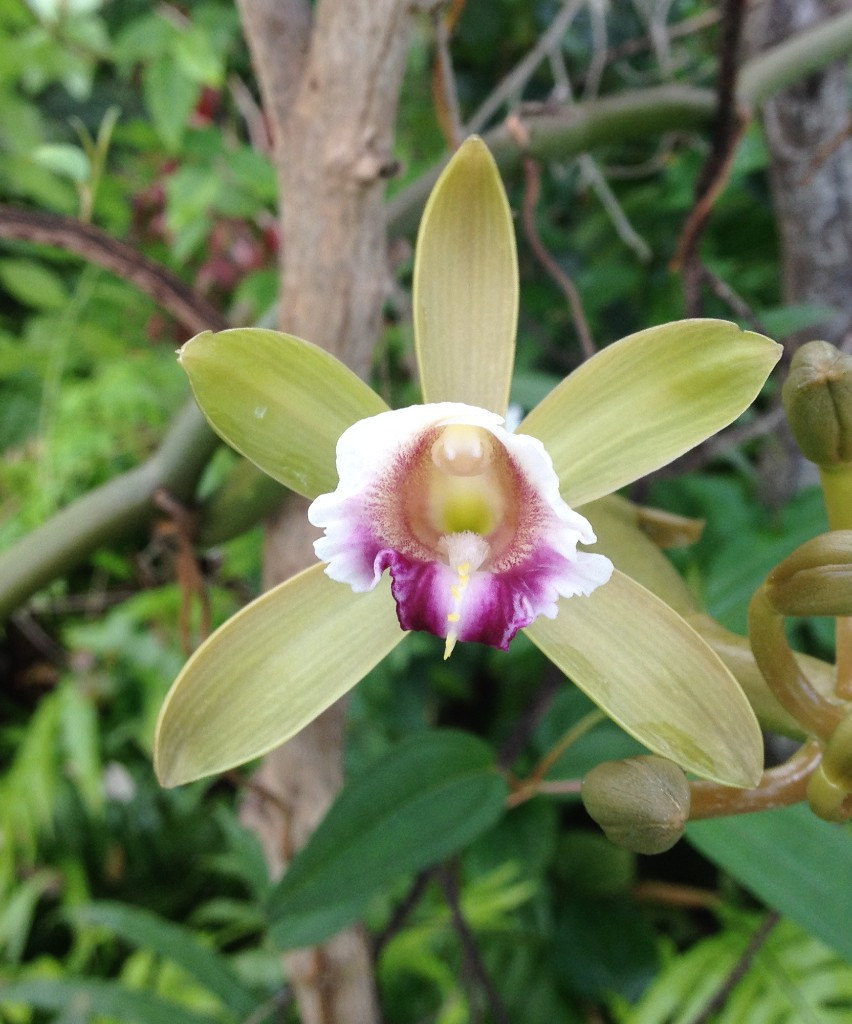
Vanilla barbellata

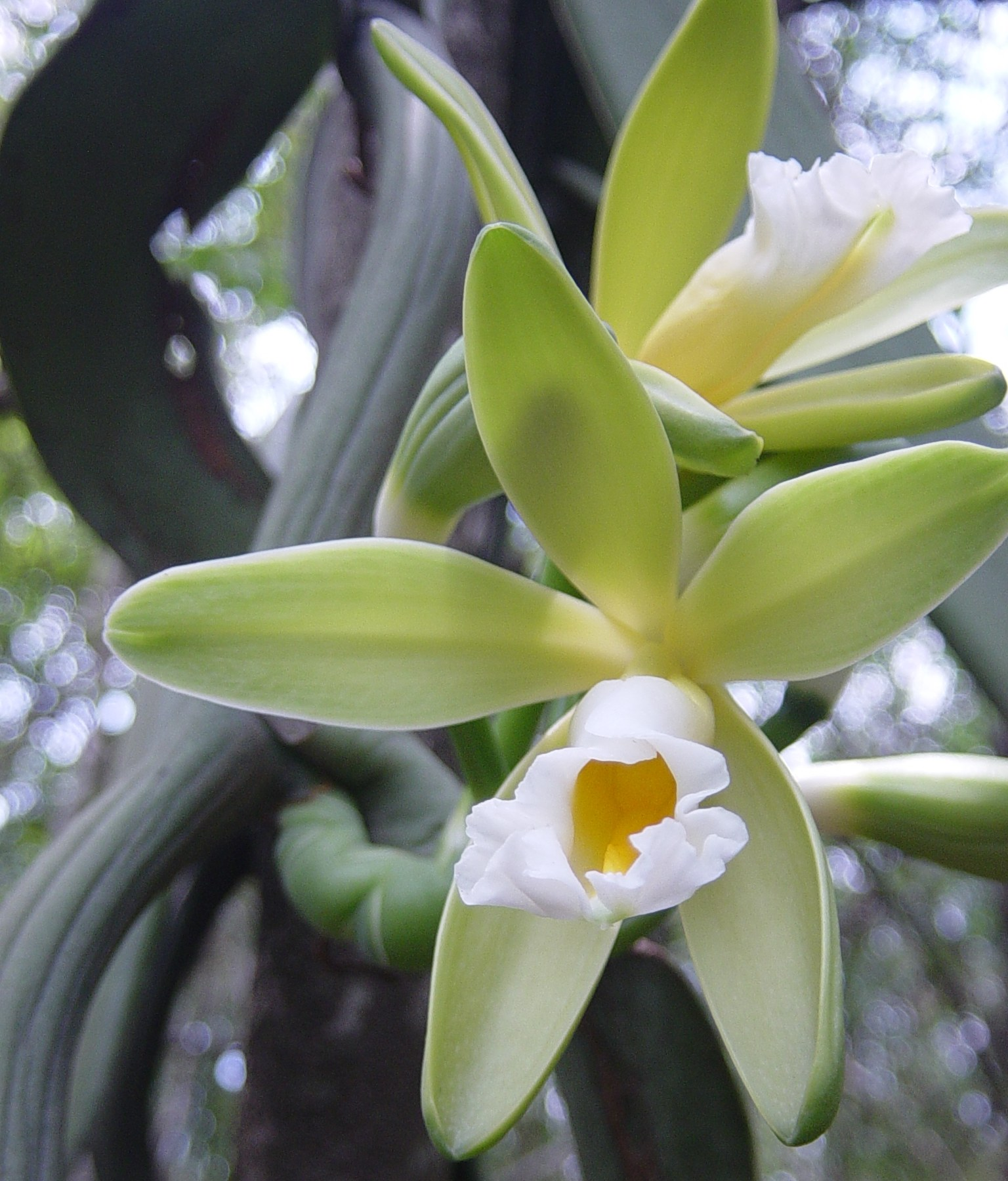
Vanilla chamissonis

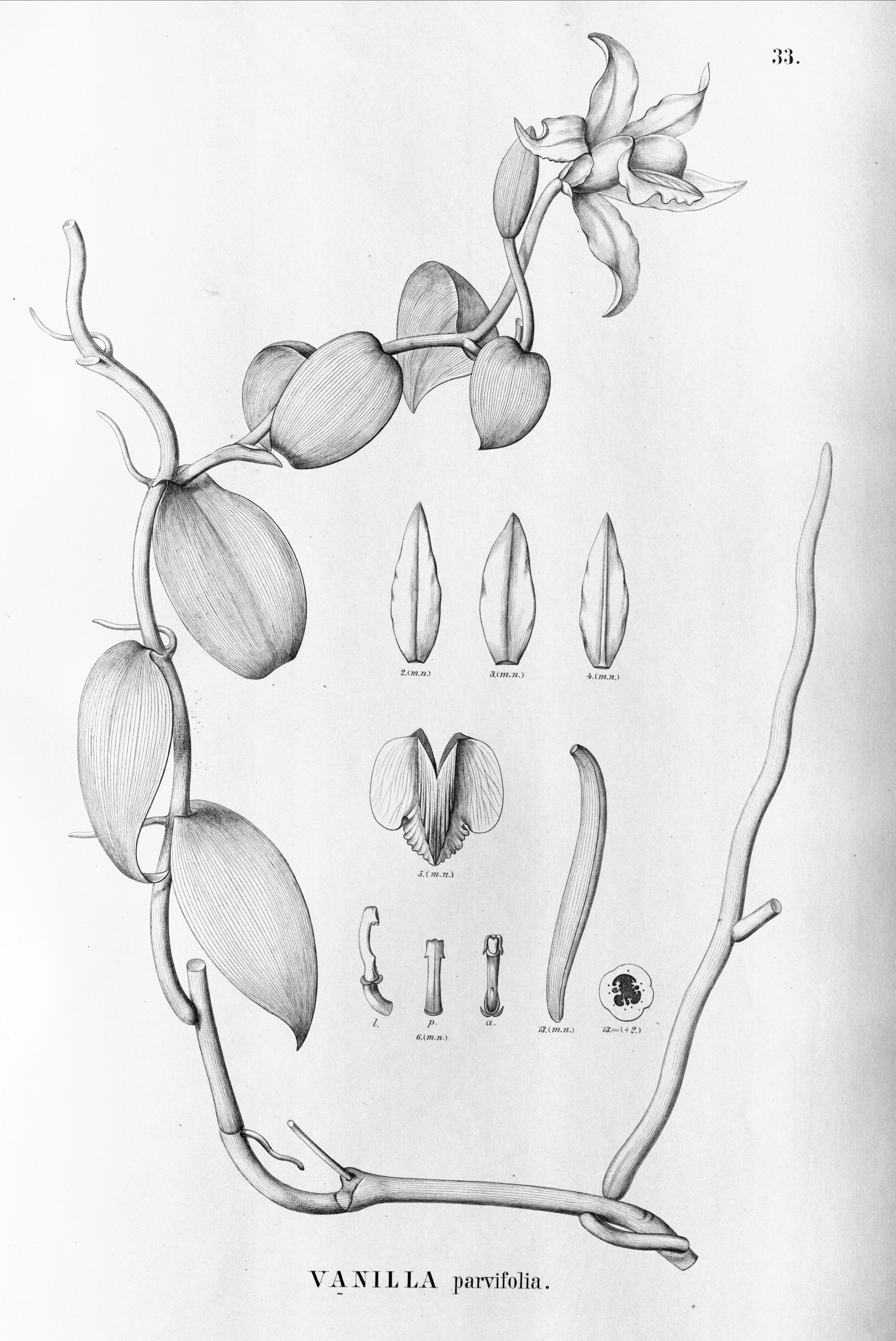
Vanilla parvifolia illustration circa 1895 from "Flora Brasiliensis"

- Vanilla abundiflora (Borneo)
- Vanilla acuminata (Gabon)
- Vanilla africana (W & WC Tropical Africa)
- Vanilla albida (Indonesia)
- Vanilla andamanica (Andaman Islands)
- Vanilla angustipetala (Brazil, Paraguay, Argentina)
- Vanilla annamica (S China to Vietnam)
- Vanilla aphylla (SE Asia to Java)
- Vanilla appendiculata (Guyana, Surinam, Brazil, Peru)
- Vanilla bahiana (Brazil: Bahia)
- Vanilla barbellata (S Florida through Caribbean)
- Vanilla bertoniensis (Paraguay)
- Vanilla bicolor (Caribbean to N South America)
- Vanilla borneensis (NE India, Thailand, Malaysia, Indonesia:Borneo)
- Vanilla bradei (Brazil: São Paulo)
- Vanilla calopogon (Philippines: Luzon)
- Vanilla calyculata (Honduras, El Salvador, Colombia)
- Vanilla chalottii (Gabon)
- Vanilla chamissonis (Brazil)
- Vanilla claviculata (Caribbean)
- Vanilla columbiana (Colombia)
- Vanilla coursii (Madagascar)
- Vanilla crenulata (W & WC Tropical Africa)
- Vanilla cristagalli (N Brazil)
- Vanilla cucullata (Cameroon)
- Vanilla decaryana (SW Madagascar)
- Vanilla diabolica (Indonesia: Sulawesi)
- Vanilla dilloniana (S Florida to Caribbean)
- Vanilla dubia (Brazil: Minas Gerais)
- Vanilla dungsii (Brazil)
- Vanilla edwallii (Brazil to Argentina)
- Vanilla fimbriata (Brazil, Guyana)
- Vanilla francoisii (NE Madagascar)
- Vanilla gardneri (Brazil)
- Vanilla giulianettii (New Guinea)
- Vanilla grandiflora (Venezuela, Trinidad & Tobago, Guyana, Peru, Brazil)
- Vanilla grandifolia (Príncipe to Zaire)
- Vanilla griffithii (W Malaysia)
- Vanilla guianensis (Guyana, Suriname, Brazil)
- Vanilla hallei (Gabon)
- Vanilla hamata (Peru)
- Vanilla hartii (Mexico to French Guiana & Brazil)
- Vanilla havilandii (Borneo)
- Vanilla helleri (Nicaragua, Costa Rica)
- Vanilla heterolopha (Gabon, Congo)
- Vanilla hostmannii (Colombia, Guyana, French Guiana, Suriname, Venezuela, Brazil)
- Vanilla humblotii (Comoros)
- Vanilla imperialis (W Tropical Africa to Tanzania and Angola)
- Vanilla inodora (Mexico and Central America)
- Vanilla insignis (Mexico and Central America)
- Vanilla kaniensis (New Guinea)
- Vanilla kempteriana (New Guinea)
- Vanilla kinabaluensis (Peninsular Malaysia to Borneo)
- Vanilla madagascariensis (N & NW Madagascar)
- Vanilla methonica (Colombia, Peru)
- Vanilla mexicana (S Florida, Mexico to Venezuela)
- Vanilla montana (Peninsular Malaysia)
- Vanilla moonii (Sri Lanka)
- Vanilla nigerica (S Nigeria to Cameroon)
- Vanilla ochyrae (Cameroon)
- Vanilla odorata (S Mexico to tropical South America)
- Vanilla organensis (Brazil: Rio de Janeiro)
- Vanilla oroana (Ecuador)
- Vanilla ovalis (Philippines)
- Vanilla ovata (Venezuela & Guyana)
- Vanilla palembanica (Sumatra)
- Vanilla palmarum (Amazon Basin)
- Vanilla parvifolia (S Brazil to Paraguay)
- Vanilla penicillata (Venezuela, Brazil)
- Vanilla perrieri (NW Madagascar)
- Vanilla phaeantha (S Florida, Caribbean, Mexico, Venezuela)
- Vanilla phalaenopsis (Seychelles)
- Vanilla planifolia (Mexico & Central America, widely cultivated)
- Vanilla platyphylla (Indonesia: Sulawesi)
- Vanilla poitaei (Caribbean)
- Vanilla polylepis (Kenya to S tropical Africa)
- Vanilla pompona (Mexico, Nicaragua, Costa Rica, W Colombia, Ecuador)
- Vanilla ramificans (New Guinea)
- Vanilla ramosa (Ghana to Tanzania)
- Vanilla ribeiroi (Brazil, Guyana, Colombia)
- Vanilla roscheri (Ethiopia to NE KwaZulu-Natal)
- Vanilla ruiziana (Peru, Bolivia)
- Vanilla rupicola (Brazil: Minas Gerais)
- Vanilla savannarum (Cuba)
- Vanilla schwackeana (Brazil: Minas Gerais)
- Vanilla seranica (Indonesia: Seram)
- Vanilla seretii (WC tropical Africa)
- Vanilla siamensis (S Yunnan to Thailand)
- Vanilla somae (China to Taiwan)
- Vanilla sprucei (Colombia)
- Vanilla sumatrana (Sumatra)
- Vanilla trigonocarpa (Costa Rica to N Brazil)
- Vanilla utteridgei (S New Guinea)
- Vanilla vellozii (Brazil, Paraguay, Argentina)
- Vanilla verrucosa (Argentina)
- Vanilla walkeriae (S India, Sri Lanka)
- Vanilla wariensis (New Guinea)
- Vanilla wightii (S India, Sri Lanka)
- Vanilla yersiniana (Thailand, Vietnam)
- Vanilla zanzibarica (E Africa)
- Vanilla × tahitensis (South Pacific)
