= Vanilla shenzhenica =

Scientific classification
- Kingdom: Plantae
- Clade: Tracheophytes
- Clade: Angiosperms
- Clade: Monocots
- Order: Asparagales
- Family: Orchidaceae
- Subfamily: Vanilloideae
- Genus: Vanilla
- Species: V. shenzhenica

Binomial name
- Vanilla shenzhenica Z.J.Liu & S.C.Chen

Species of flowering plant

Vanilla shenzhenica is a species of Vanilla native to Guangdong (Shenzhen and Huizhou) and Hong Kong in China.

It used to be treated as a synonym of Vanilla somae, but it differs from the latter by having the flower not fully opening, with sepals/petals wider than 1.6 cm (up to 1 cm in V. somae) and a distinctly undulate purple-red lip (more or less flat-margined and pinkish yellow-green in V. somae) whose apical appendages are conical (clavate in V. somae).
