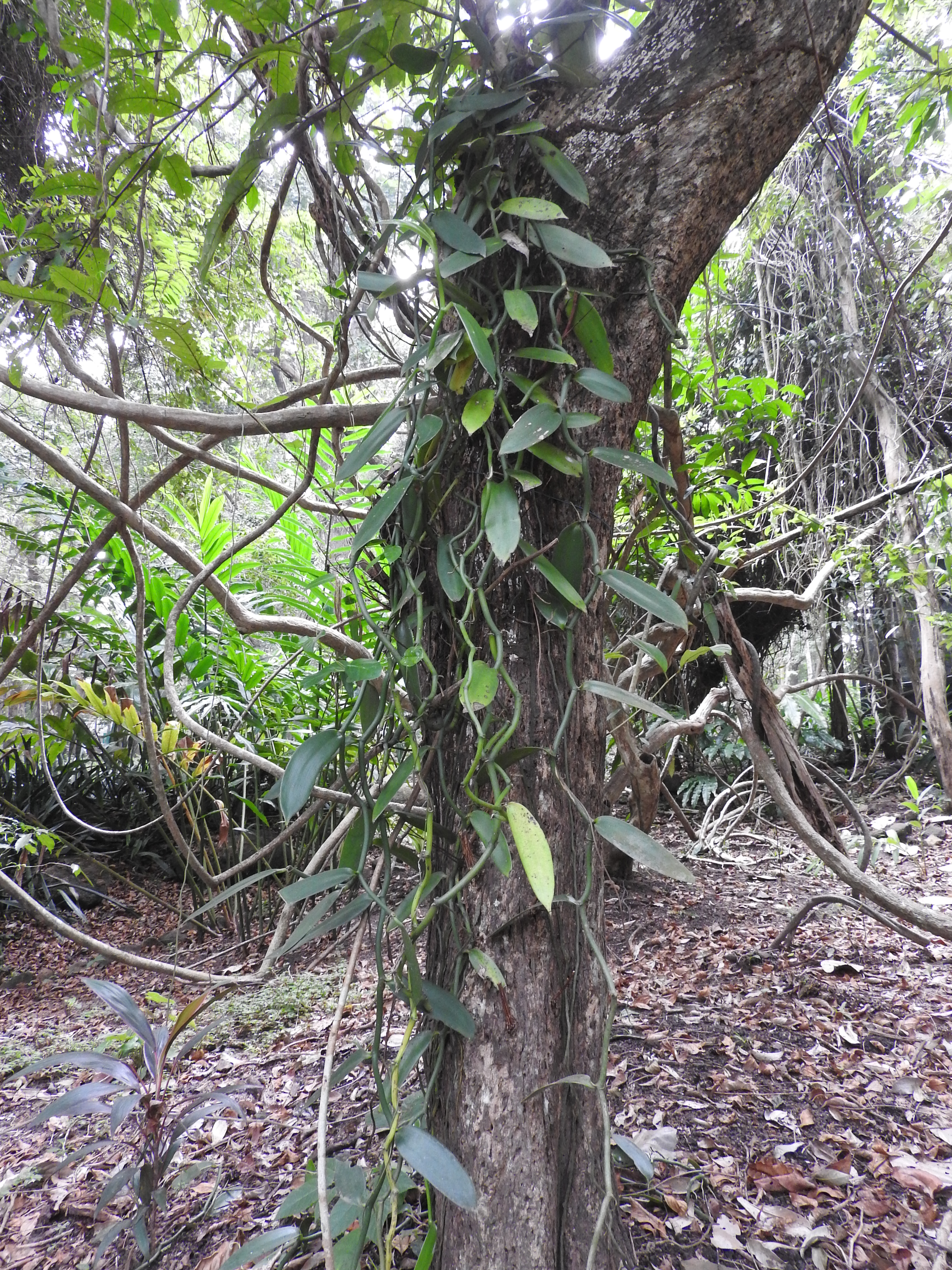

Scientific classification
- Kingdom: Plantae
- Clade: Tracheophytes
- Clade: Angiosperms
- Clade: Monocots
- Order: Asparagales
- Family: Orchidaceae
- Subfamily: Vanilloideae
- Genus: Vanilla
- Species: V. andamanica

Binomial name
- Vanilla andamanica Rolfe

= Vanilla andamanica =

Species of orchid

Vanilla andamanica is an endangered wild relative of commercial vanilla, Vanilla planifolia, the source of vanilla essence. It grows in the Andaman and Nicobar Islands, India in the Bay of Bengal., and classified as a Vulnerable species (VU) by the IUCN Red List.

It has creamy white fragrant flowers, and was first identified by botanist, Robert Allen Rolfe in 1918. Today, it is part of Floriculture emphasis in the island state., also conserved in the 'Dhanikhari Experimental Botanic Garden', Port Blair, by the Botanical Survey of India.

Living collections of this taxon is also under ex situ conservation outside the islands at the Field Gene Bank of Jawaharlal Nehru Tropical Botanic Garden and Research Institute, Trivandrum, India. This is a 'narrow endemic' rarely found in the interior evergreen forests of this archipelago. The flowers are typical creamy yellowish with purple coloured interior. There are differences in opinion among taxonomists about the specific status of the Andaman taxon. According to late Seidenfaden Vanilla andamanica Rolfe is very similar to the Thailand species Vanilla albida Blume.
