= Vanilla andina =

Scientific classification
- Kingdom: Plantae
- Clade: Tracheophytes
- Clade: Angiosperms
- Clade: Monocots
- Order: Asparagales
- Family: Orchidaceae
- Subfamily: Vanilloideae
- Genus: Vanilla
- Species: V. andina

Binomial name
- Vanilla andina Damian & H.Garzón

Species of orchid

Vanilla andina is a species of vanilla orchid. It was first described in 2022 from specimens collected in Peru and Ecuador. It is similar to Vanilla armoriquensis but differs in its “prominent parallel callus, longitudinal narrow keels that extend above the middle of the lip and broadly obtuse to emarginate midlobe with crispate margins.”
