= Vanilla rupicola =

Scientific classification
- Kingdom: Plantae
- Clade: Tracheophytes
- Clade: Angiosperms
- Clade: Monocots
- Order: Asparagales
- Family: Orchidaceae
- Subfamily: Vanilloideae
- Genus: Vanilla
- Species: V. rupicola

Binomial name
- Vanilla rupicola Pansarin & E.L.F.Menezes

Species of orchid

Vanilla rupicola is a species of orchid in the genus Vanilla, found in the Espinhaço Range in Minas Gerais, Brazil. It was described by Emerson Ricardo Pansarin and Euler da Luz Fernandes Menezes in 2023.

== Etymology ==
The species name rupicola refers to the species' habit of growing on rocks (that is, the species is rupicolous), which is uncommon among members of the genus Vanilla found in the Neotropical realm.

== Description ==
The plant can be up to 12 meters in length. The leaves are rounded and sessile, measuring from 3.2 by 2.8 cm to 9 by 5.2 cm in size. The shape of the leaf helps distinguish it from other Neotropical members of its genus. The flowers last for 12 hours, and produce a sweet fragrance in the heat. Flowers have been found between late September and early November, and the fruits of the plant ripen between May and June.

== Distribution ==
The species is found among the campos rupestres of the Espinhaço Range in the municipality of Diamantina, Minas Gerais, where it can be found growing on rock outcroppings. It is found between 800 and 1300 meters from sea level.
