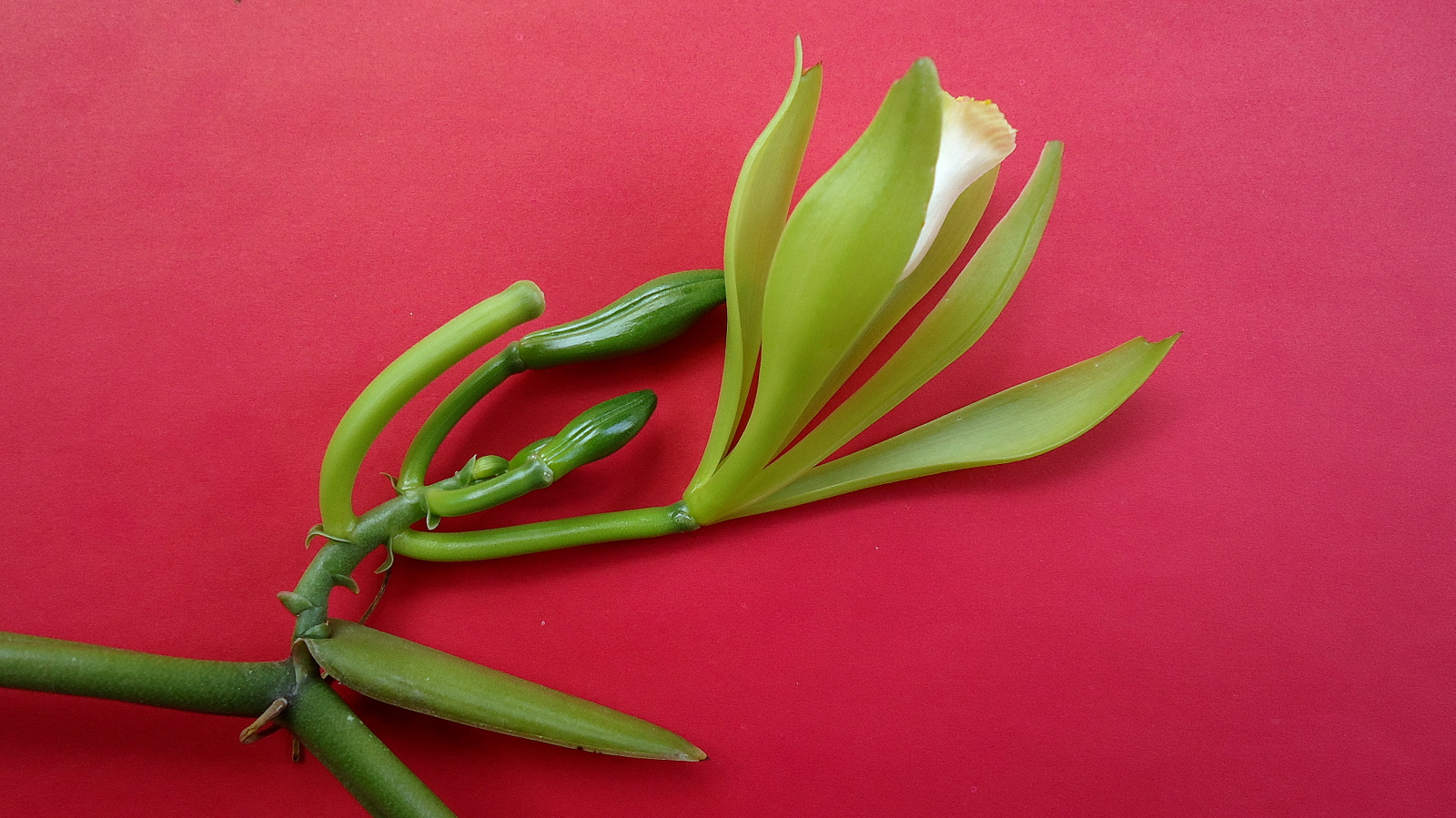

Scientific classification
- Kingdom: Plantae
- Clade: Tracheophytes
- Clade: Angiosperms
- Clade: Monocots
- Order: Asparagales
- Family: Orchidaceae
- Subfamily: Vanilloideae
- Genus: Vanilla
- Species: V. bahiana

Binomial name
- Vanilla bahiana Hoehne

= Vanilla bahiana =

Species of orchid

Vanilla bahiana is an endangered species of vanilla orchid that is restricted to Brazil. It is a natural source of vanillin and is closely related to Vanilla planifolia, a main producer of vanilla.
