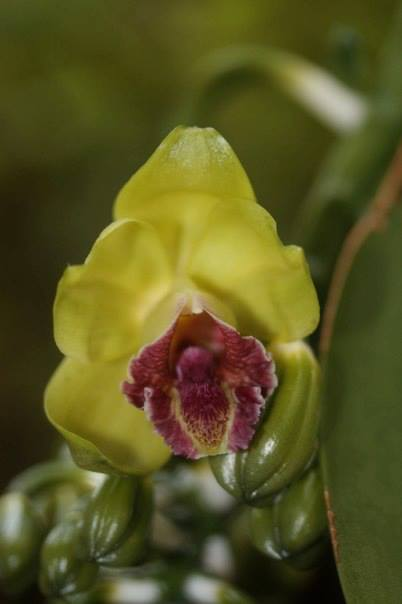

Scientific classification
- Kingdom: Plantae
- Clade: Tracheophytes
- Clade: Angiosperms
- Clade: Monocots
- Order: Asparagales
- Family: Orchidaceae
- Subfamily: Vanilloideae
- Genus: Vanilla
- Species: V. raabii

Binomial name
- Vanilla raabii Ormerod & Cootes

= Vanilla raabii =

Species of orchid

Vanilla raabii is a species of orchid in the genus Vanilla. It is endemic to the Philippines and can be found on Luzon, the Panay Peninsula, and Samar.

It is a climbing epiphytic orchid with terete roots and stems with oval to lanceolate leaves that are fleshy and thick.

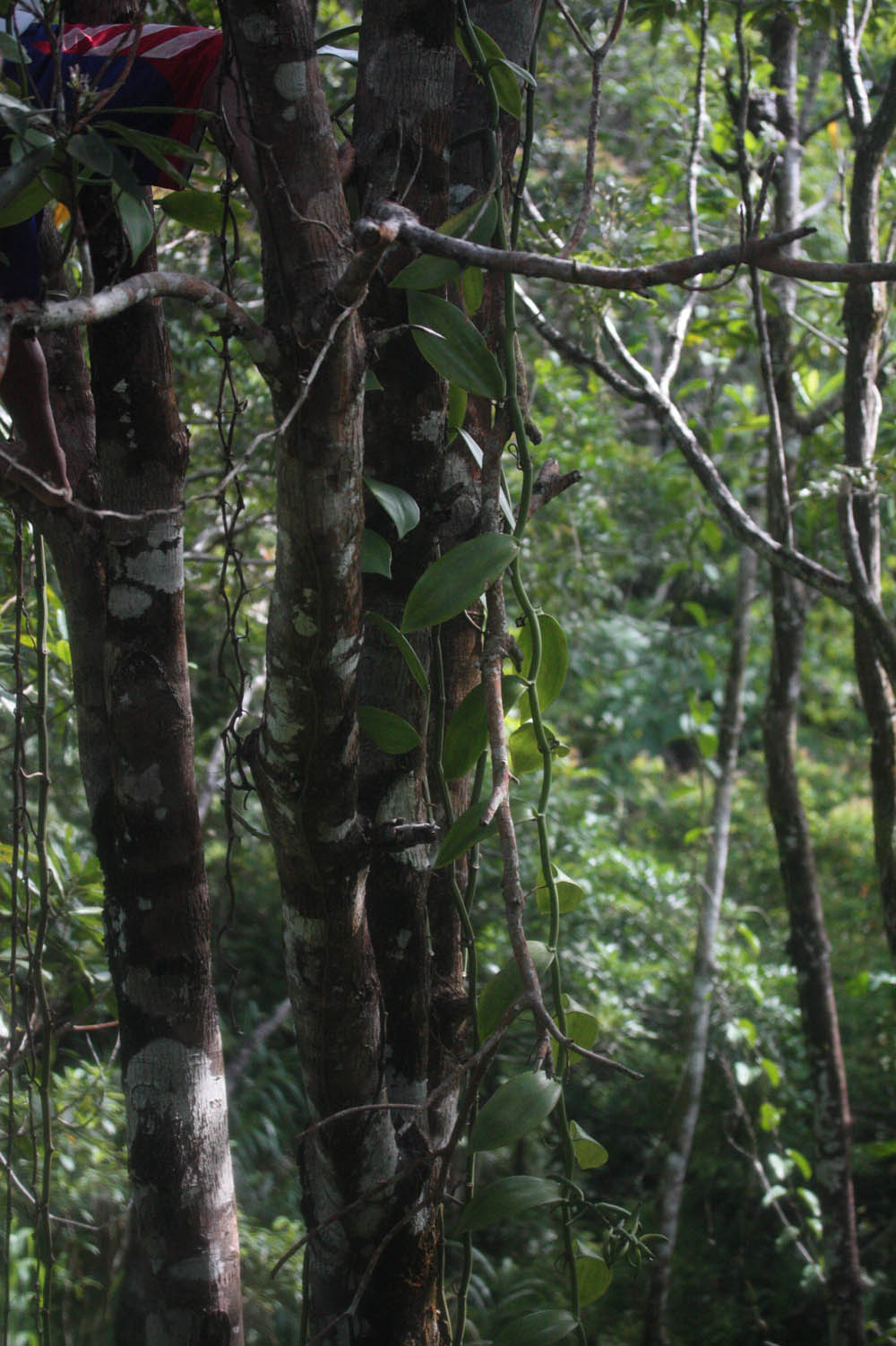
Vanilla raabii, plant
