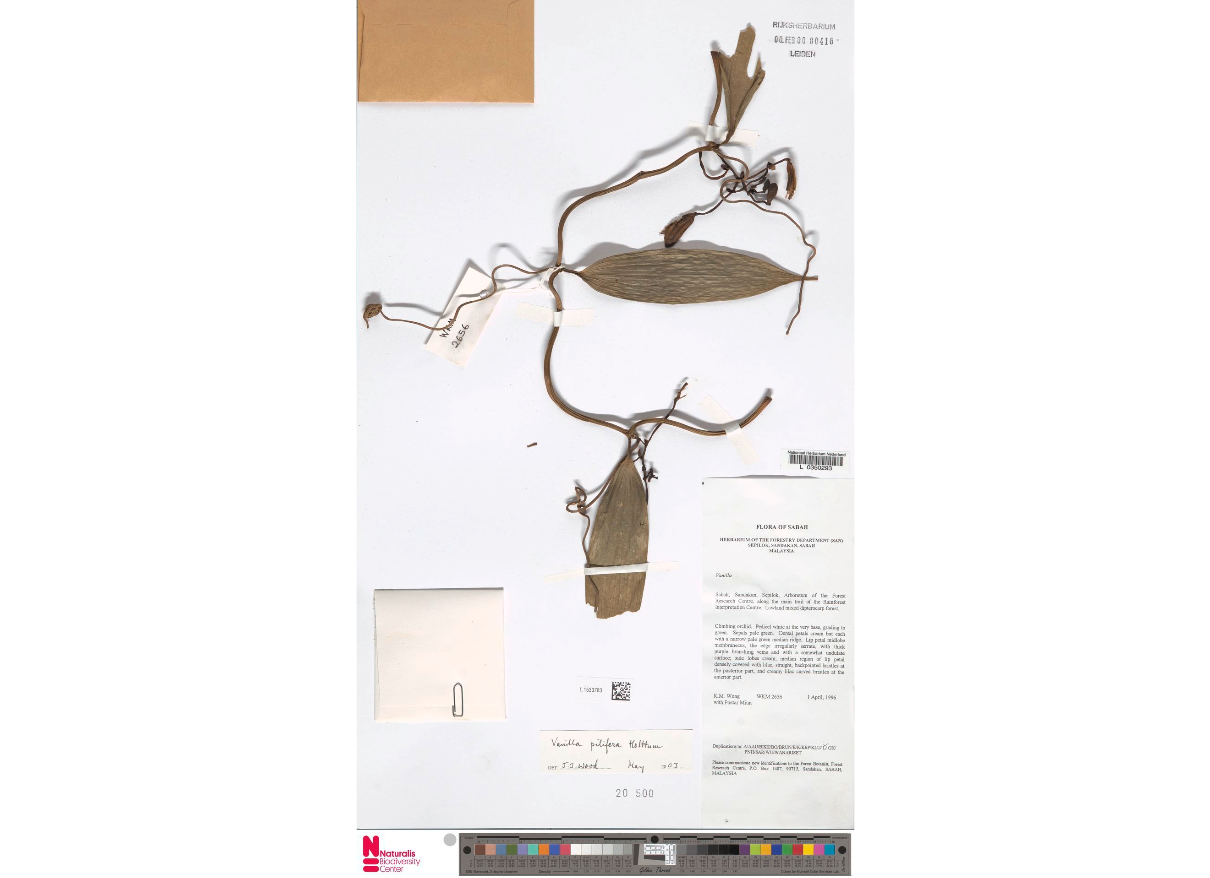
- Herbarium specimen of Vanilla pilifera

Scientific classification
- Kingdom: Plantae
- Clade: Tracheophytes
- Clade: Angiosperms
- Clade: Monocots
- Order: Asparagales
- Family: Orchidaceae
- Subfamily: Vanilloideae
- Genus: Vanilla
- Species: V. pilifera

Binomial name
- Vanilla pilifera Holttum

= Vanilla pilifera =

Species of orchid

Vanilla pilifera is a species of vanilla orchid. It is native to Southeast Asia.

== Distribution ==
Vanilla pilifera is found only in Malay Peninsula and peninsular Thailand. Vanilla pilifera is cultivated at the Hortus Botanicus in Leiden. Scattered in dry evergreen forest.

== Description ==
Monopodial terrestrial climbing orchid, stem and leaves succulent, rooting from node, internode 7–10 cm. Leaves thick, oblong, 10–14 cm; apex acute; base obtuse; petioles 1–1.5 cm. Inflorescences arise from node, ca 5 cm. long, with 6–12 flowers; bracts 0.5–1 cm. long; pedicels 5–6 cm long. Sepal 3, free, oblong-lanceolate, greenish, shiny, 3–3.4 cm long. Lateral petals similar to sepals; labellum whitish pink with dark purple veins inside, ca 3 cm long with appendage hairs at apex down to the mouth close to 8–10 scales of brush, hairs ca 0.5 cm long; lower inside in front column dark red; column 1–1.8 cm long, most part connate to labellum; operculum green.
