= Vanilla coursii =

Scientific classification
- Kingdom: Plantae
- Clade: Tracheophytes
- Clade: Angiosperms
- Clade: Monocots
- Order: Asparagales
- Family: Orchidaceae
- Subfamily: Vanilloideae
- Genus: Vanilla
- Species: V. coursii

Binomial name
- Vanilla coursii H.Perrier

Species of plant

Vanilla coursii is a rare orchid species in the genus Vanilla, located in Madagascar.
