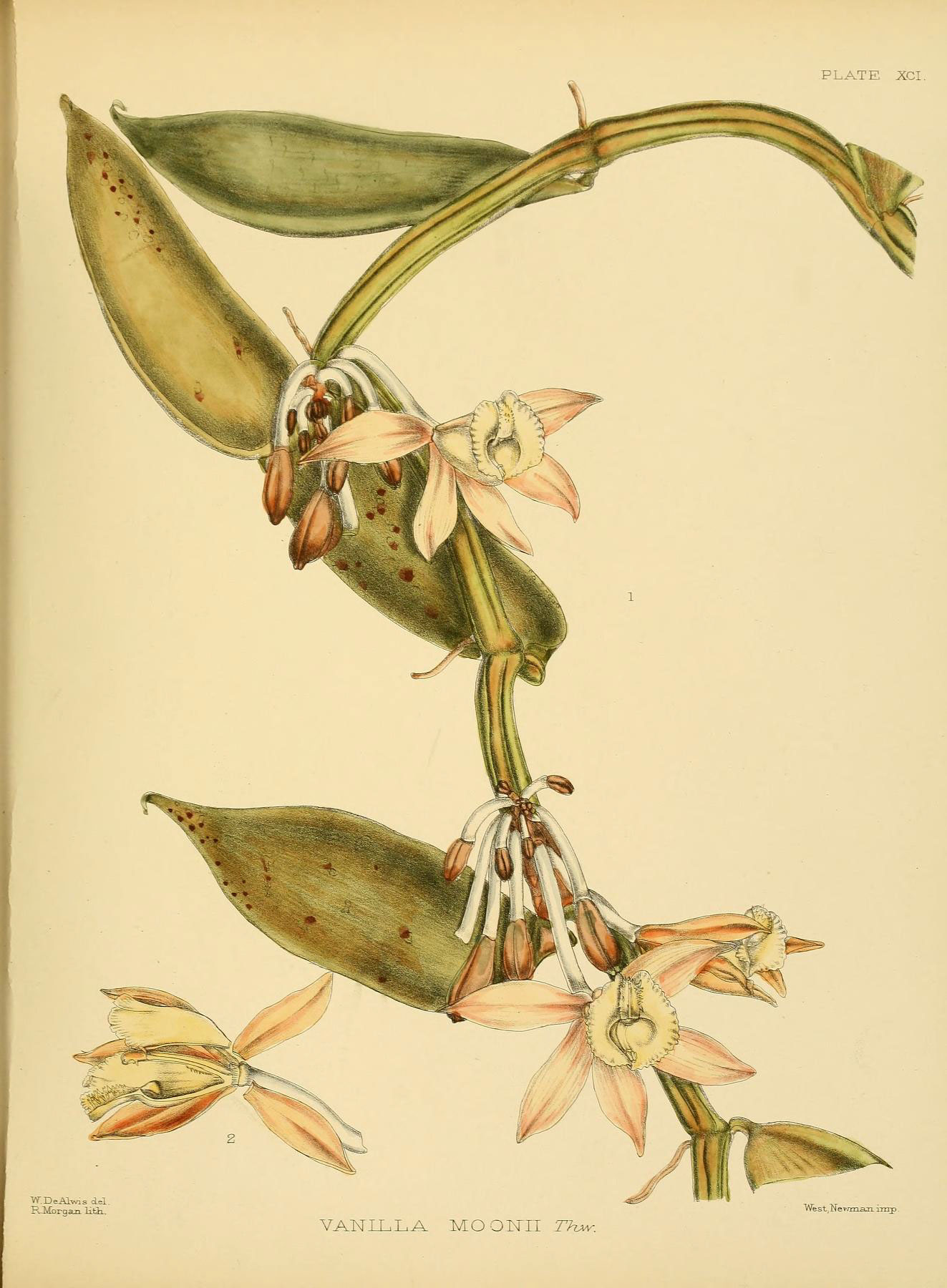

Scientific classification
- Kingdom: Plantae
- Clade: Tracheophytes
- Clade: Angiosperms
- Clade: Monocots
- Order: Asparagales
- Family: Orchidaceae
- Subfamily: Vanilloideae
- Genus: Vanilla
- Species: V. moonii

Binomial name
- Vanilla moonii Thwaites

= Vanilla moonii =

Species of orchid

Vanilla moonii is a species of vanilla orchid that is endemic to Sri Lanka.
