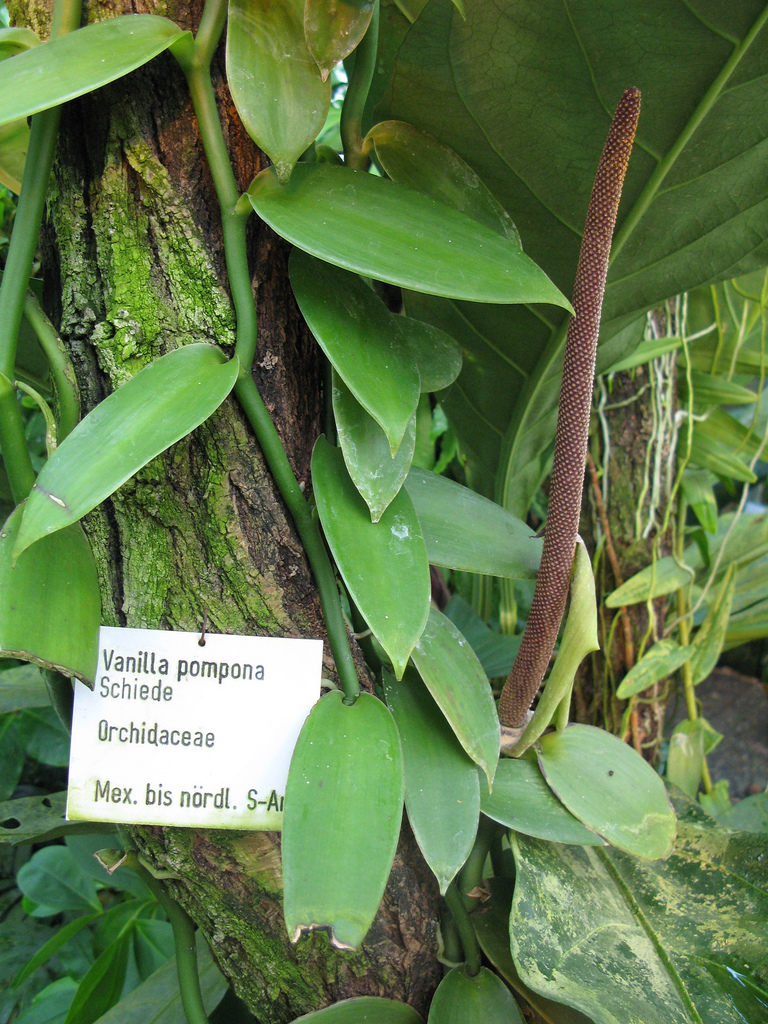

Conservation status
- Endangered (IUCN 3.1)

Scientific classification
- Kingdom: Plantae
- Clade: Tracheophytes
- Clade: Angiosperms
- Clade: Monocots
- Order: Asparagales
- Family: Orchidaceae
- Subfamily: Vanilloideae
- Genus: Vanilla
- Species: V. pompona

Binomial name
- Vanilla pompona Schiede

Synonyms
- Notylia pompona (Schiede) Conz.

= Vanilla pompona =

Species of orchid

Vanilla pompona is a species of vanilla orchid. It is native to Mexico and northern South America, and is one of the sources for vanilla flavouring, due to its high vanillin content. According to research by British and Swedish scientists, the smell of vanilla is a favorite among most people in the world.

Vanilla pompona found in the Peruvian Amazon has been tested using HPLC analysis showing a concentration of vanillin content up to 9.88g/100g making it suitable for the food or cosmetic industry.

== Description ==
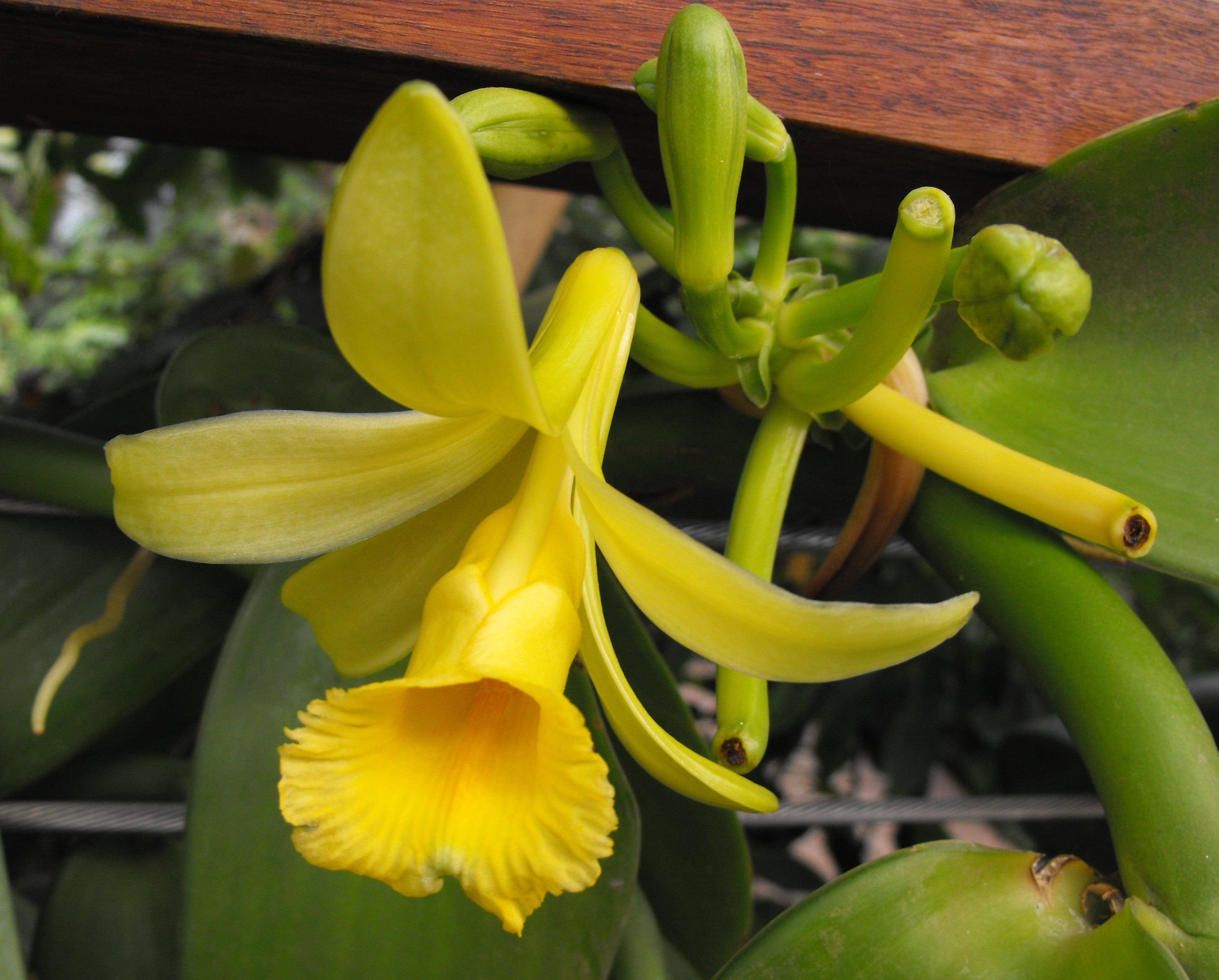
Vanilla pompona flower

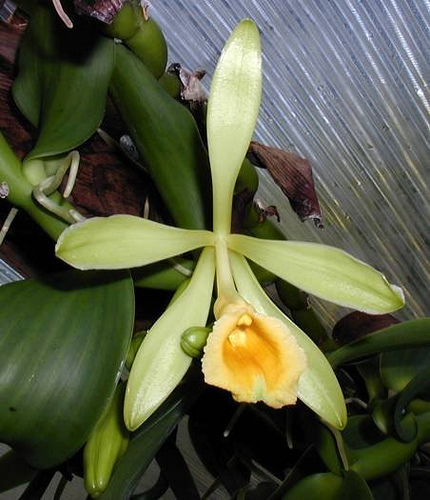
Vanilla pompona flower

Like all members of the genus Vanilla, V. pompona is a vine. It uses its fleshy roots to support itself as it grows. Its leaves and stems are generally thicker than in V. planifolia and V. phaeantha.

== Pollination ==
V. pompona is one of the few Vanilla species for which there is definitive identification of the agents responsible for pollination; a study found that males of a medium-sized orchid bee, Eulaema cingulata, remove and transfer pollen of V. pompona in Peru, apparently while they are searching for nectar that the flowers do not possess. Other bee species visit the flowers, but larger species cannot fit inside to reach the floral reproductive organs, and smaller species do not make physical contact with the stigma; of several observed floral visitors, only E. cingulata was within the necessary size range to accomplish pollen transfer.
