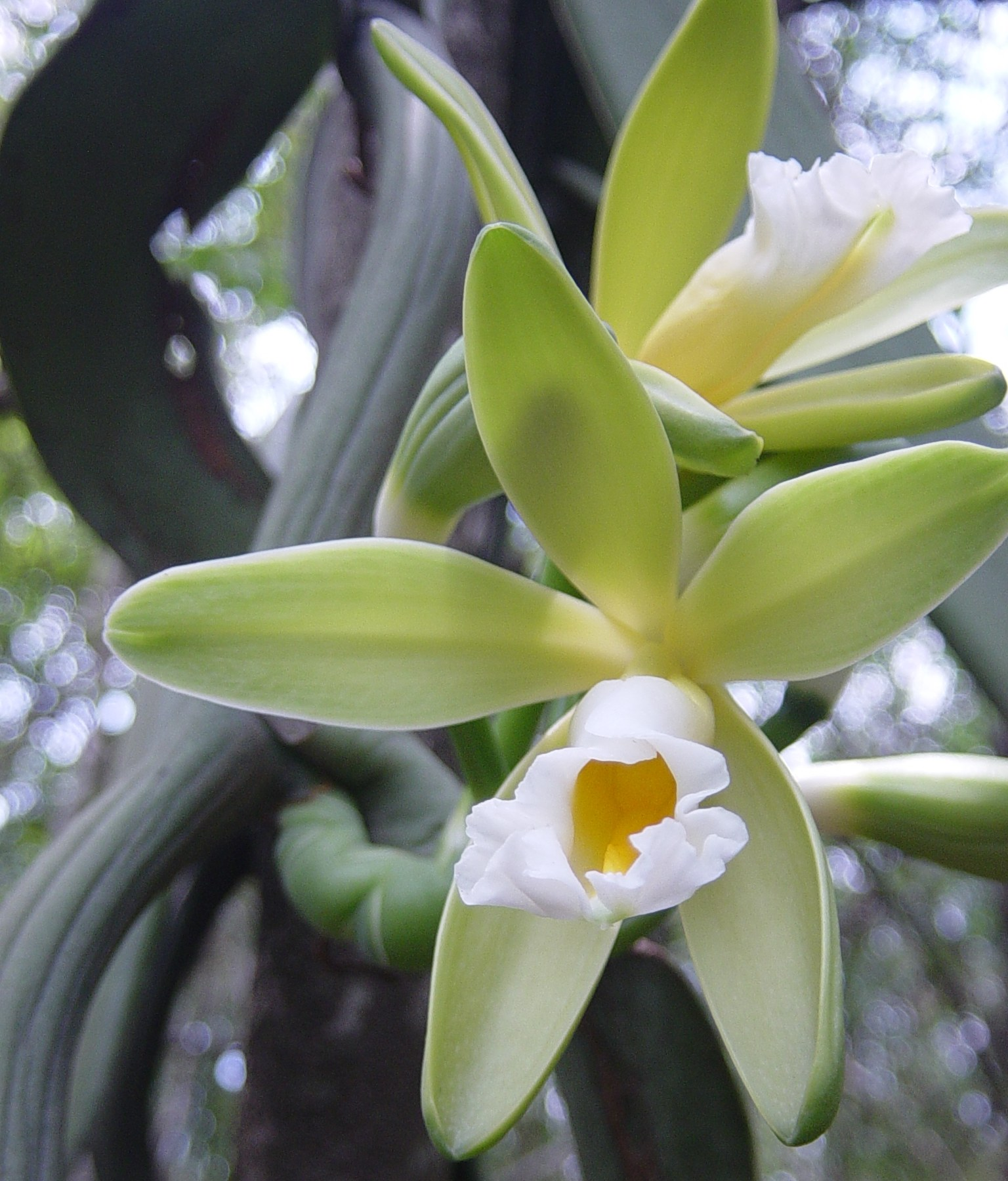
- Vanilla chamissonis flowers

Scientific classification
- Kingdom: Plantae
- Clade: Tracheophytes
- Clade: Angiosperms
- Clade: Monocots
- Order: Asparagales
- Family: Orchidaceae
- Subfamily: Vanilloideae
- Genus: Vanilla
- Species: V. chamissonis

Binomial name
- Vanilla chamissonis Klotzsch

Synonyms
- Vanilla chamissonis var. brevifolia Cogn.; Vanilla vellozii Rolfe; Vanilla argentina Hicken

= Vanilla chamissonis =

Chamisso's vanilla

Species of orchid

Vanilla chamissonis, commonly known as the Chamisso's vanilla, is a species of orchid.

The orchid is native to South America, from French Guiana through Brazil to northeastern Argentina.

The species name honors Adelbert von Chamisso.
