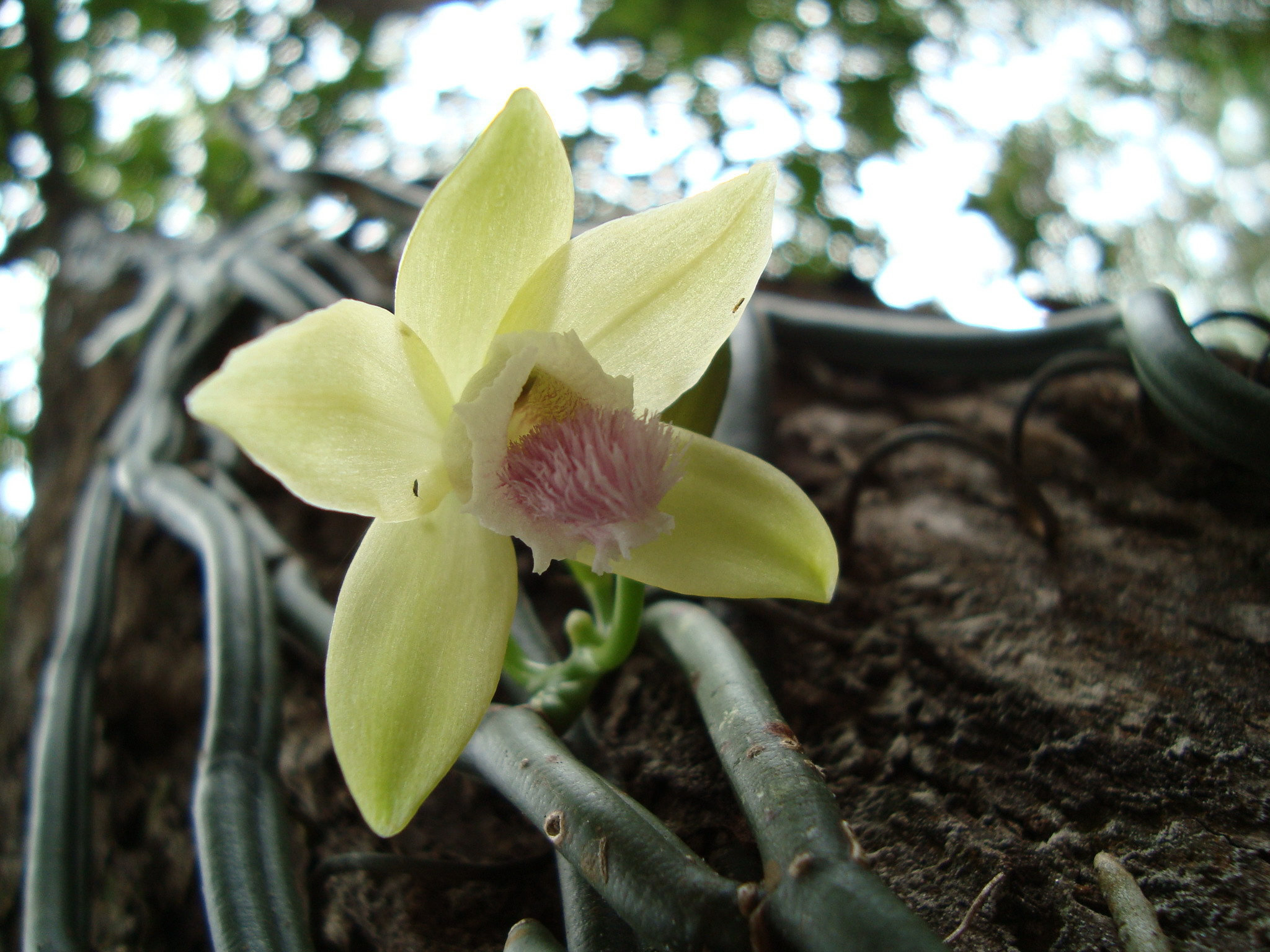

Scientific classification
- Kingdom: Plantae
- Clade: Tracheophytes
- Clade: Angiosperms
- Clade: Monocots
- Order: Asparagales
- Family: Orchidaceae
- Subfamily: Vanilloideae
- Genus: Vanilla
- Species: V. aphylla

Binomial name
- Vanilla aphylla Blume

= Vanilla aphylla =

Species of orchid

Vanilla aphylla is a species of vanilla orchid. It is native to Southeast Asia. It is found throughout Southeast Asia including; Laos, Thailand, Malaysia and Singapore. Like all members of the genus Vanilla, V. aphylla is a vine. It uses its fleshy roots to support itself as it grows.
