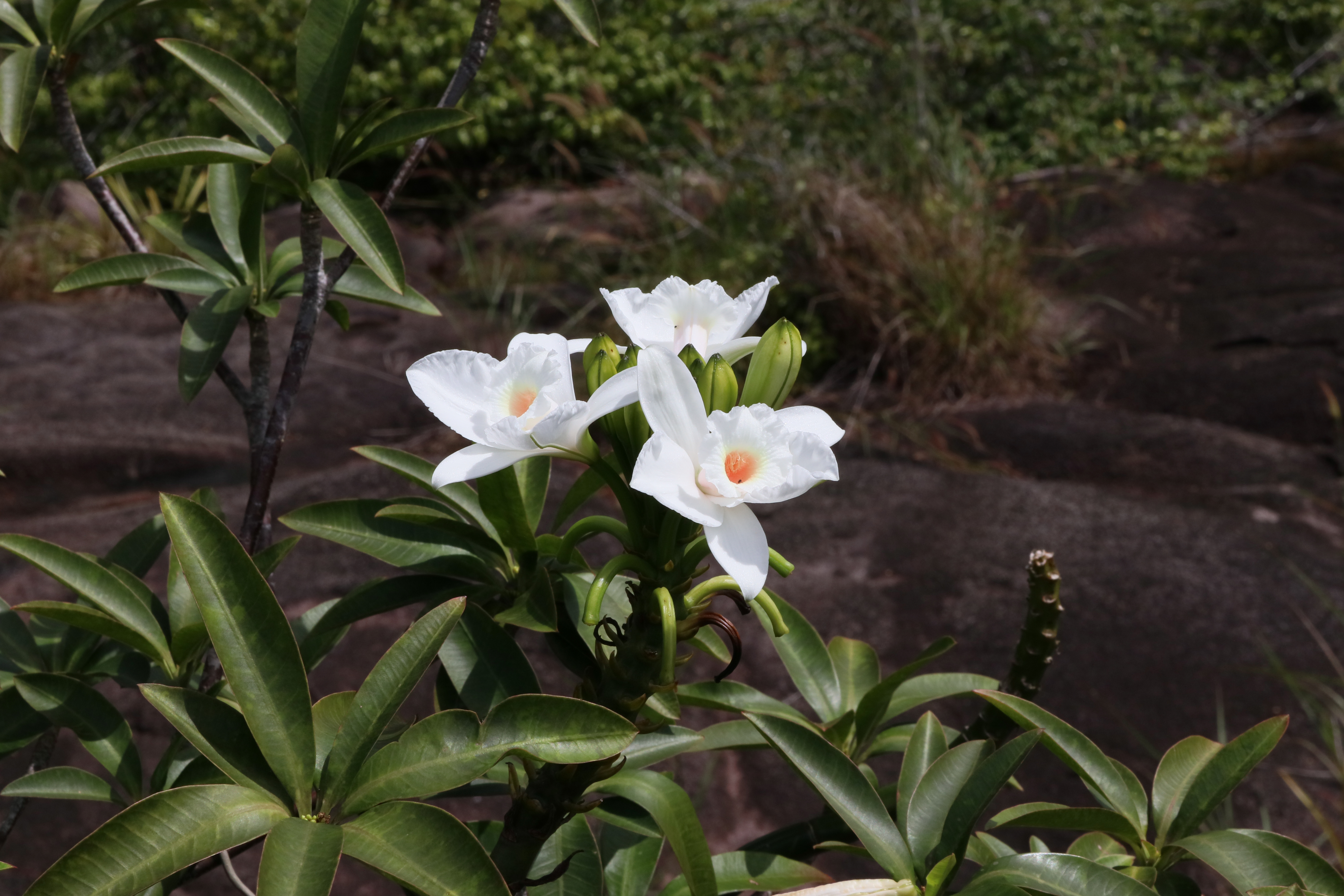

Scientific classification
- Kingdom: Plantae
- Clade: Tracheophytes
- Clade: Angiosperms
- Clade: Monocots
- Order: Asparagales
- Family: Orchidaceae
- Subfamily: Vanilloideae
- Genus: Vanilla
- Species: V. phalaenopsis

Binomial name
- Vanilla phalaenopsis Rchb.f. ex Van Houtte

= Vanilla phalaenopsis =

Species of leafless scrambling succulent plant

Vanilla phalaenopsis, vanille sauvage, is a leafless scrambling succulent plant belonging to the orchid family (Orchidaceae), and endemic to the Seychelles Islands. The flower is about three inches (eight centimeters) wide. The five flat tepals are white, while the labellum has an apricot-colored throat. The vanilla bean is up to 6.5 inches (16 cm) in length. All the flowers on one stem bloom simultaneously.
