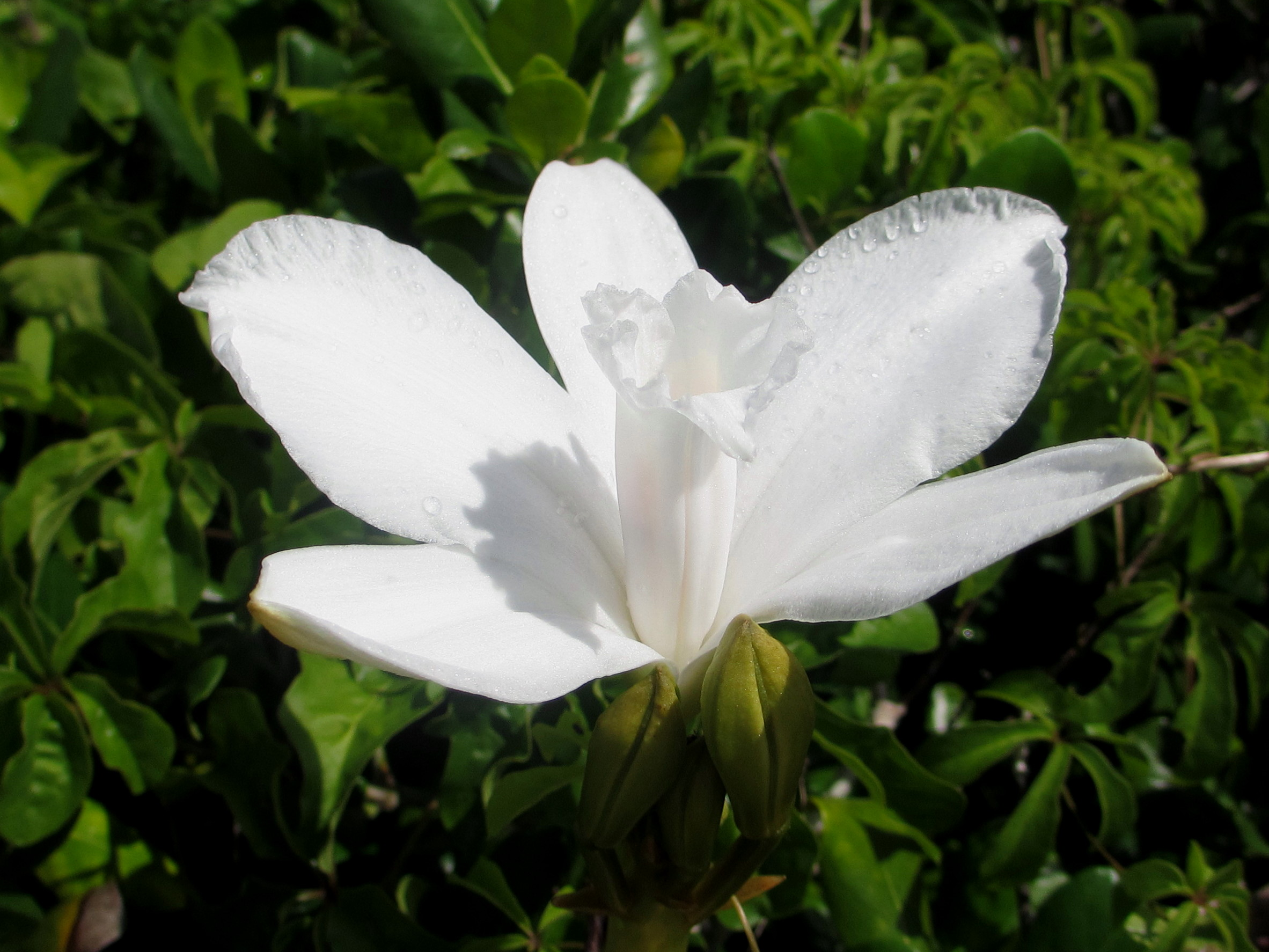
- Vanilla roscheri in the wild on the North Mozambique coast (Mecufi District).

Scientific classification
- Kingdom: Plantae
- Clade: Tracheophytes
- Clade: Angiosperms
- Clade: Monocots
- Order: Asparagales
- Family: Orchidaceae
- Subfamily: Vanilloideae
- Genus: Vanilla
- Species: V. roscheri

Binomial name
- Vanilla roscheri Rchb. f.

= Vanilla roscheri =

Species of orchid

Vanilla roscheri is a species of flowering plant in the family Orchidaceae found in Kenya, Somalia, Mozambique, Tanzania, Ethiopia, and South Africa.
