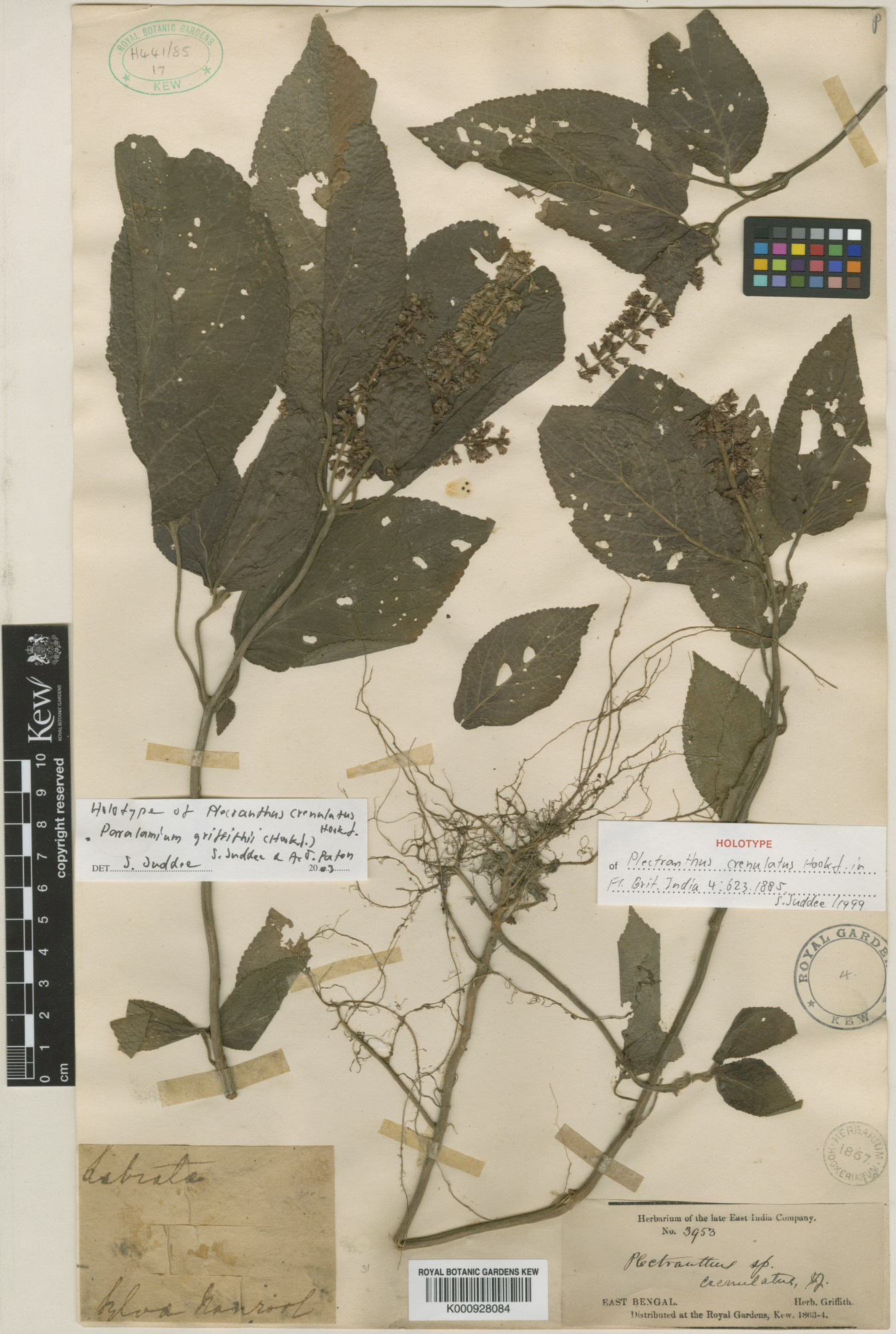

Scientific classification
- Kingdom: Plantae
- Clade: Tracheophytes
- Clade: Angiosperms
- Clade: Monocots
- Order: Asparagales
- Family: Orchidaceae
- Subfamily: Vanilloideae
- Genus: Vanilla
- Species: V. siamensis

Binomial name
- Vanilla siamensis Rolfe ex Downie

Synonyms
- Vanilla pierrei Gagnep. 1931

= Vanilla siamensis =

Species of orchid

Vanilla siamensis (common name: Thai vanilla) is a plant species of southern China, Thailand, Cambodia, and Vietnam. It is an epiphyte that occurs in montane evergreen forests.

== Description ==
Vanilla siamensis is an evergreen climber that forms dark green shoots several meters long and 0.4–2 centimeters in diameter. The leaves are oval, wedge-shaped at the base with a broad petiole 1.5–2.5 centimeters long. The leaf becomes elongated away from the base. The leaves grow to be 9–23 centimeters long and 4.5–10 centimeters wide.

== Chromosomes ==
The chromosome number is 2n=32.

== Distribution ==
Vanilla siamensis is found in Yunnan province of southern China, Thailand, Cambodia, and Vietnam. It grows in evergreen forests at altitudes ranging from 700 to 1300 meters.

== Systematics ==
Vanilla siamensis was first described in 1925 by Dorothy G. Downie.

Within the genus Vanilla, Vanilla siamensis is placed in the subgenus Xanata in the section Tethya, which contains Old World species. Vanilla pierrei, described by François Gagnepain on the basis of only one bud, is considered a synonym by Soto Arenas and Cribb. They list Vanilla abundiflora and Vanilla kinabaluensis as related species.
