= Vanilla walkeriae =

- In Tamil Nadu, India

Scientific classification
- Kingdom: Plantae
- Clade: Tracheophytes
- Clade: Angiosperms
- Clade: Monocots
- Order: Asparagales
- Family: Orchidaceae
- Subfamily: Vanilloideae
- Genus: Vanilla
- Species: V. walkeriae

Binomial name
- Vanilla walkeriae Wight

Species of orchid

Vanilla walkeriae is a species of vanilla orchid native to India and Sri Lanka. It grows in forest and jungle habitat. It is considered to be a rare species.

== Description ==
This species is an epiphyte with thick, succulent, rooting stems up to 15 m (49 ft) long that climbs on trees and shrubs. The lance-shaped leaves are up to 3.7 cm (1.5 in) long. The inflorescence is a large raceme of many flowers. The flowers can be up to 6.8 cm (2.7 in) wide and have wavy-edged white petals. The fruit is a thin capsule up to 15 cm (5.9 in) long.

The scientific name commemorates Anna Maria Walker of Sri Lanka with whom Robert Wight collaborated.

== Uses ==
The plant is used in the traditional veterinary medicine practices of the Irulas in India. Stem paste is fed to cattle to treat fever and as a nutritional supplement.

== Conservation ==
The species is threatened by habitat destruction.
