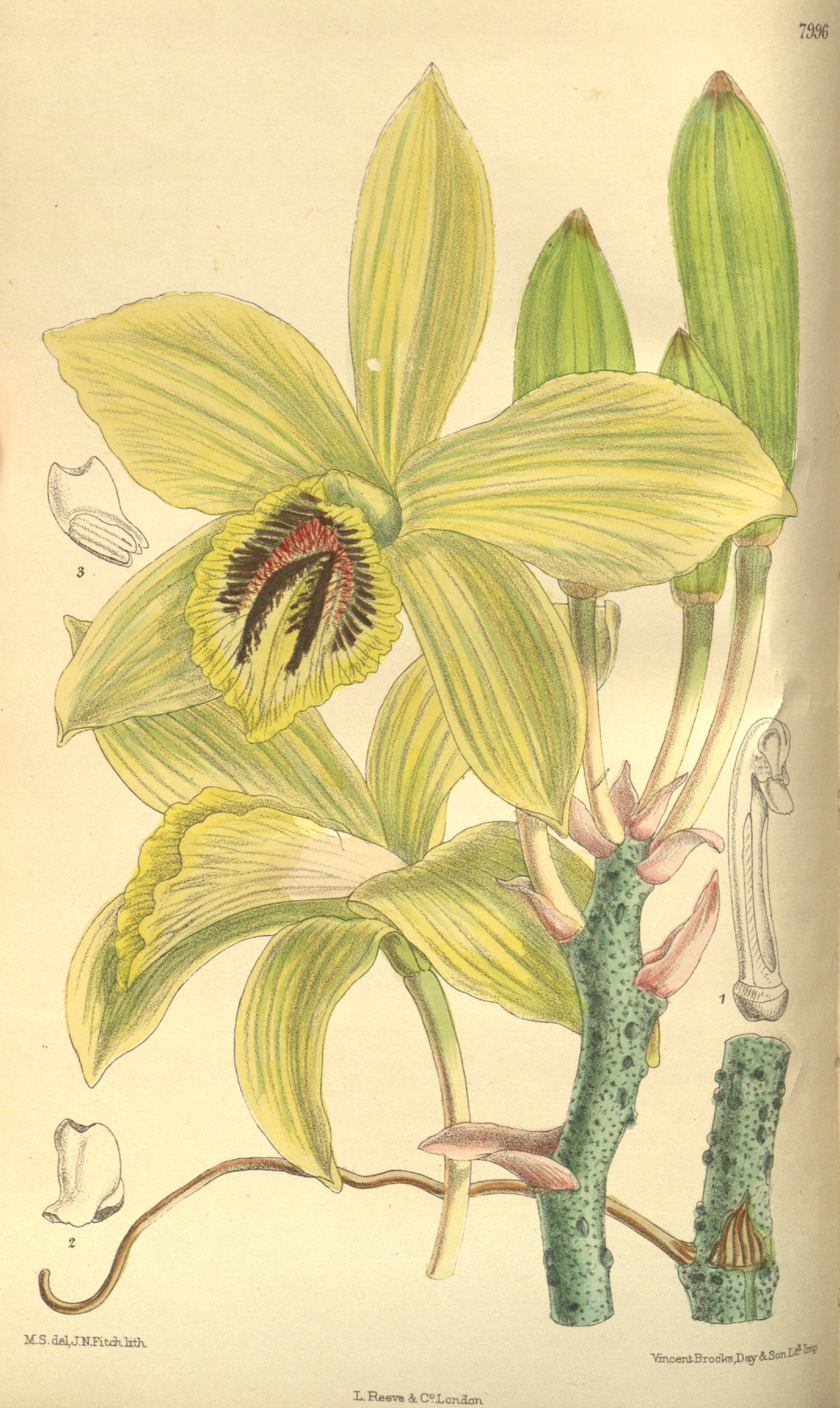
- Vanilla humblotii illustration

Scientific classification
- Kingdom: Plantae
- Clade: Tracheophytes
- Clade: Angiosperms
- Clade: Monocots
- Order: Asparagales
- Family: Orchidaceae
- Subfamily: Vanilloideae
- Genus: Vanilla
- Species: V. humblotii

Binomial name
- Vanilla humblotii Rchb.f.

= Vanilla humblotii =

Species of orchid

Vanilla humblotii is a species of orchid endemic to Madagascar and the island of Grande Comore in the Comoros Islands. Both are off Africa in the Indian Ocean. They are an endangered species, with a low population caused by anthropogenic activity. They live on dry, rocky mountains and in mesophilous forests. Vanilla humblotii have no leaves and are characterized by canary yellow flowers with a red velvet lip. They are known to have applications in medicine due to its antimicrobial properties, so it is important to protect them for future use.
