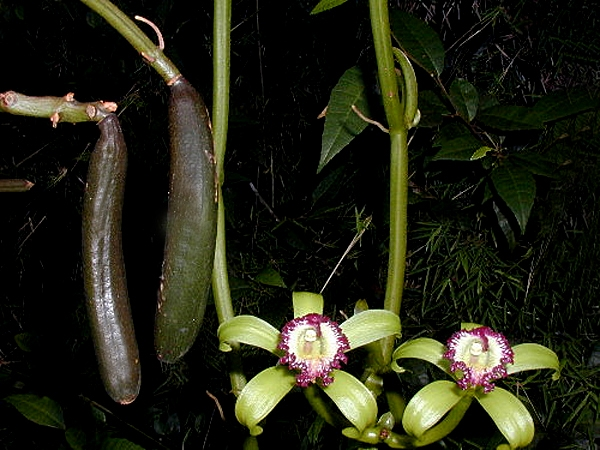

Scientific classification
- Kingdom: Plantae
- Clade: Tracheophytes
- Clade: Angiosperms
- Clade: Monocots
- Order: Asparagales
- Family: Orchidaceae
- Subfamily: Vanilloideae
- Genus: Vanilla
- Species: V. poitaei

Binomial name
- Vanilla poitaei Rchb.f.

= Vanilla poitaei =

Species of vanilla

Vanilla poitaei is species in the orchid family found in the Caribbean.

== Range ==
The native range of this species includes the Bahamas, Cuba, Dominican Republic and Puerto Rico.

== Taxonomy ==
Vanilla poitaei was first scientifically described in 1876 by Heinrich Gustav Reichenbach, based on material collected by Pierre Antoine Poiteau in Santo Domingo.
