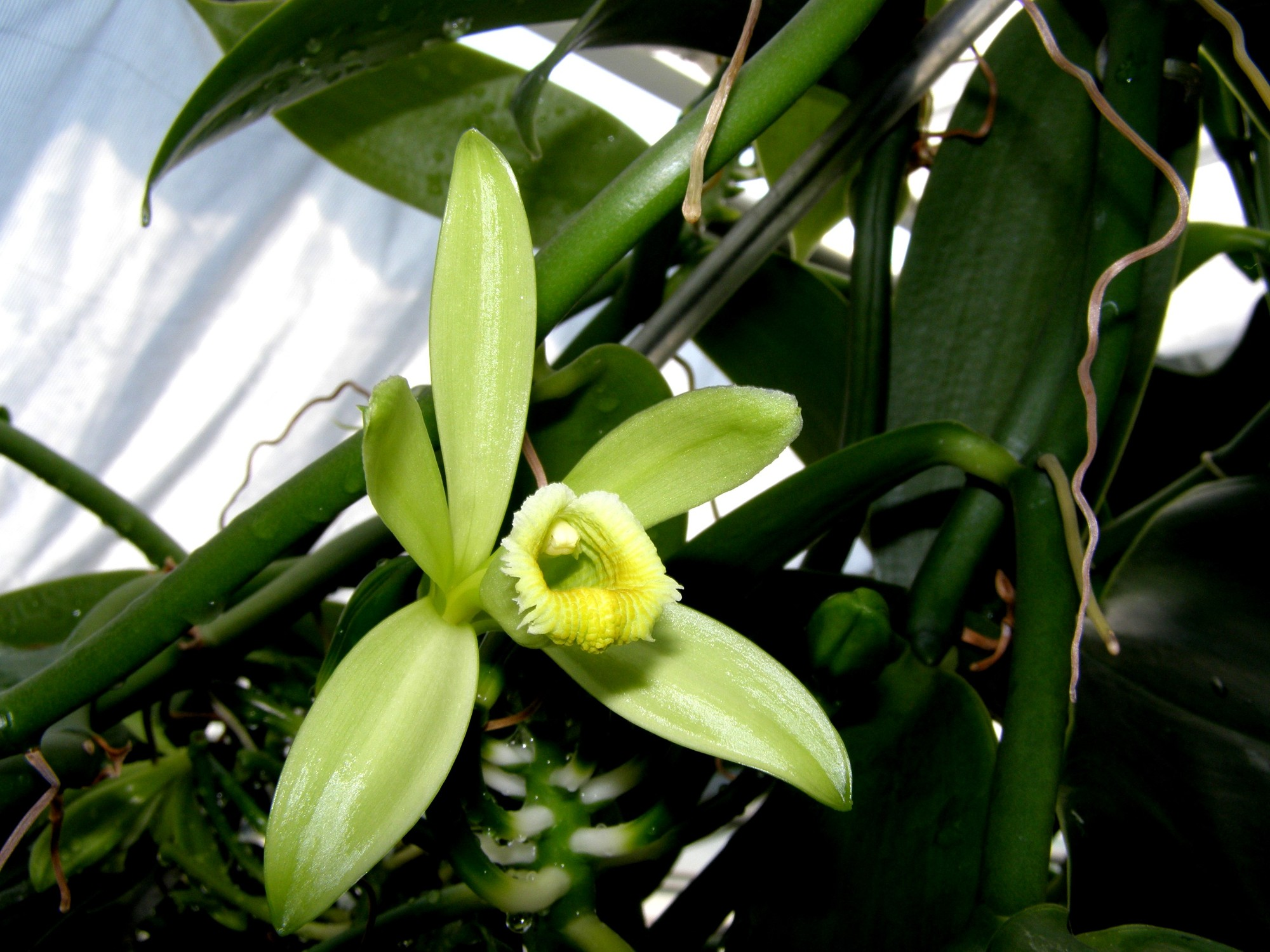
- Flat-leaved vanilla (Vanilla planifolia)

Scientific classification
- Kingdom: Plantae
- Clade: Tracheophytes
- Clade: Angiosperms
- Clade: Monocots
- Order: Asparagales
- Family: Orchidaceae
- Subfamily: Vanilloideae
- Tribe: Vanilleae
- Genus: Vanilla; Plumier ex Mill., 1754

Species
- see List of Vanilla species
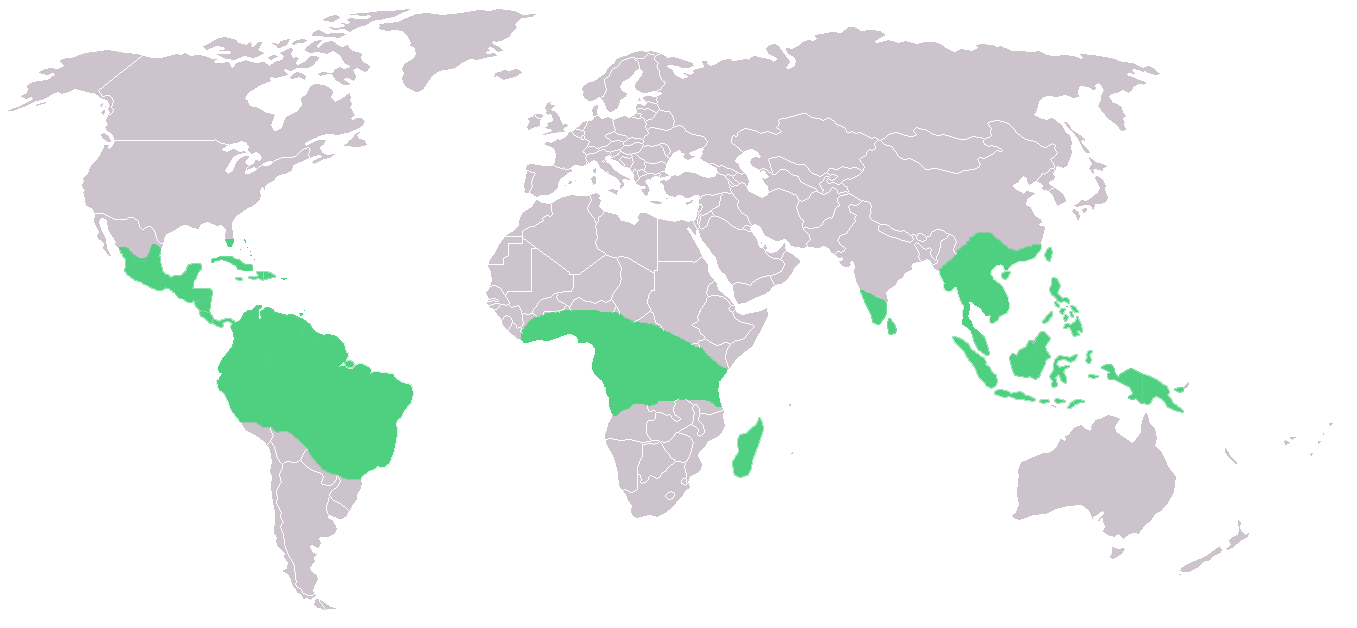
- Green: Distribution of Vanilla species

Synonyms
- Vanillophorum Neck.; Myrobroma Salisb.; Dictyophyllaria Garay; Miguelia Aver.

= Vanilla (genus) =

Genus of flowering plants in the orchid family

Vanilla orchids form the flowering plant genus Vanilla made of about 110 species in the orchid family (Orchidaceae). These orchids are found in tropical and subtropical regions worldwide, from tropical America to tropical Asia, New Guinea and West Africa. Five species are known from the contiguous United States, all limited to southern Florida.

The most widely known member is the flat-leaved vanilla (V. planifolia), native to Mexico and Belize, from which commercial vanilla flavoring is derived. It is the only orchid widely used for industrial purposes in flavoring such products as foods, beverages and cosmetics, and is recognized as the most popular aroma and flavor. The key constituent imparting its flavour is the phenolic aldehyde vanillin.

The genus was established in 1754 by Plumier, after J. Miller. The word vanilla, derived from the diminutive of the Spanish word vaina (vaina itself meaning sheath or pod), simply translates as little pod.

== Description ==
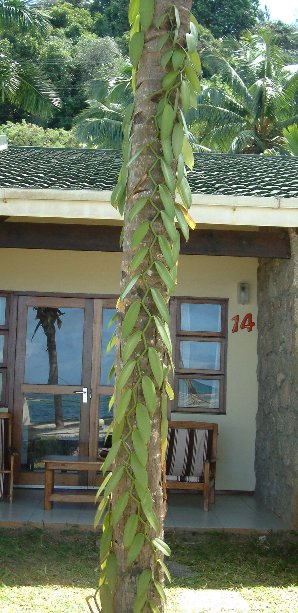
Flat-leaved vanilla (Vanilla planifolia) habitus

This genus of vine-like plants has a monopodial climbing habitus. They can form long thin stems with a length of more than 35 m, with alternate leaves spread along their length. The short, oblong, dark green leaves of Vanilla are thick and leathery, even fleshy in some species. But there are also a significant number of species that have their leaves reduced to scales or have become nearly or totally leafless and appear to use their green climbing stems for photosynthesis. Long and strong aerial roots grow from each node.

Vanilla plantations require trees for the orchids to climb and anchor by its roots.

=== Flowers and fruit ===
The racemose inflorescence's short-lived flowers arise successively on short peduncles from the leaf axils or scales. There may be up to 100 flowers on a single raceme, but usually no less than 20. The flowers are quite large and attractive with white, green, greenish yellow or cream colors. The flowers' sepals and petals are similar. The lip is tubular-shaped and surrounds the long, bristly column, opening up, as the bell of a trumpet, at its apex. The anther is at the top of the column and hangs over the stigma, separated by the rostellum. Most Vanilla flowers have a sweet scent.

Blooming occurs only when the flowers are fully grown. Each flower opens up in the morning and closes late in the afternoon on the same day, never to reopen. If pollination has not occurred meanwhile, it will be shed. The flowers are self-fertile, but need pollinators to perform this task. Pollinated flowers produces elongate, fleshy and later dehiscent capsule fruits 10–20 cm (3.9–7.9 in) long with watery pulp; the fruit ripens gradually for 8 to 9 months after flowering, eventually turning black in color and giving off a strong aroma. Each fruit (or "vanilla bean") —though true beans are fabaceous eudicots not at all closely related to orchids— contains thousands of minute seeds, the entire fruit is harvested by hand for commercially production of vanilla flavoring. Among the Malagasy, the native V. madagascariensis (known as vahinamalo from vahy amalona lit. 'eel vine', or amalo) is an ingredient used in traditional aphrodisiacs.

=== Pollination ===
In the Neotropics, the flowers were historically presumed to be pollinated by stingless bees (e.g. Melipona) or hummingbirds, but this was never confirmed; the only actual documented pollination (i.e., producing seed set) is recorded for an orchid bee, Eulaema meriana, visiting Vanilla grandiflora in Peru, and pollinia of Vanilla species have been observed attached to other species of Eulaema in Panama, and pollinia of Vanilla pompona are carried by males of Eulaema cingulata in Peru. Hand pollination is the most reliable method in commercially grown vanilla.

Vanilla species are used as food plants by the larvae of some Lepidoptera species, such as the woolly bear moths Hypercompe eridanus and H. icasia. Off-season or when abandoned, they may serve as habitat for animals of open forest, e.g. on the Comoros for Robert Mertens's day gecko (Phelsuma robertmertensi).

== Selected species ==
The taxonomy of the genus Vanilla is complex.

This is a partial list of species or synonyms:

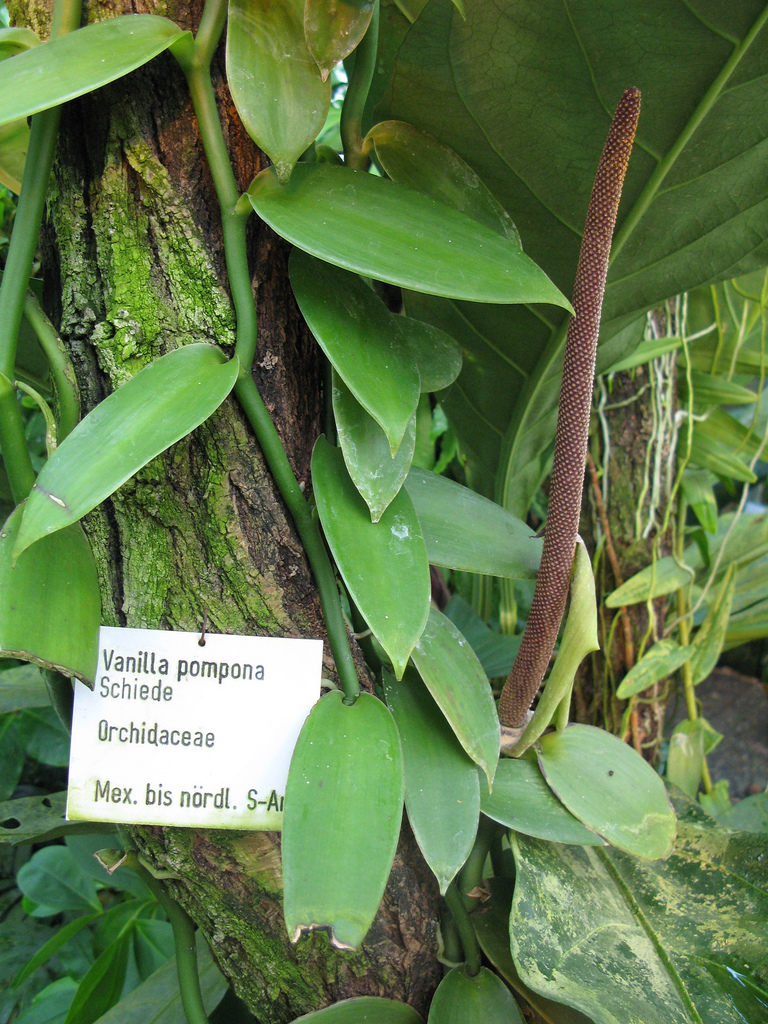
Pompona vanilla (Vanilla pompona)

- Vanilla albida
- Vanilla andamanica
- Vanilla andina
- Vanilla aphylla Blume – Leafless vanilla
- Vanilla atropogon
- Vanilla bahiana
- Vanilla barbellata – Small bearded vanilla, wormvine orchid, "leafless vanilla"
- Vanilla chamissonis Klotzsch – Chamisso's vanilla
- Vanilla claviculata – Green withe
- Vanilla dilloniana – Dillon's vanilla, "leafless vanilla"
- Vanilla edwallii – Edwall's vanilla
- Vanilla humblotii
- Vanilla imperialis
- Vanilla mexicana Mill. – Mexican vanilla
- Vanilla moonii
- Vanilla odorata C.Presl
- Vanilla phaeantha – Leafy vanilla
- Vanilla phalaenopsis Vanille Sauvage (leafless succulent)
- Vanilla pilifera Holttum
- Vanilla planifolia Andrews – Flat-leaved vanilla, Tahitian vanilla, "West Indian vanilla"
- Vanilla poitaei – Poiteau's vanilla
- Vanilla polylepis
- Vanilla pompona Schiede – Pompona vanilla, Guadeloupe vanilla, "West Indian vanilla"
- Vanilla raabii
- Vanilla roscheri
- Vanilla shenzhenica
- Vanilla siamensis – Thai vanilla
- Vanilla somae
- Vanilla walkeriae
- Vanilla × tahitensis

== Aroma and flavor ==
Regarded as the world's most popular aroma and flavor, vanilla contains the phenolic aldehyde vanillin, as well as anisaldehyde, together accounting for its predominant sensory characteristics. Vanilla is a widely used aroma and flavor compound for foods, beverages and cosmetics, as indicated by its popularity as an ice cream flavor.
