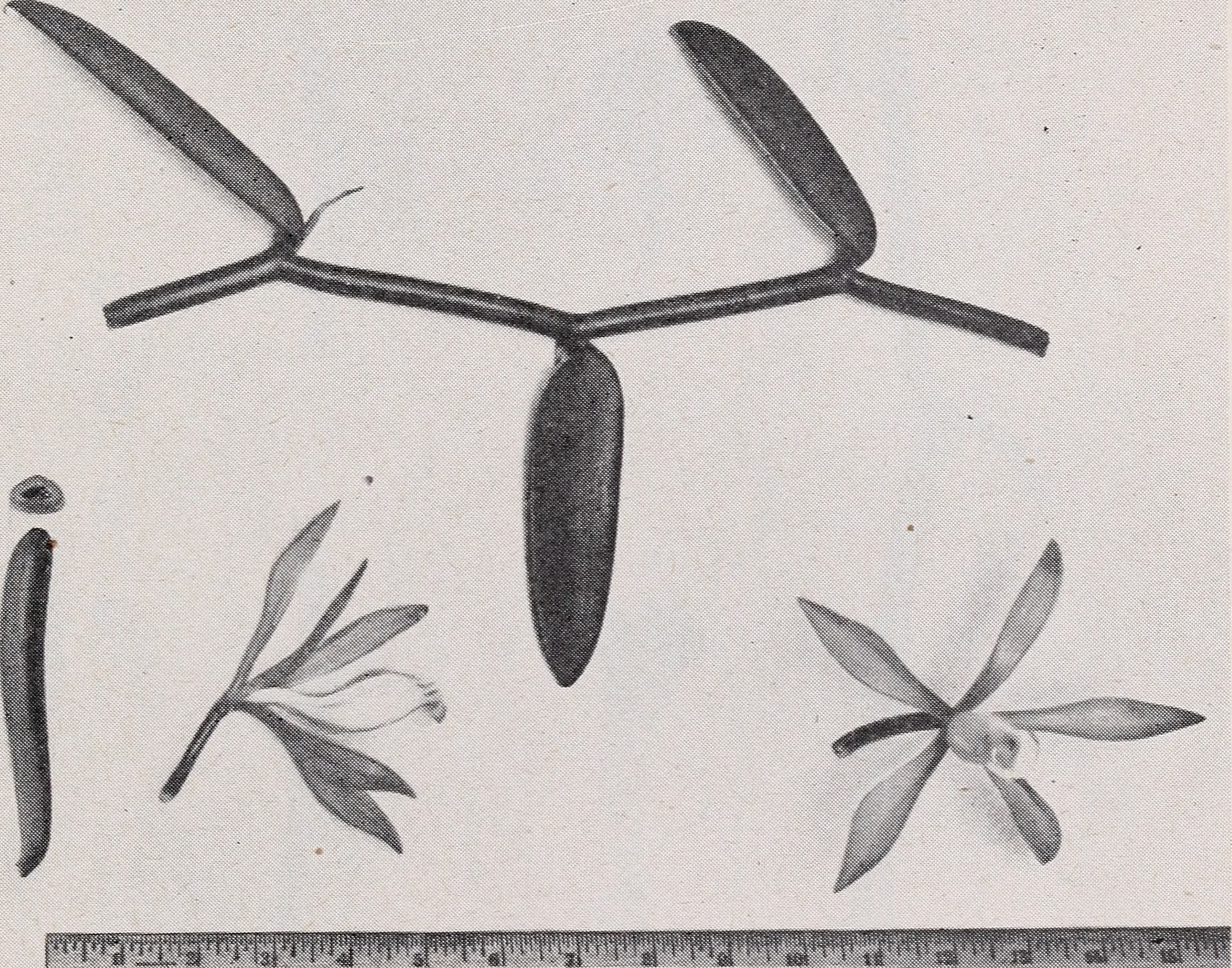

Scientific classification
- Kingdom: Plantae
- Clade: Tracheophytes
- Clade: Angiosperms
- Clade: Monocots
- Order: Asparagales
- Family: Orchidaceae
- Subfamily: Vanilloideae
- Genus: Vanilla
- Species: V. phaeantha

Binomial name
- Vanilla phaeantha Rchb. f.

= Vanilla phaeantha =

Species of orchid

Vanilla phaeantha, common name leafy vanilla or oblong-leaved vanilla, is a plant species known to occur in many areas of the Neotropics, namely in Brazil, Venezuela, Colombia, Trinidad & Tobago, Martinique, Jamaica, Cuba, Panama, Costa Rica, Mexico and also in Collier County, Florida, USA. In Florida it occurs in cypress swamps and hammocks at elevations of less than 20 m (67 feet).

Vanilla phaeantha has persistent, leathery, flat leaves up to 15 cm long, hence about the same length as the internodes or slightly shorter. Flowers are borne in racemes of about 12 flowers, located in the axils of the leaves. Sepals and petals are green, leathery and rigid except for the yellow to cream-colored lip. Fruits are cylindrical, up to 10 cm (4 inches) long and 1 cm (0.4 inches) in diameter.
