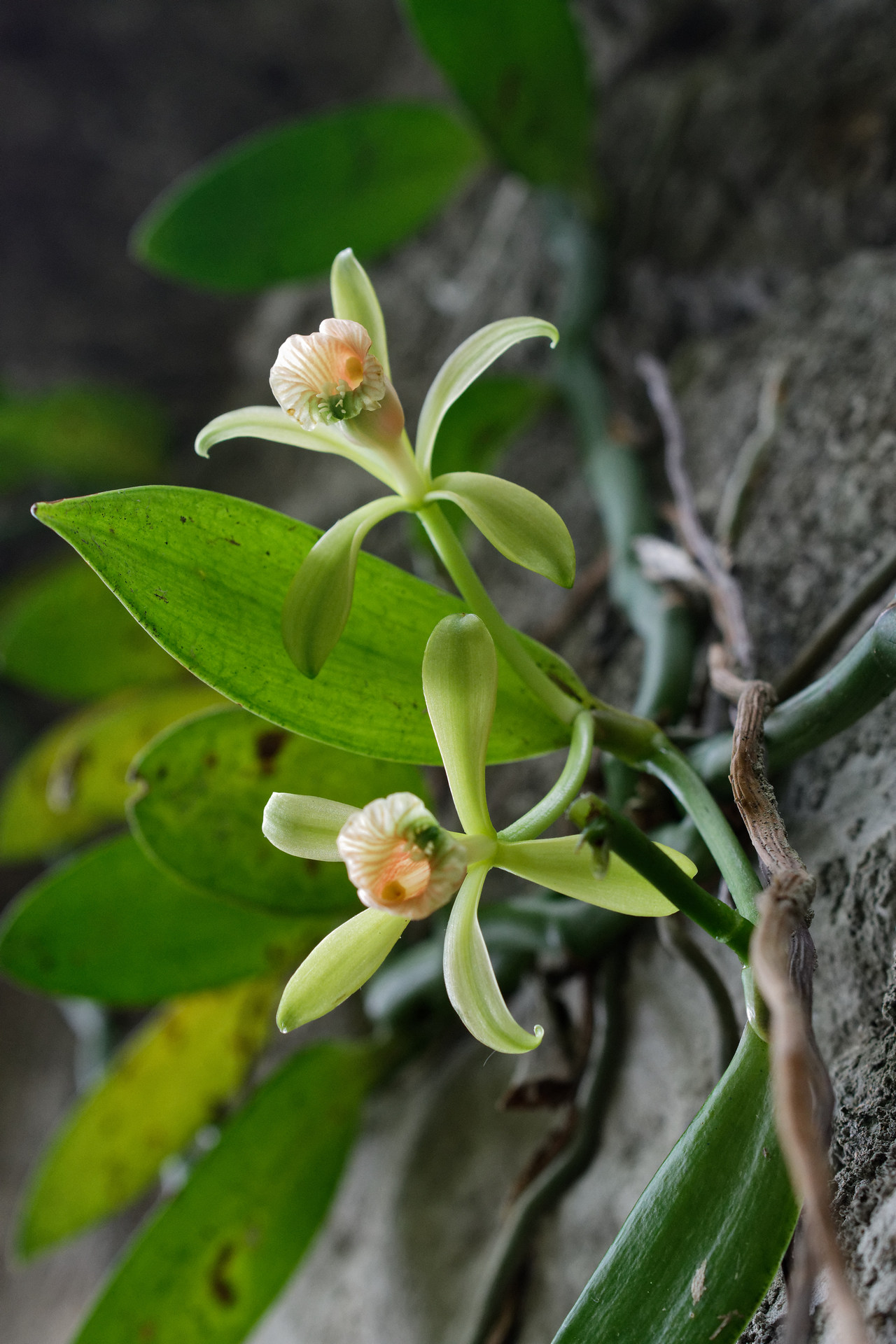

Conservation status
- Endangered (IUCN 3.1)

Scientific classification
- Kingdom: Plantae
- Clade: Tracheophytes
- Clade: Angiosperms
- Clade: Monocots
- Order: Asparagales
- Family: Orchidaceae
- Subfamily: Vanilloideae
- Genus: Vanilla
- Species: V. somae

Binomial name
- Vanilla somae Hayata

Synonyms
- Miguelia somae (Hayata) Aver.; Vanilla albida auct. non Blume; Vanilla griffithii auct. non Rchb.f.; Vanilla griffithii var. formosana Ito; Vanilla griffithii var. ronoensis (Hayata) S.S.Ying; Vanilla ronoensis Hayata; Vanilla somai Hayata

= Vanilla somae =

Species of orchid

Vanilla somae is a species of Vanilla native to the forests of Taiwan, northern Vietnam and Laos. The scientific names Vanilla albida and Vanilla griffithii are sometimes misapplied to this species, but they are actually three different species.
