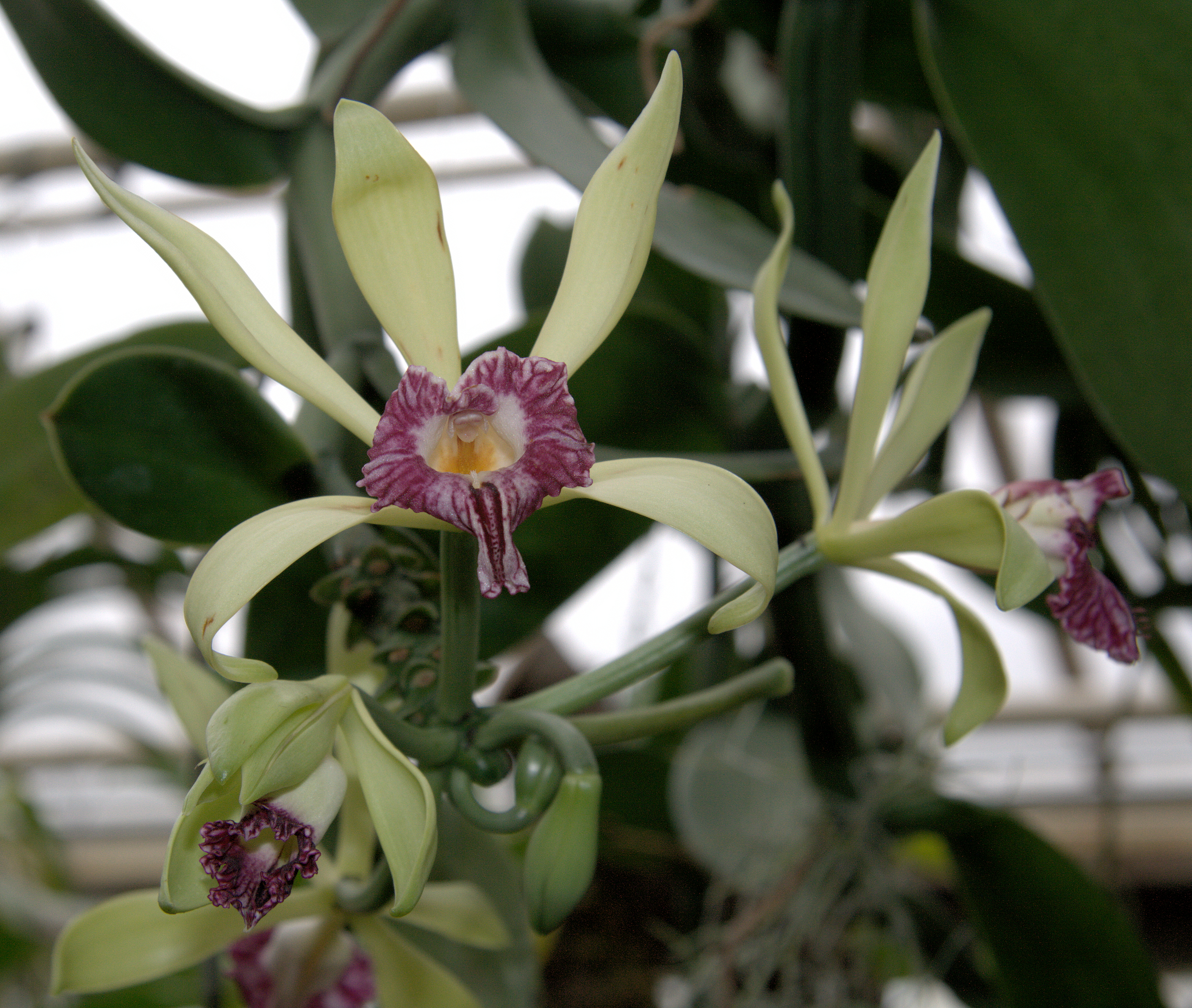

Scientific classification
- Kingdom: Plantae
- Clade: Tracheophytes
- Clade: Angiosperms
- Clade: Monocots
- Order: Asparagales
- Family: Orchidaceae
- Subfamily: Vanilloideae
- Genus: Vanilla
- Species: V. imperialis

Binomial name
- Vanilla imperialis Kraenzl.

= Vanilla imperialis =

Species of orchid from Africa

Vanilla imperialis is an orchid (family Orchidaceae) found from Sierra Leone eastward to Ethiopia and southward to Tanzania and Angola. It is a root-climbing vine to about 65 feet (twenty meters) in height, with a root emerging just above each leaf. Although not as tall as the common vanilla (V. planifolia), it is up to a full inch (2.54 centimeters) in thickness; the most massive Vanilla species, and the largest of all African orchids. The inflorescence is an unbranched raceme up to six inches (15 centimeters) long. The flowers are six inches (16 centimeters) wide with the white or yellow petals and sepals three inches (8 cm) long by 0.75 inch (1.8 cm) in width. The labellum is 2.5 inches (six cm) in length with the far end flared and pink or purple. Most of the labellum is fused to the column, forming a tube. Each flower is open for at least two days( Chambers says seven days).
