= French Polynesia =

French overseas collectivity in the Pacific

French Polynesia Polynésie française (French) Pōrīnetia farāni (Tahitian)
- Overseas country and collectivity of France
- Flag Coat of arms
- Motto: "Liberté, Égalité, Fraternité" (French) (English: "Liberty, Equality, Fraternity") Territorial motto: "Tahiti Nui Māre'are'a" (Tahitian) (English: "Great Tahiti of the Golden Haze")
- Anthem: "La Marseillaise"
- Regional anthem: Ia Ora 'O Tahiti Nui (English: "Long Live Tahiti Nui")
- Location of French Polynesia (circled in red)
- Sovereign state: France
- Protectorate proclaimed: 9 September 1842
- Territorial status: 27 October 1946
- Collectivity status: 28 March 2003
- Country status (nominal title): 27 February 2004
- Capital: Papeete; 17°32′39″S 149°34′10″W
- Largest city: Faʼaʼā
- Official languages: French; Tahitian
- Recognised regional languages: Austral; Raivavae; Rapa; Mangareva; Tuamotuan; Marquesan
- Ethnic groups (1988): 66.5% unmixed Polynesians; 7.1% mixed Polynesians (Note: Polynesians with light European or East Asian mixing.); 9.3% Demis (Note: Mixed European and Polynesian descent.); 11.9% Europeans (Note: Mostly French.); 4.7% East Asians (Note: Mostly Chinese.)
- Demonym(s): French Polynesian
- Government: Devolved parliamentary dependency
  - President of the French Republic: Emmanuel Macron
  - High Commissioner of the Republic: Alexandre Rochatte
  - President of French Polynesia: Moetai Brotherson
  - Vice-President of French Polynesia: Chantal Galenon
- Legislature: Assembly of French Polynesia

French Parliament
  - Senate: 2 senators (of 348)
  - National Assembly: 3 seats (of 577)

Area
  - Total: 4,167 km^{2} (1,609 sq mi)
  - Land: 3,521.2 km^{2} (1,359.5 sq mi)
  - Water (%): 12

Population
  - Aug. 2022 census: 278,786 (175th)
  - Density: 79/km^{2} (204.6/sq mi) (130th)
- GDP (PPP): estimate
  - Total: $6.007 billion (2024 est.) $5.935 billion (2023 est.) $5.892 billion (2022 est.)
  - Per capita: $23,300 (2024 est.) $22,800 (2023 est.) $20,700 (2022 est.)
- GDP (nominal): 2019 estimate
  - Total: USD 6.02 billion
  - Per capita: USD 21,673
- Currency: CFP franc (₣) (XPF)
- Time zone: UTC−10:00; UTC−09:30 (Marquesas Islands); UTC−09:00 (Gambier Islands)
- Date format: dd/mm/yyyy
- Mains electricity: 110 V–60 Hz; 220 V–60 Hz
- Driving side: Right
- Calling code: +689
- INSEE code: 987
- ISO 3166 code: PF; FR-PF; PYF
- Internet TLD: .pf

French Polynesia (/ˌpɒlɪˈniːʒə/ POL-ih-NEE-zhə; French: Polynésie française [pɔlinezi fʁɑ̃sɛːz]; Tahitian: Pōrīnetia farāni) is an overseas collectivity of France and its sole overseas country; it is classified as a non-self-governing territory by the United Nations. It comprises 121 geographically dispersed islands and atolls stretching over more than 2,000 kilometres (1,200 mi) in the South Pacific Ocean. French Polynesia is associated with the European Union as an overseas country and territory (OCT). The total land area of French Polynesia is 3,521 square kilometres (1,359 sq mi), with a population of 282,596 as of September 2025 of which at least 205,000 live in the Society Islands and the remaining population lives in the rest of the archipelago.

French Polynesia is divided into five island groups: the Austral Islands; the Gambier Islands; the Marquesas Islands; the Society Islands (comprising the Leeward and Windward Islands); and the Tuamotus. Among its 121 islands and atolls, 75 were inhabited at the 2017 census. Tahiti, which is in the Society Islands group, is the most populous island, home to nearly 69% of the population of French Polynesia as of 2017. Papeete, located on Tahiti, is the capital of French Polynesia. Although not an integral part of its territory, Clipperton Island was administered from French Polynesia until 2007.

Hundreds of years after the Great Polynesian Migration, European explorers began traveling through the region, visiting the islands of French Polynesia on several occasions. Traders and whaling ships also visited. In 1842, the French took over the islands and established a French protectorate that they called Établissements français d'Océanie (EFO; French Establishments/Settlements of Oceania).

In 1946, the EFO became an overseas territory under the constitution of the French Fourth Republic, and Polynesians were granted the right to vote through citizenship. In 1957, the territory was renamed French Polynesia. In 1983, it became a member of the Pacific Community, a regional development organization. Since 28 March 2003, French Polynesia has been an overseas collectivity of the French Republic under the constitutional revision of article 74, and later gained, with law 2004-192 of 27 February 2004, an administrative autonomy, two symbolic manifestations of which are the title of the President of French Polynesia and its additional designation as an overseas country.

== History ==
Anthropologists and historians believe the Great Polynesian Migration commenced around 1500 BC as Austronesian peoples went on a journey using celestial navigation to find islands in the South Pacific Ocean. The first islands of French Polynesia to be settled were the Marquesas Islands in about 200 BC. The Polynesians later ventured southwest and discovered the Society Islands around AD 300.

European encounters began in 1521 when Portuguese explorer Ferdinand Magellan, sailing at the service of the Spanish Crown, sighted Puka-Puka in the Tuāmotu-Gambier Archipelago. In 1606 another Spanish expedition under Pedro Fernandes de Queirós sailed through Polynesia sighting an inhabited island on 10 February which they called Sagitaria (or Sagittaria), probably the island of Rekareka to the southeast of Tahiti. In 1722, Dutchman Jakob Roggeveen while on an expedition sponsored by the Dutch West India Company, charted the location of six islands in the Tuamotu Archipelago and two islands in the Society Islands, one of which was Bora Bora.

British explorer Samuel Wallis became the first European navigator to visit Tahiti in 1767. French explorer Louis Antoine de Bougainville also visited Tahiti in 1768, while British explorer James Cook arrived in 1769, and observed the transit of Venus. He would stop in Tahiti again in 1773 during his second voyage to the Pacific, and once more in 1777 during his third and last voyage before being killed in Hawaii.

In 1772, the Spanish Viceroy of Peru Don Manuel de Amat ordered a number of expeditions to Tahiti under the command of Domingo de Bonechea who was the first European to explore all of the main islands beyond Tahiti. A short-lived Spanish settlement was created in 1774, and for a time some maps bore the name Isla de Amat after Viceroy Amat. Christian missions began with Spanish priests who stayed in Tahiti for a year. Protestants from the London Missionary Society settled permanently in Polynesia in 1797.

Society Island kingdoms

King Pōmare II of Tahiti was forced to flee to Mo'orea in 1803; he and his subjects were converted to Protestantism in 1812. French Catholic missionaries arrived on Tahiti in 1834; their expulsion in 1836 caused France to send a gunboat in 1838. In 1842, Tahiti and Tahuata were declared a French protectorate, to allow Catholic missionaries to work undisturbed. The capital of Papeetē was founded in 1843. In 1880, France annexed Tahiti, changing the status from that of a protectorate to that of a colony. The island groups were not officially united until the establishment of the French protectorate in 1889.

After France declared a protectorate over Tahiti in 1842 and fought a war with Tahiti (1844–1847), the British and French signed the Jarnac Convention in 1847, declaring that the kingdoms of Raiatea, Huahine and Bora Bora were to remain independent from both powers and that no single chief was to be allowed to reign over the entire archipelago. France eventually broke the agreement, and the islands were annexed and became a colony in 1888 (eight years after the Windward Islands) after many native resistances and conflicts called the Leewards War, lasting until 1897.

In the 1880s, France claimed the Tuamotu Archipelago, which formerly belonged to the Pōmare Dynasty, without formally annexing it. Having declared a protectorate over Tahuata in 1842, the French regarded the entire Marquesas Islands as French. In 1885, France appointed a governor and established a general council, thus giving it the proper administration for a colony. The islands of Rimatara and Rūrutu unsuccessfully lobbied for British protection in 1888, so in 1889 they were annexed by France. Postage stamps were first issued in the colony in 1892. The first official name for the colony was Établissements de l'Océanie (Establishments in Oceania); in 1903 the general council was changed to an advisory council, and the colony's name was changed to Établissements français de l'Océanie (French Establishments in Oceania).

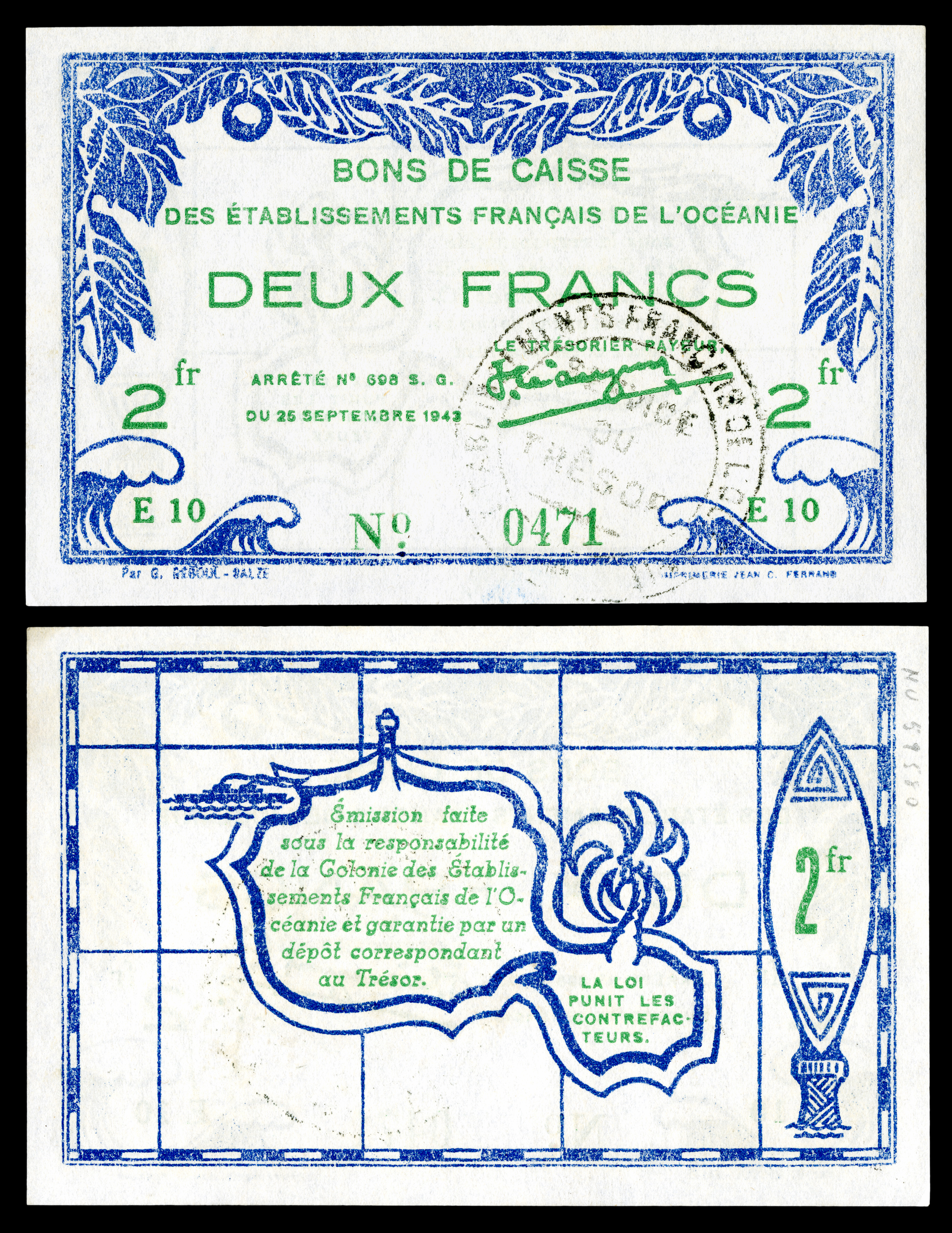
A two-franc World War II emergency-issue banknote (1943), printed in Papeete, and depicting the outline of Tahiti on the reverse

In 1940, the administration of French Polynesia recognised the Free French Forces, and many Polynesians served in World War II, primarily in North Africa and parts of Italy. Unknown at the time to the French and Polynesians, the Konoe Cabinet in Imperial Japan on 16 September 1940 included French Polynesia among the many territories which were to become Japanese possessions, as part of the "Eastern Pacific Government-General" in the post-war world. However, in the course of the war in the Pacific the Japanese were not able to launch an actual invasion of the French islands.

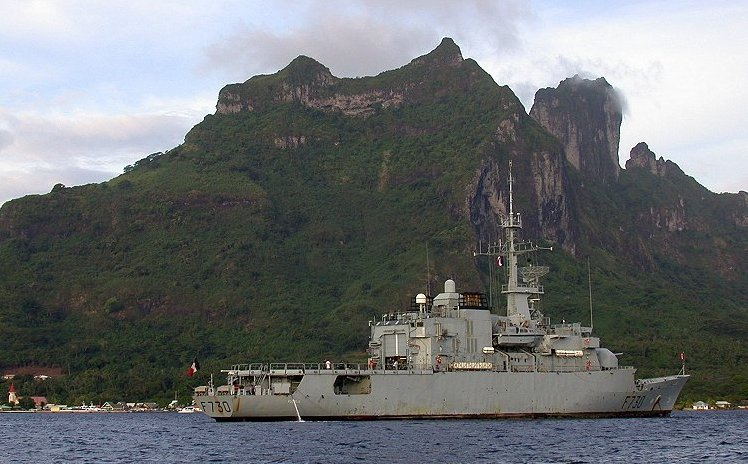
The French frigate Floréal in November 2002, at anchor in Bora Bora lagoon

In 1946, Polynesians were granted French citizenship and the islands' status was changed to an overseas territory. The islands' name was changed in 1957 to Polynésie Française (French Polynesia). In 1962, France's early nuclear testing ground in Algeria was no longer usable when Algeria became independent and the Moruroa atoll in the Tuamotu Archipelago was selected as the new testing site. Nuclear tests were conducted underground after 1974. In 1977, French Polynesia was granted partial internal autonomy; in 1984, the autonomy was extended. French Polynesia became a full overseas collectivity of France in 2003.

In September 1995, France stirred up widespread protests by resuming nuclear testing at Fangataufa atoll after a three-year moratorium. The last test was on 27 January 1996. On 29 January 1996, France announced that it would accede to the Comprehensive Test Ban Treaty, and no longer test nuclear weapons.

French Polynesia was relisted in the United Nations list of non-self-governing territories in 2013, making it eligible for a UN-backed independence referendum. The relisting was made after the indigenous opposition was voiced and supported by the Polynesian Leaders Group, Pacific Conference of Churches, Women's International League for Peace and Freedom, Non-Aligned Movement, World Council of Churches, and Melanesian Spearhead Group.

== Governance ==
Under the terms of Article 74 of the French constitution and the Organic Law 2014–192 on the statute of autonomy of French Polynesia, politics of French Polynesia takes place in a framework of a parliamentary representative democratic French overseas collectivity, whereby the President of French Polynesia is the head of government, and of a multi-party system. Executive power is exercised by the government. Legislative power is vested in both the government and the Assembly of French Polynesia (the territorial assembly).

Political life in French Polynesia was marked by great instability from the mid-2000s to the mid-2010s. The anti-independence right-wing president of French Polynesia, Gaston Flosse, who had been in power since 1991, had supported the resumption of the French nuclear weapons tests in 1995. Furthermore, he had obtained from his longtime friend and political ally Jacques Chirac, then president of France, a status of expanded autonomy for French Polynesia in 2004. He failed to secure an absolute majority in the 2004 French Polynesian legislative election, resulting in deadlock at the Assembly of French Polynesia. Flosse's longtime opponent, the pro-independence leader Oscar Temaru, whose pro-independence coalition had won one less seat than Flosse's party in the Assembly, was elected president of French Polynesia by the Assembly in June 2004 thanks to the votes of two non-aligned Assembly members. This resulted in several years of political instability, as neither the pro- nor the anti-independence camps were assured of a majority, depending on the votes of smaller non-aligned parties representing the interests of the distant islands of French Polynesia (as opposed to Tahiti). Several constructive votes of no confidence were passed against the presidency, resulting in it shuffling between Temaru and Flosse until December 2006, when Temaru was succeeded by Gaston Tong Sang, a close ally of Flosse.

On 14 September 2007, Temaru was elected president of French Polynesia for the third time in three years (with 27 of 44 votes cast in the Assembly). He replaced anti-independence leader Gaston Tong Sang, who on 31 August had lost a no confidence vote in the Assembly, after Flosse, hitherto opposed to independence, supported Temaru to topple the Tong Sang government. Temaru, however, had no stable majority in the Assembly, and new elections were held in February 2008 in an attempt to solve the political crisis.

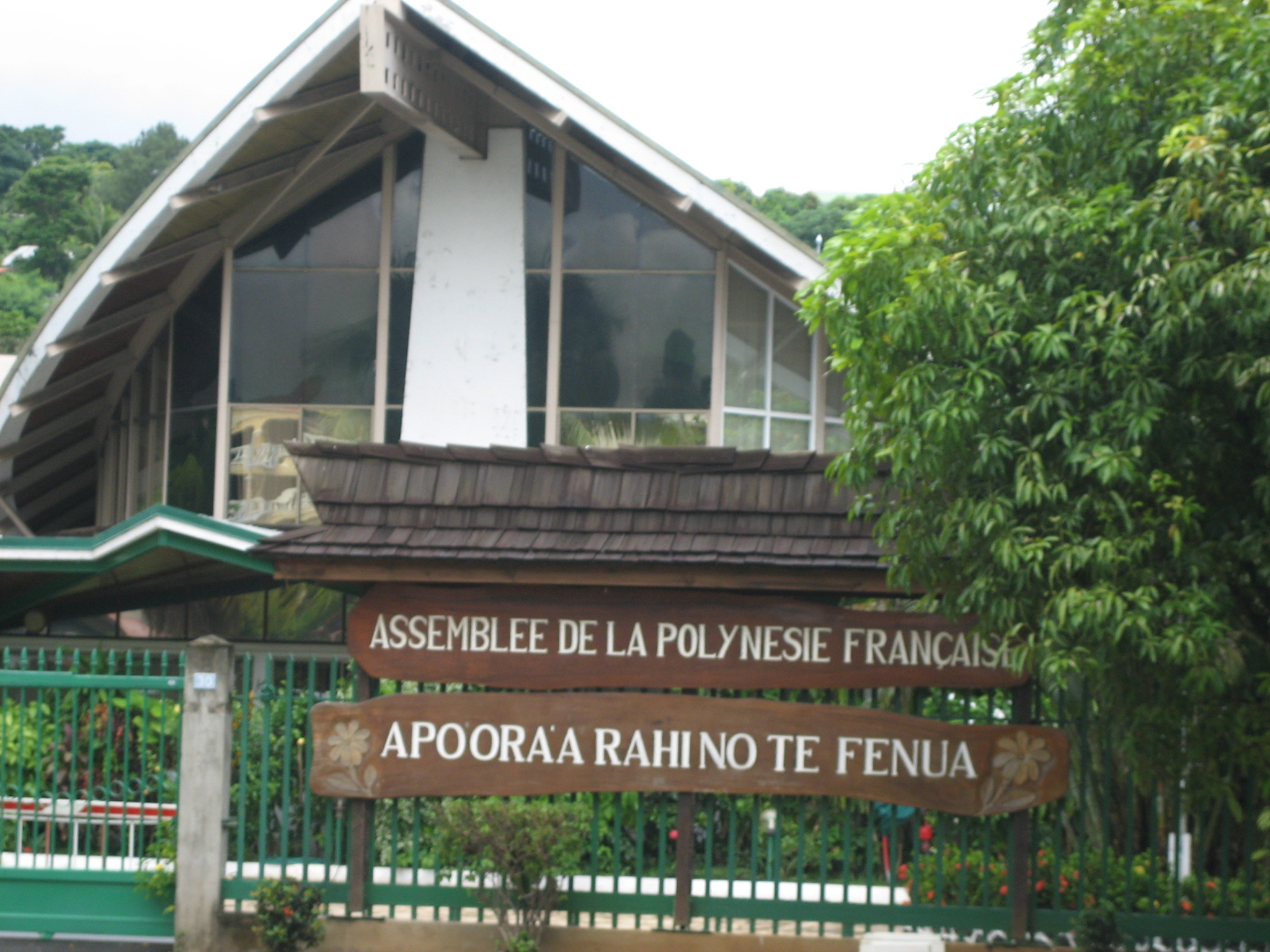
The Assembly of French Polynesia

Tong Sang's political party, Tāhōʻēraʻa Huiraʻatira, won the territorial elections. The two minority parties of Temaru and Flosse, who together had one more member in the Assembly than did Tāhōʻēraʻa Huiraʻatira, formed an alliance to prevent Tong Sang from becoming president again. Flosse was then elected president of French Polynesia by the territorial assembly on 23 February 2008 with the support of the pro-independence party led by Temaru, while Temaru was elected speaker of the territorial assembly with the support of the anti-independence party led by Flosse. Both formed a coalition cabinet. Many observers doubted that the alliance between anti-independence Flosse and pro-independence Temaru could last very long.

At the French municipal elections held in March 2008, several prominent mayors who were members of the Flosse–Temaru coalition lost their offices in key municipalities of French Polynesia, which was interpreted as a disapproval of how the alliance had prevented Tong Sang (whose party French Polynesian voters had placed first in the territorial elections the month before) from becoming president of French Polynesia. Only a month later, on 15 April 2008, the coalition government was toppled—by a constructive vote of no confidence in the territorial assembly—when two members of the Flosse–Temaru coalition left the coalition and sided with Tong Sang's party. Tong Sang's majority in the territorial assembly was very narrow, and he was toppled in February 2009, succeeded again by Temaru, who was still supported by Flosse.

Temaru's return to power was brief as he fell out with Flosse and was toppled in November 2009, succeeded by his predecessor, Tong Sang. Tong Sang remained in power for a year and a half before being toppled in a vote of no confidence in April 2011, and succeeded again by Temaru. Temaru's fifth stint as president of French Polynesia lasted two years, during which time he campaigned for the re-inscription of French Polynesia on the United Nations list of non-self-governing territories. Temaru's party, Tāvini Huiraʻatira, lost the 2013 French Polynesian legislative election by a wide margin, only two weeks before the United Nations re-registered French Polynesia on its list of non-self governing territories. This was interpreted by political analysts as a rejection by French Polynesian voters of Temaru's push for independence as well as the consequence of the socioeconomic crisis affecting French Polynesia after years of political instability and corruption scandals.

Flosse, whose anti-independence party won a majority of seats in the 2013 election, succeeded Temaru as president of French Polynesia in May 2013, but he was removed from office in September 2014 due to a corruption conviction by France's highest court. Flosse was replaced as president of French Polynesia by his second-in-command in the anti-independence camp, Édouard Fritch, who was also Flosse's former son-in-law (divorced from Flosse's daughter). Fritch fell out with Flosse in 2015 as both leaders were vying for control of the anti-independence camp, and Fritch was excluded from Flosse's party in September 2015, before founding his own anti-independence party, Tāpura Huiraʻatira, in February 2016. His new party managed to keep a majority in the Assembly, and Fritch remained as president.

Political stability returned to French Polynesia following the split of the anti-independence camp in 2016. Tāpura Huiraʻatira won 70% of the seats in the Assembly of French Polynesia at the 2018 French Polynesian legislative election—defeating both Temaru's pro-independence party and Flosse's anti-independence party—and Édouard Fritch was re-elected president of French Polynesia by the Assembly in May 2018. By 2022, Édouard Fritch was the longest-serving president of French Polynesia since his former father-in-law Flosse in the 1990s and early 2000s.

=== Legal status ===
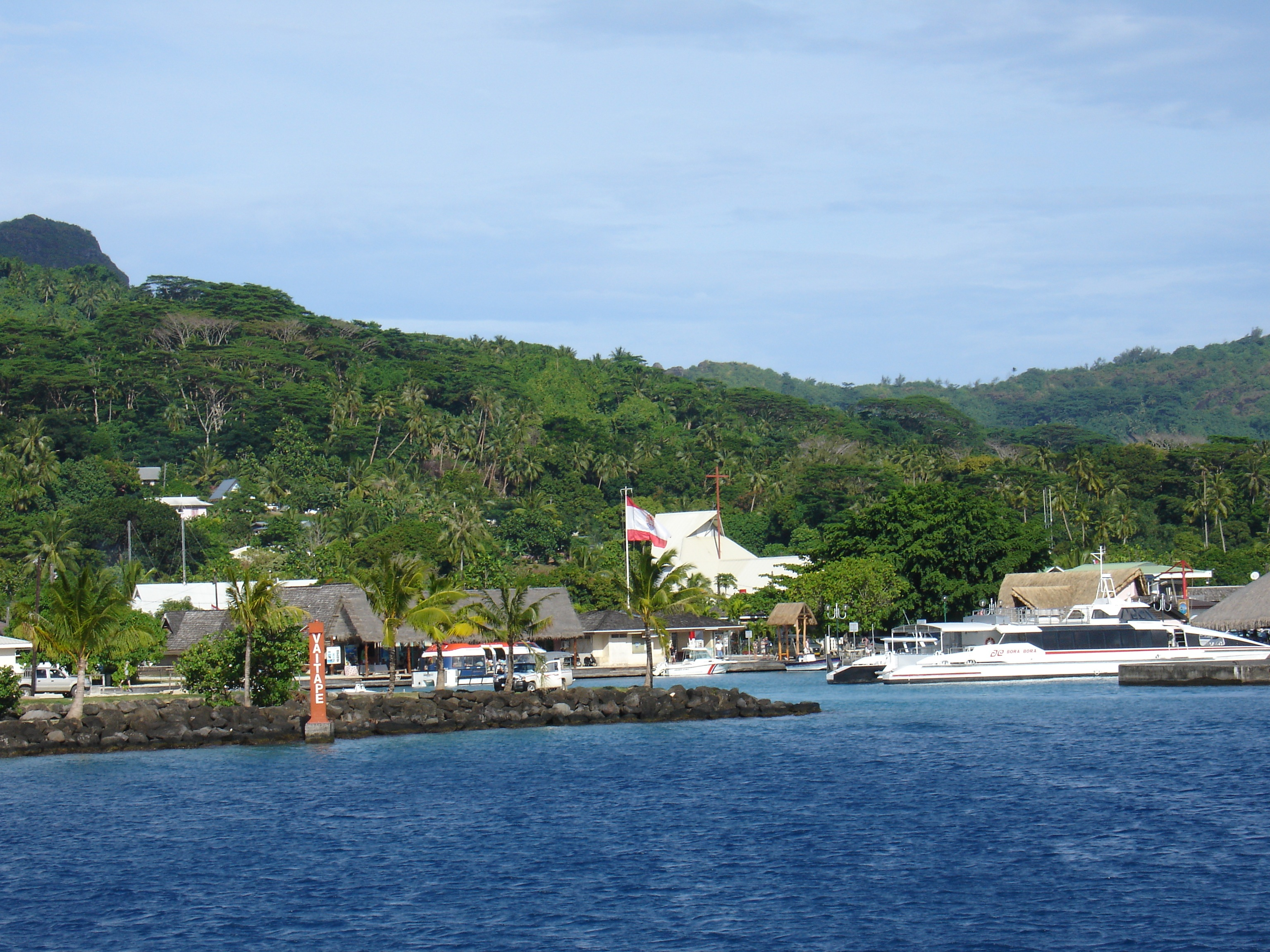
Bora Bora

Between 1946 and 2003, French Polynesia had the status of an overseas territory (territoire d'outre-mer, or TOM). In 2003, it became an overseas collectivity (collectivité d'outre-mer, or COM). Its statutory law of 27 February 2004 gives it the particular designation of "overseas country within the Republic" (pays d'outre-mer au sein de la République, or POM), but without legal modification of its status.

In October 2026, the Fourth Committee of the UN General Assembly approved a draft resolution on French Polynesia, reaffirming the right of its people to self-determination.

=== Relations with mainland France ===
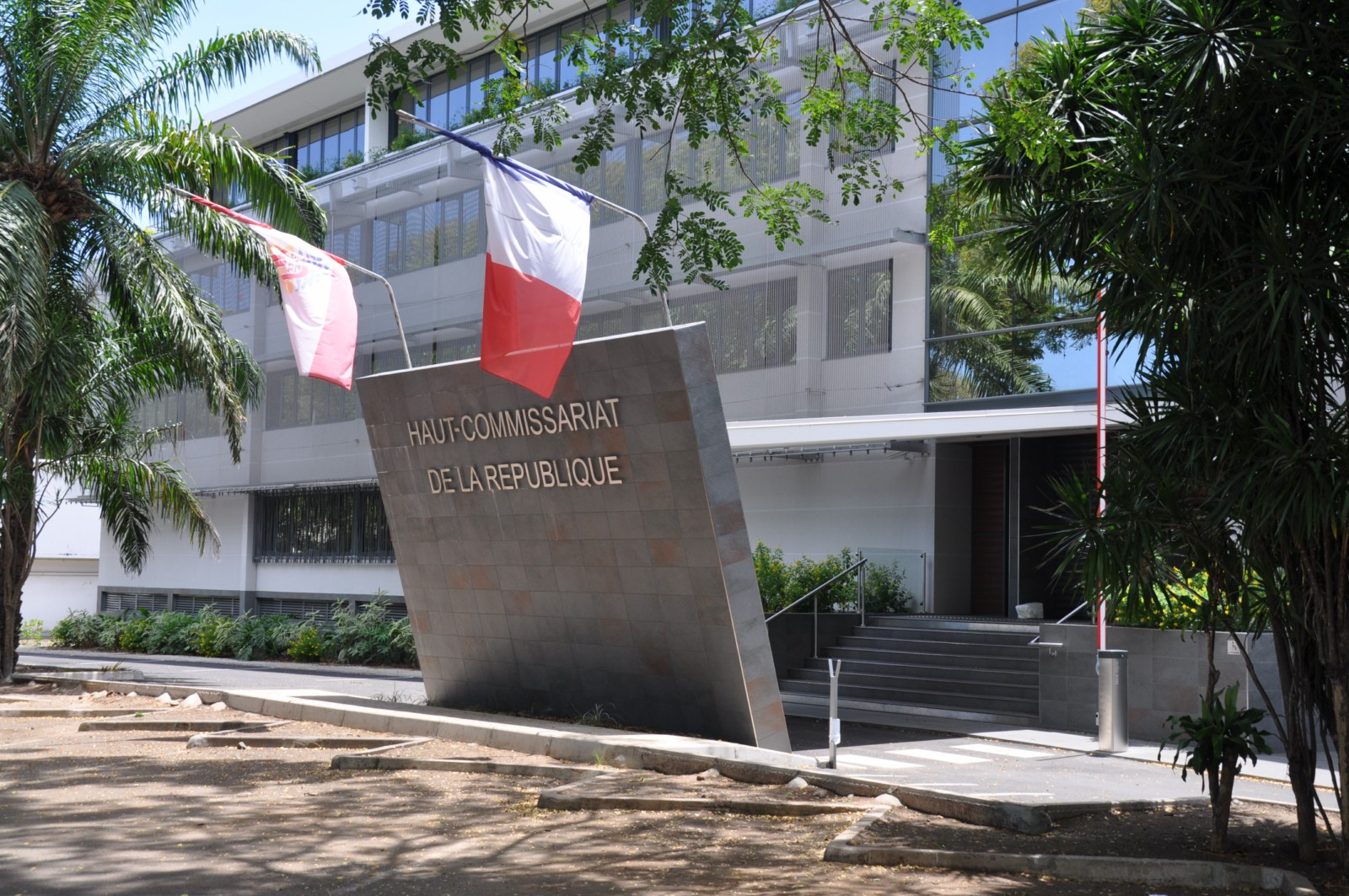
High Commission of the French Republic in Papeete

Despite having a local assembly and government, French Polynesia is not in a free association with France, like the Cook Islands with New Zealand. As a French overseas collectivity, the French central government has direct responsibility for justice, university education, defense (including the National Gendarmerie and French military forces) and foreign affairs. The local government of French Polynesia retains control over primary and secondary education, health, town planning, and the environment. The High Commissioner of the Republic in French Polynesia (French: Haut commissaire de la République en Polynésie française) represents the French state in the territory.

French Polynesia sends three deputies to the French National Assembly in three constituencies, the 1st representing Papeete and its north-eastern suburbs, plus the commune (municipality) of Mo'orea-Mai'ao, the Tuāmotu-Gambier administrative division, and the Marquesas Islands administrative division, the 2nd representing much of Tahiti outside Papeete and the Austral Islands administrative subdivision, and the 3rd representing the Leeward Islands administrative subdivision and the south-western suburbs of Papeete. French Polynesia also sends two senators to the French Senate.

==== Defence ====
The defence of the collectivity is the responsibility of the French Armed Forces. Some 900 military personnel are deployed in the territory — incorporating the Pacific-Polynesian Marine Infantry Regiment (RIMaP-P) — along with modest air transport and surveillance assets. The latter include three Falcon 50 aircraft from French Naval Aviation. These aircraft are to be replaced by the new Falcon 2000 Albatros starting in about 2030. The former is composed of two CN-235 tactical transport aircraft drawn from the Air Force's ET 82 "Maine" transport squadron.

As of mid-2024, three principal French Navy vessels are based in the territory, including the surveillance frigate Prairial, the patrol and support ship Bougainville, and Teriieroo to Teriierooiterai, a vessel of the new Félix Éboué class of patrol vessels. In 2027 a second vessel of the Félix Éboué class, Philip Bernardino, is to be deployed in Tahiti to further reinforce France's maritime surveillance capabilities in the region. As of 2025, the coastal tug (RPC), Manini, was operational in the territory and she is eventually to be replaced and/or complemented by two RP10-class harbour tugboats.

As of 2025, Flottilla 35F of French Naval Aviation deploys a detachment of two AS 365N Dauphin helicopters in Tahiti. The helicopters carry out a variety of roles in the territory, and may be embarked on the frigate Prairial as needed.

The National Gendarmerie (which also polices rural and border areas in metropolitan France) deploys some 500 active personnel and civilians, plus around 150 reservists, in French Polynesia. The patrol boat Jasmin of the Maritime Gendarmerie is also based in the territory and is to be replaced by a new PCG-NG patrol boat in the latter 2020s.

== Geography ==
Map of French Polynesia

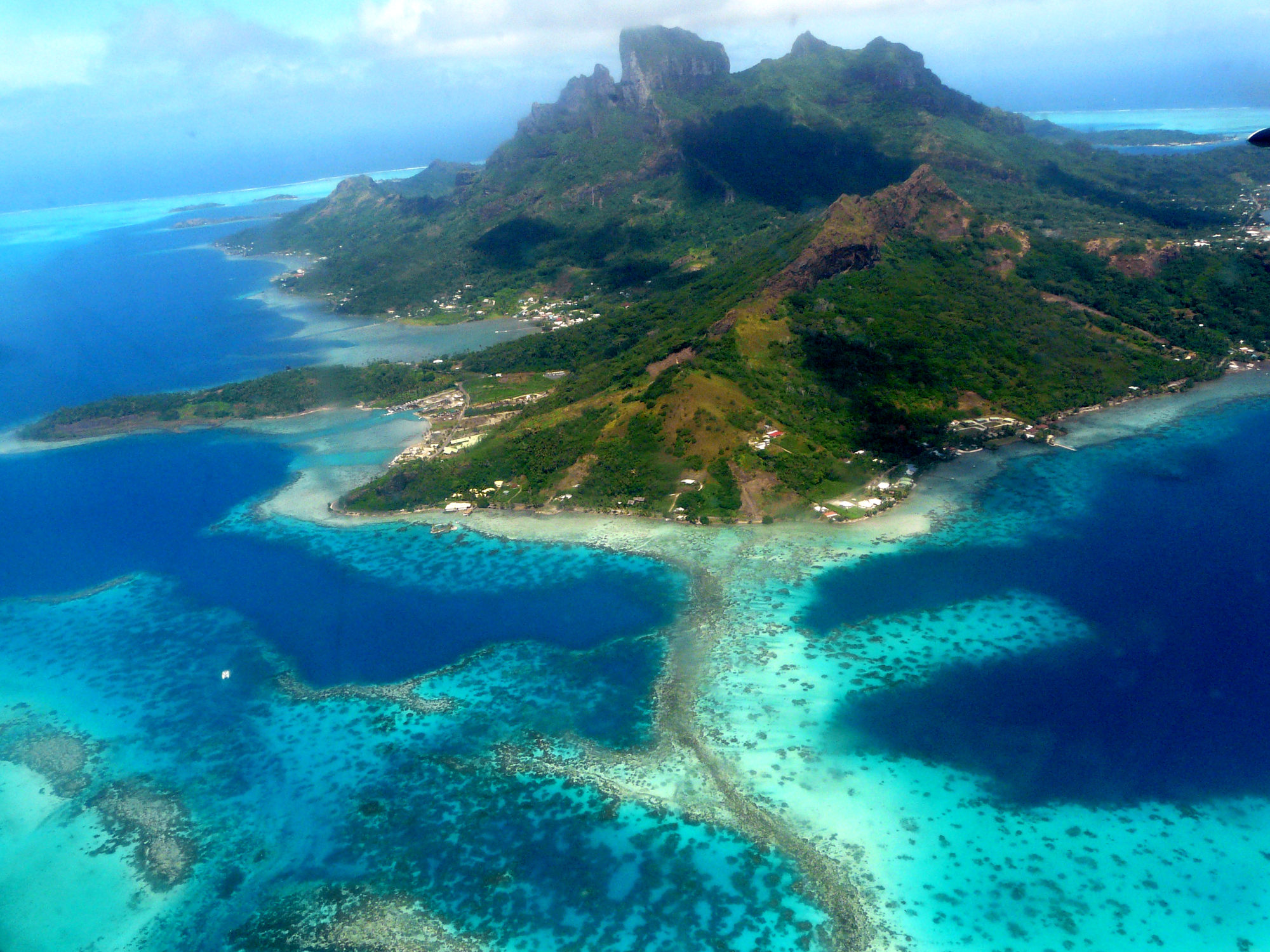
Bora Bora, Leeward Islands

The islands of French Polynesia make up a total land area of 3,521 square kilometres (1,359 sq mi), scattered over more than 2,000 km (1,200 miles) of ocean. There are 121 islands in French Polynesia and many more islets or motus around atolls. The highest point is Mount Orohena on Tahiti.

It is made up of five archipelagos. The largest and most populated island is Tahiti, in the Society Islands.

Aside from Tahiti, some other important atolls, islands, and island groups in French Polynesia are: Ahē, Bora Bora, Hiva ʻOa, Huahine, Maiʻao, Maupiti, Mehetiʻa, Moʻorea, Nuku Hiva, Raʻiātea, Tahaʻa, Tetiʻaroa, Tubuai and Tūpai.

French Polynesia is home to four terrestrial ecoregions: Marquesas tropical moist forests, Society Islands tropical moist forests, Tuamotu tropical moist forests, and Tubuai tropical moist forests.

Islands of French Polynesia
Name	Land area (km^{2})	Population 2022 Census	Density (per km^{2}) 2022	Notes
Marquesas Islands	1,049.3	9,478	9	12 high islands; administratively making the Marquesas Islands subdivision
Society Islands	1,597.6	245,987	154	Administratively subdivided into the Windward Islands subdivision (4 high islands and 1 atoll) and the Leeward Islands subdivision (5 high islands and 4 atolls)
Tuamotu Archipelago	698.7	15,159	22	80 atolls, grouping over 3,100 islands or islets; administratively part of the Tuamotu-Gambier subdivision
Gambier Islands	27.8	1,570	56	6 high islands and 1 atoll; administratively part of the Tuamotu-Gambier subdivision
Austral Islands	147.8	6,592	45	5 high islands and 1 atoll; administratively part of the Austral Islands subdivision
Total	3,521.2	278,786	79	121 high islands and atolls (75 inhabited at the 2017 census; 46 uninhabited)

== Administrative divisions ==
The 5 administrative subdivisions and 48 communes of French Polynesia.

French Polynesia is divided in five administrative subdivisions (subdivisions administratives):

- Marquesas Islands (French: les îles Marquises or officially la subdivision administrative des îles Marquises)
- Leeward Islands (French: les îles Sous-le-Vent or officially la subdivision administrative des îles Sous-le-Vent) (the two subdivisions administratives Windward Islands and Leeward Islands are part of the Society Islands)
- Windward Islands (French: les îles du Vent or officially la subdivision administrative des îles du Vent) (the two subdivisions administratives Windward Islands and Leeward Islands are part of the Society Islands)
- Tuāmotu-Gambier (French: les Îles Tuamotu-Gambier or officially la subdivision administrative des îles Tuamotu-Gambier) (the Tuamotus and the Gambier Islands)
- Austral Islands (French: les îles Australes or officially la subdivision administrative des îles Australes) (including the Bass Islands)

The five administrative subdivisions are not local councils; they are solely deconcentrated subdivisions of the French central State. At the head of each administrative subdivision is an administrateur d'État ('State administrator'), generally simply known as administrateur, also sometimes called chef de la subdivision administrative ('head of the administrative subdivision'). The administrateur is a civil servant under the authority of the High Commissioner of the French Republic in French Polynesia in Papeete.

Four administrative subdivisions (Marquesas Islands, Leeward Islands, Tuamotu-Gambier, and Austral Islands) each also form a deconcentrated subdivision of the government of French Polynesia. These are called circonscriptions ('districts'). The head of a circonscription is the tavana hau, known as administrateur territorial in French ('territorial administrator'), but the Tahitian title tavana hau is most often used. The president of French Polynesia's government appoints the tavana hau, who directly reports to the president. The Windward Islands, due to their proximity to Papeete, do not form a deconcentrated subdivision of the government of French Polynesia.

The 5 administrative subdivisions are themselves divided in 48 communes. Like all other communes in the French Republic, these are municipalities in which local residents with either a French or another EU citizenship elect a municipal council and a mayor in charge of managing local affairs within the commune. Municipal elections occur every six years on the same date as in the rest of the French Republic (the last municipal elections took place in 2020).

Top three largest communes
Commune	Island	Population (2022)
Faʻaʻā	Tahiti	29,826
Punaʻauia	Tahiti	28,781
Papeete	Tahiti	26,654

30 communes are further subdivided in 98 associated communes which have each a delegate mayor and a registry office. These 30 communes were subdivided in associated communes either because they have a large land territory (particularly in the larger islands such as Tahiti or Nuku Hiva) or because they are made up of atolls distant from each other (particularly in the Tuamotu archipelago), which led to the creation of associated communes for each inhabited atoll.

17 communes (out of French Polynesia's 48 communes) have banded together in three separate communities of communes. These indirectly elected intercommunal councils are still relatively new in French Polynesia, and unlike in metropolitan France and its overseas regions it is not mandatory for the communes in French Polynesia to join an intercommunal council. The three intercommunal councils in existence as of 2022, all formed on a voluntary basis, were:

- community of communes of the Marquesas Islands (French: communauté de communes des îles Marquises, or CODIM), formed in 2010 by all the communes in the administrative subdivision of the Marquesas Islands
- community of communes Havaʻi (French: communauté de communes Havaʻi, or CCH), formed in 2012 by all the communes in the administrative subdivision of the Leeward Islands, with the exception of Bora-Bora which preferred to remain separate for financial reasons
- community of communes Terehēamanu (French: communauté de communes Terehēamanu), formed in 2021 by 5 exurban and rural communes on the eastern side of the island of Tahiti: Hitiaa O Te Ra, Taiarapu-Est, Taiarapu-Ouest, Teva I Uta, and Papara.

These communities of communes, as elsewhere in the French Republic, are not full-fledged territorial collectivities, but only federations of communes. From a legal standpoint, the only territorial collectivities in French Polynesia are the overseas collectivity of French Polynesia and the 48 communes.

== Demographics ==
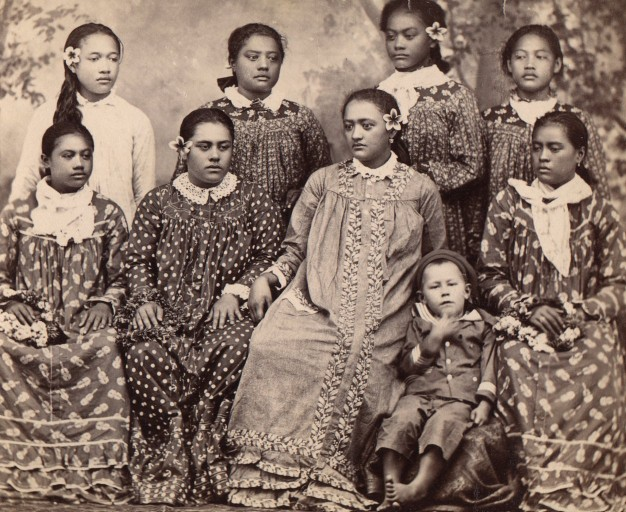
Tahitian girls, c. 1860–1879

Total population was 278,786 according to the 18 August 2022 census, 68.7% of whom lived on the island of Tahiti alone. The urban area of Papeete, the capital city, has 136,771 inhabitants (2017 census).

At the 2017 census, 89.0% of people living in French Polynesia had been born there (up from 87.3% in 2007); 8.1% had been born in Metropolitan France (down from 9.3% in 2007); 1.2% were born elsewhere in overseas France (down from 1.4% in 2007); and 1.7% were from foreign countries (down from 2.0% in 2007). The population of natives of Metropolitan France living in French Polynesia has declined in relative terms since the 1980s, but in absolute terms their population peaked at the 2007 census, when 24,265 lived in French Polynesia (not counting their children born there). With the local economic crisis, their population declined to 22,278 at the 2012 census, and 22,387 at the 2017 census.

Place of birth of residents of French Polynesia
Census	French Polynesia	Metropolitan France	Overseas France	Foreign countries with French citizenship at birth^{1}	Immigrants^{2}
2017	89.0%	8.1%	1.2%	0.9%	0.8%
2012	88.7%	8.3%	1.3%	0.9%	0.8%
2007	87.3%	9.3%	1.4%	1.1%	0.9%
2002	87.2%	9.5%	1.4%	1.2%	0.8%
1996	86.9%	9.3%	1.5%	1.3%	0.9%
1988	86.7%	9.2%	1.5%	1.5%	1.0%
1983	86.1%	10.1%	1.0%	1.5%	1.3%

Notes to table

^{1} Persons born abroad of French parents, such as Pieds-Noirs and children of French expatriates.

^{2} An immigrant is by French definition a person born in a foreign country and who had no French citizenship at birth. An immigrant may have acquired French citizenship since moving to France, but is still listed as an immigrant in French statistics. On the other hand, persons born in France with foreign citizenship (the children of immigrants) are not listed as immigrants. Source: ISPF

At the 1988 census, the last census which asked questions regarding ethnicity, 66.5% of people were ethnically unmixed Polynesians, 7.1% were ethnically Polynesians with light European or East Asian mixing, 11.9% were Europeans (mostly French), 9.3% were people of mixed European and Polynesian descent, the so-called Demis (literally meaning "Half"), and 4.7% were East Asians (mainly Chinese).

Chinese, Demis, and the white populace are essentially concentrated on the island of Tahiti, particularly in the urban area of Papeete, where their share of the population is thus much greater than in French Polynesia overall. Despite a long history of ethnic mixing, ethnic tensions have been growing in recent years, with politicians using a xenophobic discourse and fanning the flame of nationalism.

=== Historical population ===
Historical population

Year	Pop.	±% p.a.
1907	30,600	—
1911	31,900	+1.05%
1921	31,600	−0.09%
1926	35,900	+2.58%
1931	40,400	+2.39%
1936	44,000	+1.72%
1941	51,200	+3.08%
1946	58,200	+2.60%
1951	63,300	+1.48%
1956	76,323	+3.64%
1962	84,551	+1.75%

Year	Pop.	±% p.a.
1971	119,168	+4.25%
1977	137,382	+2.31%
1983	166,753	+3.04%
1988	188,814	+2.57%
1996	219,521	+1.90%
2002	245,516	+1.83%
2007	259,596	+1.17%
2012	268,270	+0.66%
2017	275,918	+0.57%
2022	278,786	+0.21%

Official figures from past censuses.

== Culture ==
=== Languages ===
Home languages in French Polynesia (2017 Census)
Languages	percent
French	73.9%
Tahitian	20.2%
Marquesan	2.6%
Mangareva	0.2%
Austral languages	1.2%
Tuamotuan	1%
Chinese	0.6%
Other	0.4%

All the indigenous languages of French Polynesia are Polynesian. French Polynesia has been linguistically diverse since ancient times, with each community having its own local speech variety. These dialects can be grouped into seven languages on the basis of mutual intelligibility: Tahitian, Tuamotuan, Rapa, Austral, North Marquesan, South Marquesan, and Mangarevan. Some of these, especially Tuamotuan, are really dialect continua formed by a patchwork of different dialects. The distinction between languages and dialects is notoriously difficult to establish, and so some authors may view two varieties as dialects of the same language, while others may view them as distinct languages. In this way, North and South Marquesan are often grouped together as a single Marquesan language, and Rapa is often viewed as part of Austral subfamily. At the same time, Ra'ivavae is often viewed as distinct from them.

French is the sole official language of French Polynesia. An organic law of 12 April 1996 states that "French is the official language, Tahitian and other Polynesian languages can be used". At the 2017 census, among the population whose age was 15 and older, 73.9% of people reported that the language they spoke the most at home was French (up from 68.6% at the 2007 census), 20.2% reported that the language they spoke the most at home was Tahitian (down from 24.3% at the 2007 census), 2.6% reported Marquesan and 0.2% the related Mangareva language (same percentages for both at the 2007 census), 1.2% reported any of the Austral languages (down from 1.3% at the 2007 census), 1.0% reported Tuamotuan (down from 1.5% at the 2007 census), 0.6% reported a Chinese dialect (41% of which was Hakka) (down from 1.0% at the 2007 census), and 0.4% another language (more than half of which was English) (down from 0.5% at the 2007 census).

At the same census, 95.2% of people whose age was 15 or older reported that they could speak, read and write French (up from 94.7% at the 2007 census), whereas only 1.3% reported that they had no knowledge of French (down from 2.0% at the 2007 census). 86.5% of people whose age was 15 or older reported that they had some form of knowledge of at least one Polynesian language (up from 86.4% at the 2007 census but down from 87.8% at the 2012 census), whereas 13.5% reported that they had no knowledge of any of the Polynesian languages (down from 13.6% at the 2007 census but up from 12.2% at the 2012 census).

=== Music ===
French Polynesia appeared in the world music scene in 1992, recorded by French musicologist Pascal Nabet-Meyer with the release of The Tahitian Choir's recordings of unaccompanied vocal Christian music called himene tārava. This form of singing is common in French Polynesia and the Cook Islands, and is notable for a unique drop in pitch at the end of the phrases, a characteristic formed by several different voices, accompanied by a steady grunting of staccato, nonlexical syllables.

=== Dance ===
Tahitian dance as a movement art evolved alongside Tahitian oral transmission of cultural knowledge. In fact, dance movement or gesture has significance that supported the transmission of cultural knowledge. Dance styles include 'Aparima and 'upa'upa.

However, after the London Missionary Society brought their religion to the islands, they pressured King Pōmare II (whom they had converted from traditional beliefs to their Reformed tradition) to introduce a new legal code. This code, now known as the Pōmare Code, came into effect in 1819 and banned numerous traditional practices including dancing, chants, floral costumes, tattooing and more.

=== Religion ===
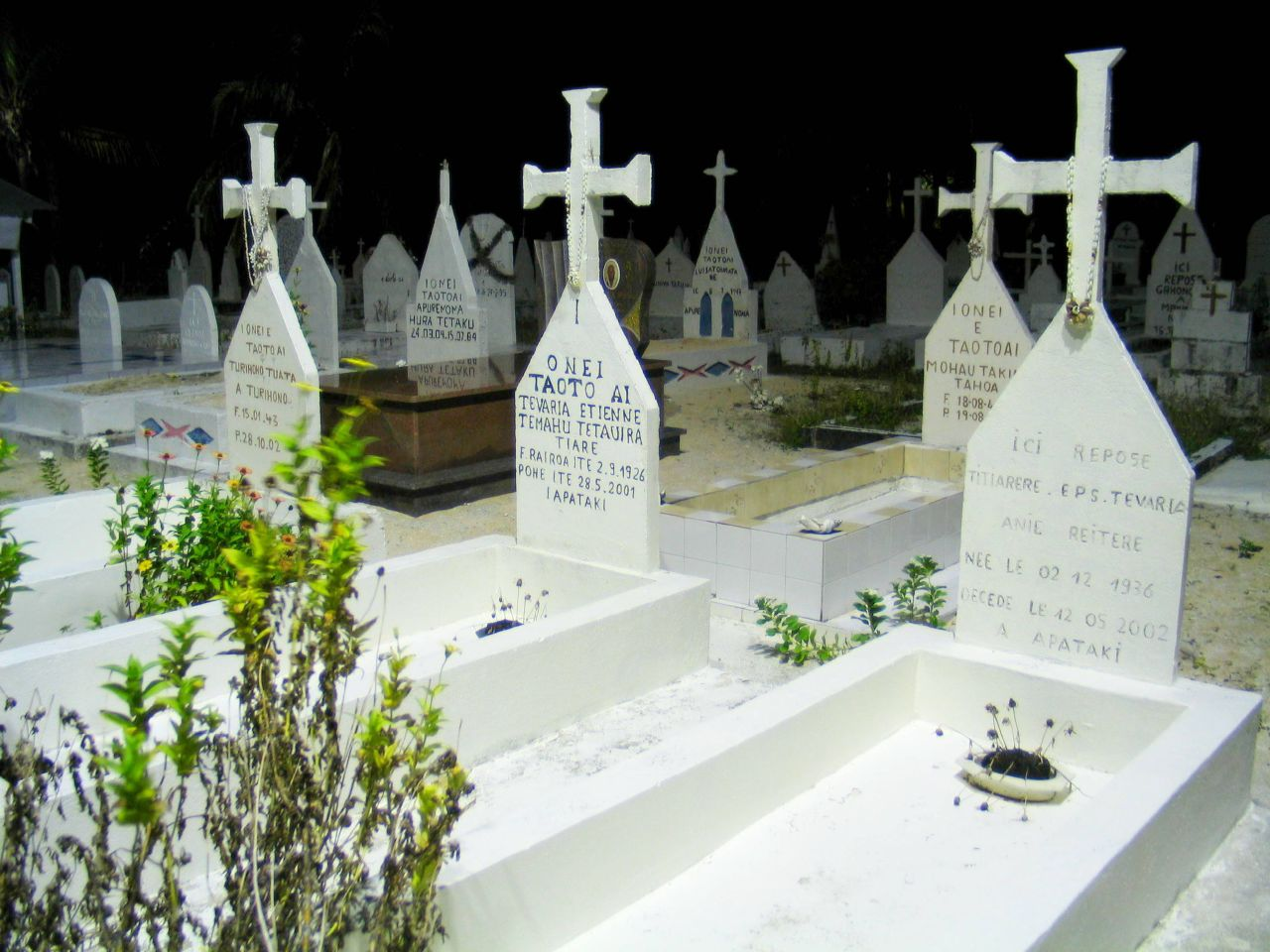
Cemetery in the Tuāmotu

Christianity is the main religion of the islands. A majority of 54% belongs to various Protestant churches, especially the Maohi Protestant Church, which is the largest and accounts for more than 50% of the population. It traces its origins to Pōmare II, the king of Tahiti, who converted from traditional beliefs to the Reformed tradition brought to the islands by the London Missionary Society.

Catholics constitute a large minority of 38.3% of the population (2019) which has its own ecclesiastical province, comprising the Metropolitan Archdiocese of Papeete and its only suffragan, the Diocese of Taiohae. The number and proportion of Catholics has increased significantly since 1950, when they represented 21.6% of the total population.

Data from 1991 revealed that Catholics were in the majority in the Tuamotu Islands, Gambier Islands and the Marquesas Islands, while Protestants formed the majority in the Austral Islands and several of the Society Islands such as Tahiti. This diversity is due to the fact that Protestant missionaries (from England and the United States) first came to one group of islands, and after French colonisation the Catholic Church spread to several more scattered islands, but also to the main island of Tahiti.

The Church of Jesus Christ of Latter-day Saints had 30,350 members as of 2025. Community of Christ, another denomination within the Latter-Day Saint tradition, claimed 9,256 total French Polynesian members as of 2018 including Mareva Arnaud Tchong who serves in the church's governing Council of Twelve Apostles. There were about 3,000 Jehovah's Witnesses in Tahiti as of 2014, and an estimated 500 Muslims in French Polynesia.

=== Cuisine ===
French Polynesia produces a significant array of fruits and vegetables as natural local produce (especially coconut), which feature in many of the dishes of the islands, as does fresh seafood. Foods like faraoa 'ipo, poisson cru and rēti'a are commonly eaten. The islands of Tahiti and the Marquesas indulge in a unique food made by preserving breadfruit, known as ma, which either can be baked further in the earth oven, or consumed directly mixed with fresh breadfruit as popoi mei (as is in the Marquesas).

=== Sports ===
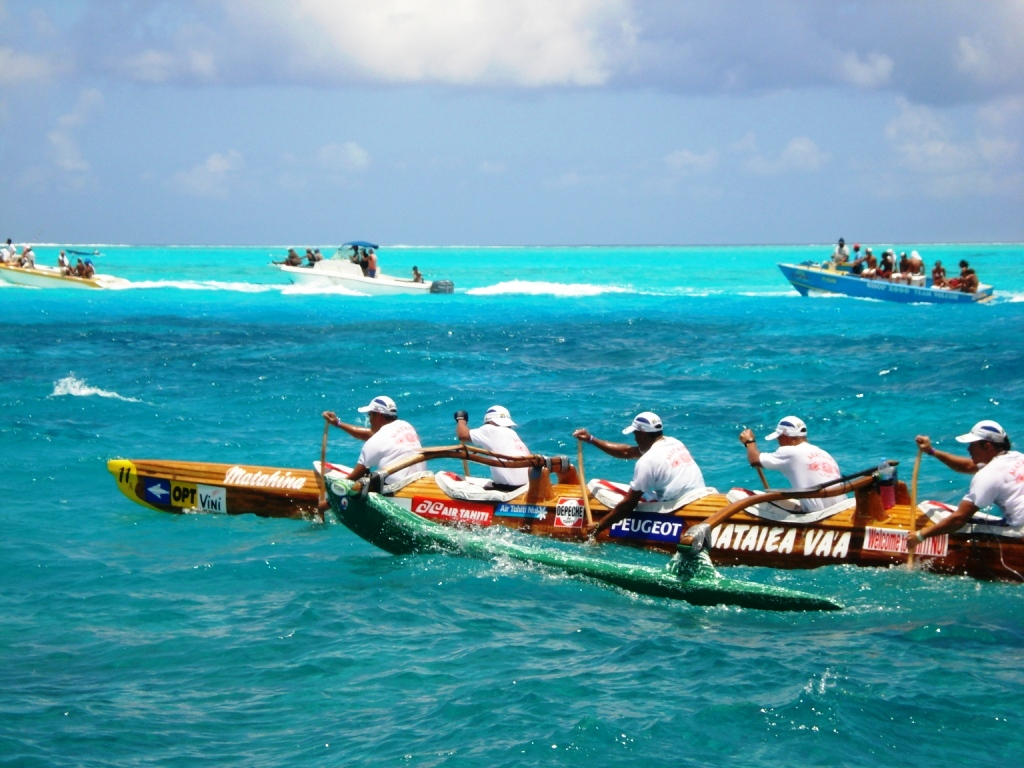
Va'a (traditional Polynesian outrigger canoe) during the Hawaiki Nui Va'a race

==== Football ====
The sport of football in the island of Tahiti is run by the Fédération Tahitienne de Football.

==== Va'a ====
The Polynesian traditional sport va'a is practiced in all the islands. French Polynesia hosts the Hawaiki nui va'a an international race between Tahiti, Huahine and Bora Bora.

==== Surfing ====
French Polynesia is famous for its reef break waves. Teahupo'o is probably the most renowned, regularly ranked in the best waves of the world. This site hosts the annual Billabong Pro Tahiti surf competition, the 7th stop of the World Championship Tour, and hosted the surfing events of the 2024 Summer Olympics.

==== Kitesurfing ====
There are many spots to practice kitesurfing in French Polynesia, with Tahiti, Moorea, Bora-Bora, Maupiti and Raivavae being among the most iconic.

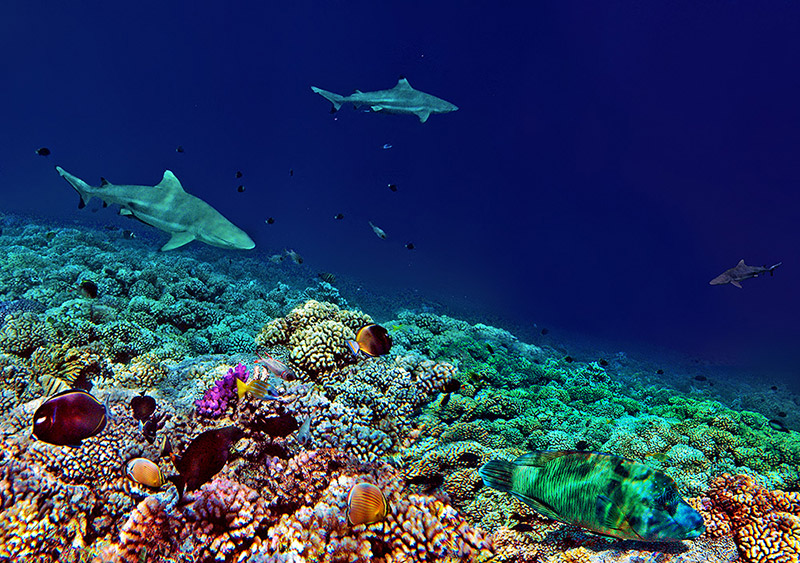
Fakarava atoll, south pass

==== Diving ====
French Polynesia is internationally known for diving. Each archipelago offers opportunities for divers. Rangiroa and Fakarava in the Tuamotu islands are the most famous spots in the area.

==== Rugby ====
Rugby is also popular in French Polynesia, specifically rugby union.

=== Television ===
Television channels with local programming include Polynésie la 1ère (established in 1965) and Tahiti Nui Television (established in 2000). Channels from metropolitan France are also available.

== Economy and infrastructure ==
Region	Total GDP, nominal, 2019 (billion US$)	GDP per capita, nominal, 2019 (US$)
Australia	1,388.09	54,391
New Zealand	210.76	42,274
Hawaii	93.24	63,997
Papua New Guinea	24.75	2,315
New Caledonia	9.48	34,939
Guam	6.36	37,794
French Polynesia	6.02	21,673
Fiji	5.44	6,079
Solomon Islands	1.62	2,278
Northern Mariana Islands	1.18	24,670
Vanuatu	0.93	3,187
Samoa	0.91	4,472
American Samoa	0.65	13,352
Tonga	0.45	4,435
Federated States of Micronesia	0.39	4,001
Cook Islands	0.39	22,752
Palau	0.28	15,992
Marshall Islands	0.23	5,275
Kiribati	0.22	1,847
Wallis and Futuna	0.21	18,360
Nauru	0.13	10,567
Tuvalu	0.05	5,277

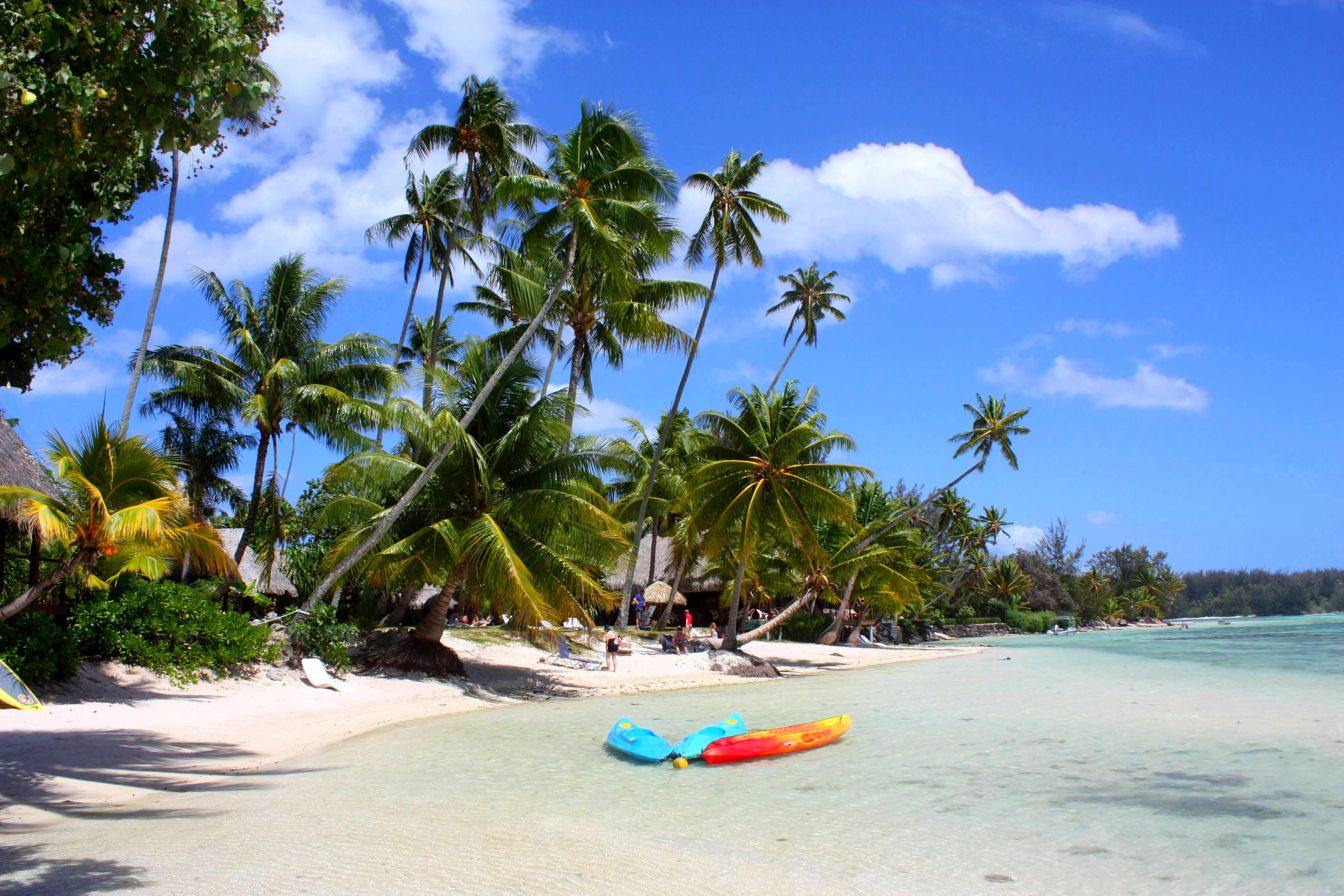
Tourism is an important source of income for French Polynesia.

The legal tender of French Polynesia is the CFP franc which has a fixed exchange rate with the euro. The nominal gross domestic product (GDP) of French Polynesia in 2019 was 6.02 billion U.S. dollars at market exchange rates, the seventh-largest economy in Oceania after Australia, New Zealand, Hawaii, Papua New Guinea, New Caledonia, and Guam. The GDP per capita was US$21,673 in 2019 (at market exchange rates, not at PPP), lower than in Hawaii, Australia, New Zealand, Guam, New Caledonia, the Northern Mariana Islands, and the Cook Islands, but higher than in all other independent insular states and dependent territories of Oceania.

French Polynesia was severely affected by the 2008 financial crisis and subsequent Great Recession, and experienced as a result 4 years of recession from 2009 to 2012. French Polynesia renewed with economic growth in 2013, and experienced strong economic growth in the 2nd half of the 2010s, with an average real GDP growth rate of +2.8% per year from 2016 to 2019, before being affected by the COVID-19 pandemic in 2020, which has led to another recession.

French Polynesia has a moderately developed economy, which is dependent on imported goods, tourism, and the financial assistance of mainland France. Tourist facilities are well developed and are available on the major islands. Main agricultural productions are coconuts (copra), vegetables and fruits. French Polynesia exports noni juice, a high quality vanilla, and the famous black Tahitian pearls which accounted for 55% of exports (in value) in 2008.

French Polynesia's seafloor contains rich deposits of nickel, cobalt, manganese, and copper that are not exploited.

In 2008, French Polynesia's imports amounted to 2.2 billion U.S. dollars and exports amounted to 0.2 billion U.S. dollars.

GDP (nominal) per capita in 2019 (US$)
$0 – $5,000 $5,000 – $10,000 $10,000 – $20,000 $20,000 – $30,000 $30,000 – $45,000 $45,000 – $60,000 $60,000 – $90,000

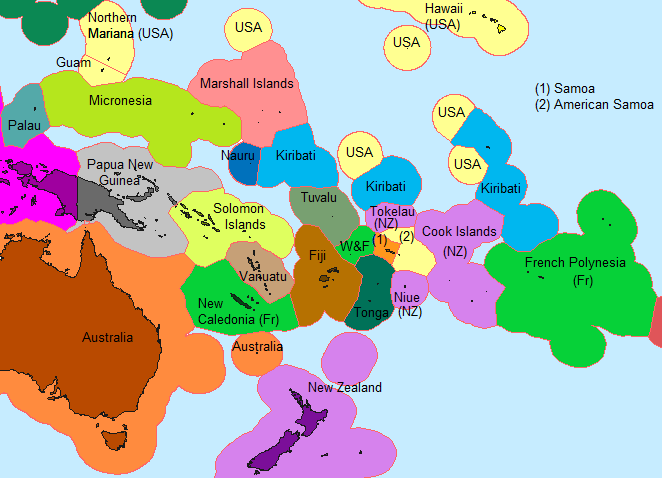

=== Transportation ===
There are 53 airports in French Polynesia; 46 are paved. Fa'a'ā International Airport is the only international airport in French Polynesia. Each island has its own airport that serves flights to other islands. Air Tahiti is the main airline that flies around the islands.

=== Communication ===
In 2017, Alcatel Submarine Networks, a unit of Nokia, launched a project to connect many of the islands in French Polynesia with underwater fiber optic cable. The project, called NATITUA, is intended to improve French Polynesian broadband connectivity by linking Tahiti to 10 islands in the Tuamotu and Marquesas archipelagos. In August 2018, a celebration was held to commemorate the arrival of a submarine cable from Papeete to the atoll of Hao, extending the network by about 1000 kilometres.

== Notable people ==
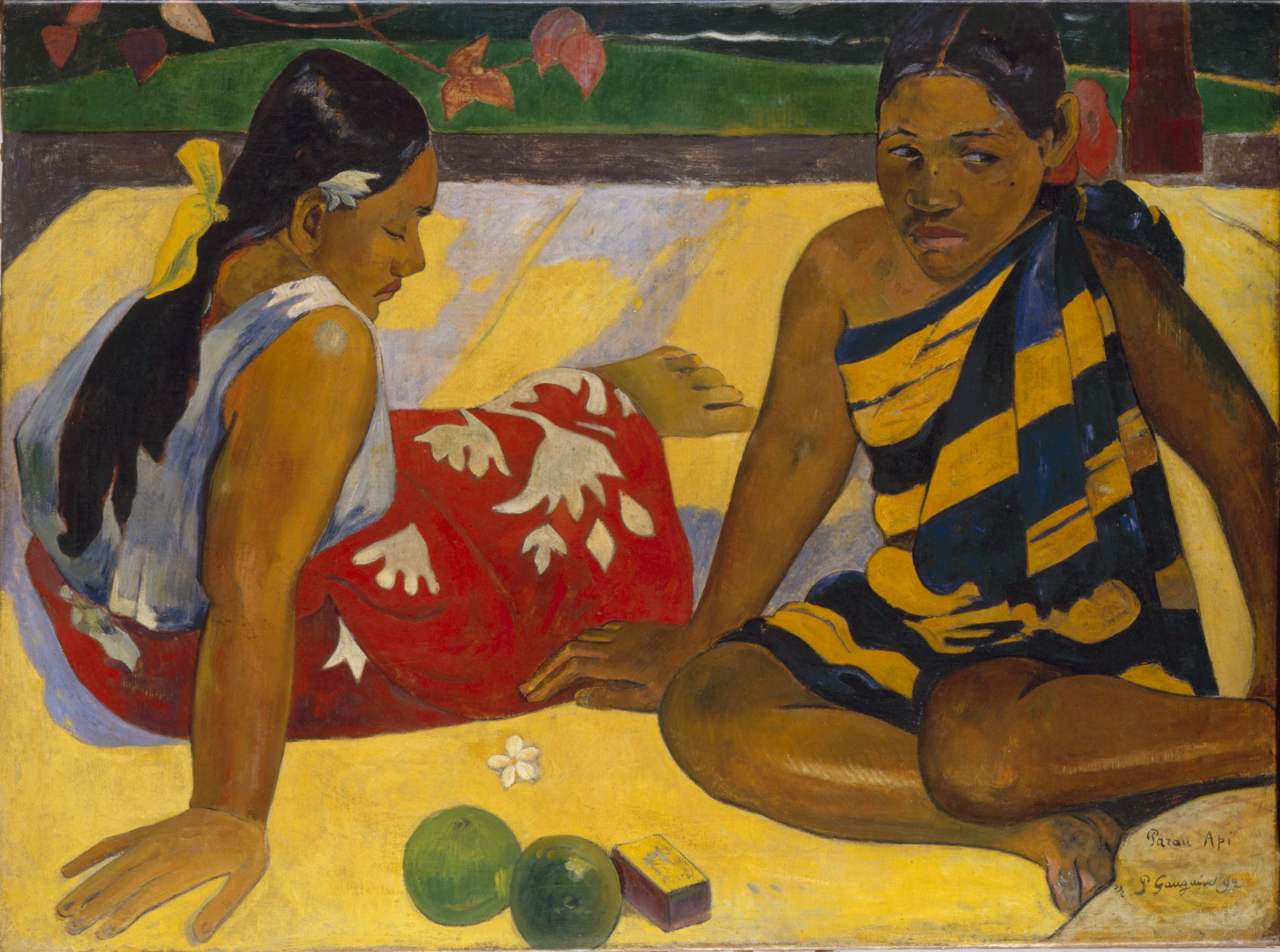
Painting of Two Women of Tahiti by Paul Gauguin

- Taïna Barioz (born 1988), World Champion skier representing France
- Billy Besson, Olympic sailor representing France
- Michel Bourez (born 1985), professional surfer
- Cheyenne Brando (1970–1995), model, daughter of Marlon Brando and Tarita Teriipaia
- Jacques Brel (1929–1978), Belgian musician who lived in French Polynesia near the end of his life
- Vaimalama Chaves (born 1994), Miss France 2019
- Jean Gabilou (born 1944), singer; represented France in the 1981 Eurovision Song Contest
- Chantal Galenon (born 1956), politician and women's rights activist
- Paul Gauguin (1848–1903), French Post-Impressionist painter who spent the last years of his life in French Polynesia
- Conrad Hall (1926–2003), American cinematographer
- Vaitiare Hirson-Asars (born 1964), actress
- Ella Koon (born 1979), singer, actress and model
- Karina Lombard (born 1969), French-American model and actress
- Pouvāna'a 'Ō'opa (1895–1977), politician and Tahitian nationalist
- Fabrice Santoro (born 1972), professional tennis player
- Tarita Teriipaia (born 1941), actress, third wife of Marlon Brando
- Marama Vahirua (born 1980), footballer, cousin of Pascal Vahirua
- Pascal Vahirua (born 1966), French former international footballer
- Célestine Hitiura Vaite (born 1966), writer

== See also ==
- Outline of French Polynesia
- Index of French Polynesia-related articles
- List of colonial and departmental heads of French Polynesia
- French colonial empire
- List of French possessions and colonies
- Lists of islands

== Bibliography ==
- Aldrich, Robert (1990). The French Presence in the South Pacific, 1842–1940. Basingstoke, Hampshire: Macmillan Publishers. ISBN 978-0-333-42811-5.
- Aldrich, Robert (1993). France and the South Pacific since 1940. Honolulu: University of Hawaii Press. ISBN 978-0-8248-1558-5.
- Charpentier, Jean-Michel [in French]; François, Alexandre (2015). Atlas Linguistique de Polynésie Française — Linguistic Atlas of French Polynesia (in French and English). De Gruyter & Université de la Polynésie Française. ISBN 978-3-11-026035-9.
- Danielsson, Bengt (1956). Work and life on Raroia, an acculturation study from the Tuamotu group, French Oceania. London: G. Allen & Unwin. OCLC 168202.
- Danielsson, Bengt; Danielsson, Marie-Thérèse (1986). Poisoned reign: French nuclear colonialism in the Pacific (2nd ed.). Ringwood, Vic., Australia; New York, N.Y., U.S.A: Penguin Books. ISBN 978-0-14-008130-5.
- Hough, Richard (1995). Captain James Cook. New York: W.W. Norton & Co. ISBN 978-0-393-03680-0.
- Pollock, Nancy J.; Crocombe, R. G., eds. (1988). French Polynesia: a book of selected readings (in English and French). Suva, Fiji: Institute of Pacific Studies of the University of the South Pacific. ISBN 978-982-02-0032-6.
- Rogers, James; Simón, Luis (February 2009). The Status and Location of the Military Installations of the Member States of the European Union and Their Potential Role for the European Security and Defence Policy (ESDP) (PDF) (Report). Brussels: European Parliament.
- Regnault, Jean-Marc (2005). Le pouvoir confisqué en Polynésie française: l'affrontement Temaru – Flosse (in French). Paris: Les Indes Savantes. ISBN 978-2-84654-097-1.
- Thompson, Virginia; Adloff, Richard (1971). The French Pacific Islands: French Polynesia and New Caledonia. Berkeley: University of California Press. ISBN 978-0-520-01843-3.
