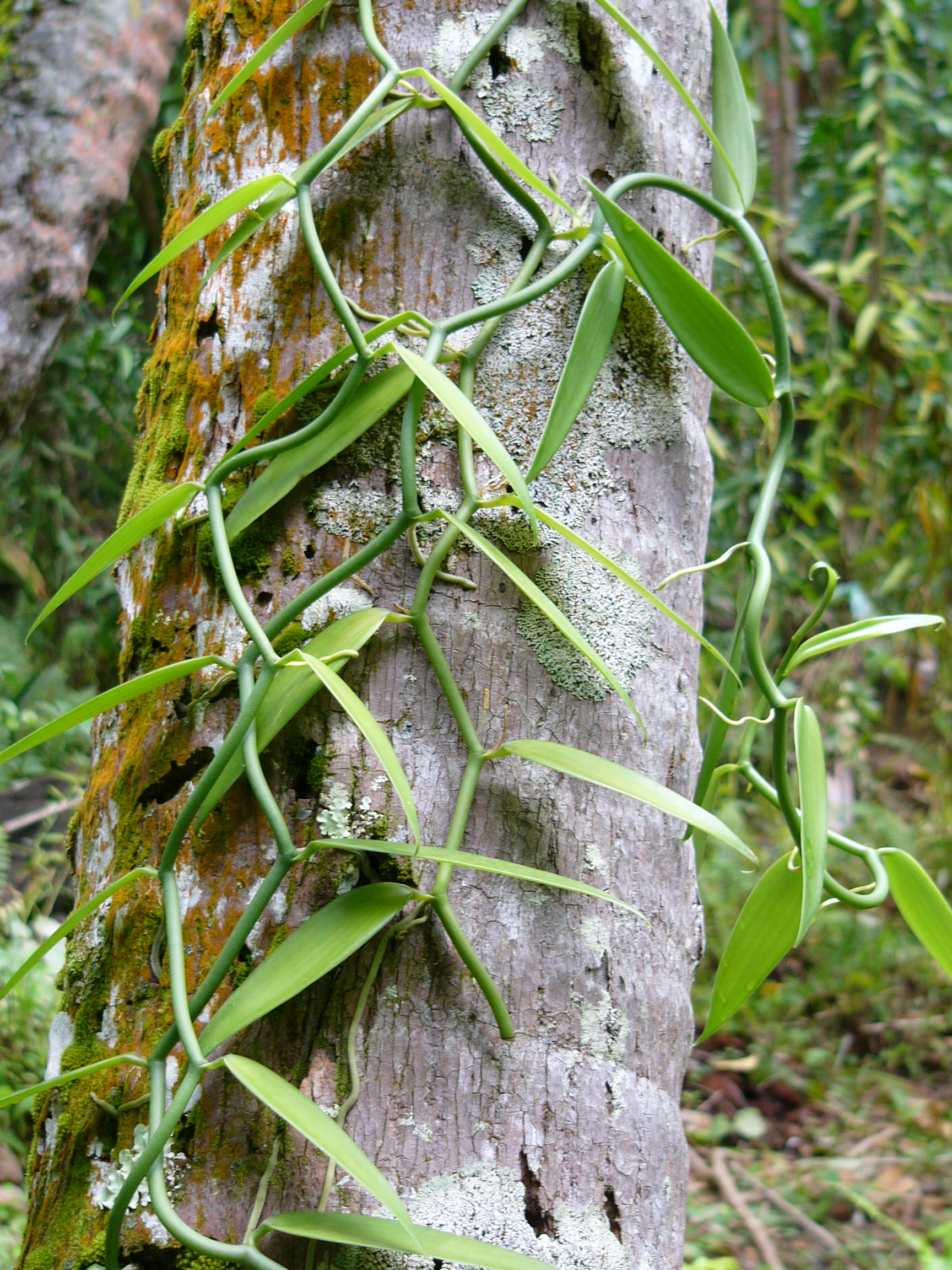

Scientific classification
- Kingdom: Plantae
- Clade: Tracheophytes
- Clade: Angiosperms
- Clade: Monocots
- Order: Asparagales
- Family: Orchidaceae
- Subfamily: Vanilloideae
- Genus: Vanilla
- Species: V. × tahitensis

Binomial name
- Vanilla × tahitensis J.W.Moore

Synonyms
- Vanilla × hirsuta M.A.Clem. & D.L.Jones; Vanilla × tiarei Costantin & Bois

= Vanilla × tahitensis =

Species of orchid

Vanilla × tahitensis is a hybrid orchid in the genus Vanilla. It was first described by the botanist John William Moore in 1933 from Raiatea in the Society Islands, where it was found growing on trees, having escaped from cultivation.

== History ==
Vanilla × tahitensis is a polyploid that is a cross between Vanilla planifolia and Vanilla odorata. This hybridisation may have happened naturally or inadvertently in the period 1350–1500 in tropical America, though it is listed as an artificial hybrid in Plants of the World Online (POWO). It was used by the Aztecs and the flavour proved popular with the Spaniards. Hernán Cortés brought vanilla pods to Europe where they were grown in greenhouses, and cultivation was attempted in various tropical locations. Seeds from Madagascar were taken to Tahiti in 1848 by the French Admiral Ferdinand-Alphonse Hamelin, and it was this foundation stock that is now cultivated as Vanilla tahitensis in French Polynesia. In Mexico, it is pollinated by a specific species of bee, so when grown elsewhere, the flowers need to be pollinated by hand in order for the pods to develop.

== Description ==
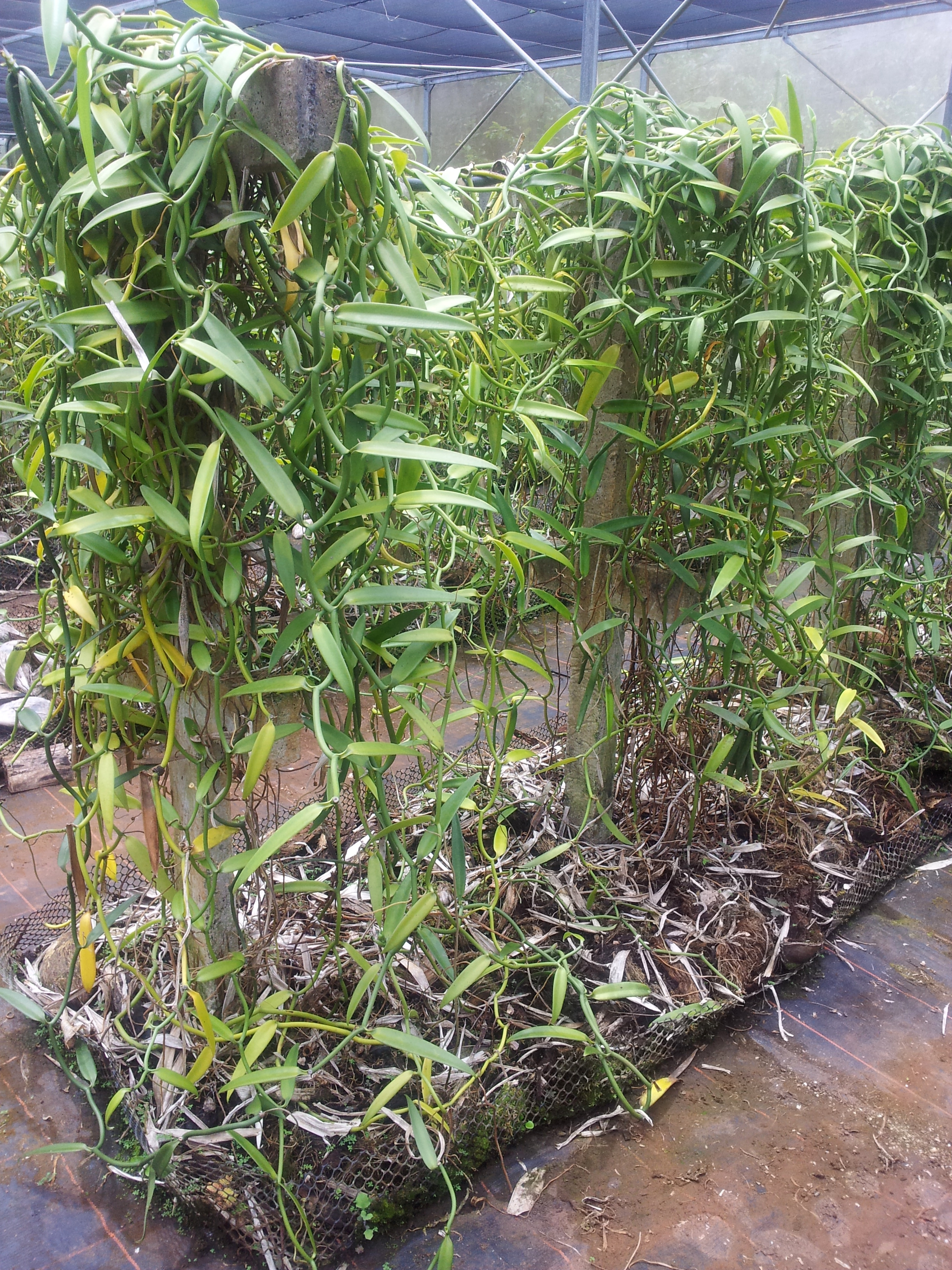
Vanilla × tahitensis in cultivation

Vanilla × tahitensis is a vine that grows on trees for support. It has zig-zag stems, narrow elliptic leaves and yellowish-green flowers, which are followed by bunches of bean-like pods. As compared to the more widely grown Vanilla planifolia, the pods are shorter and broader, and its taste and fragrance are also distinctive.

== Cultivation ==
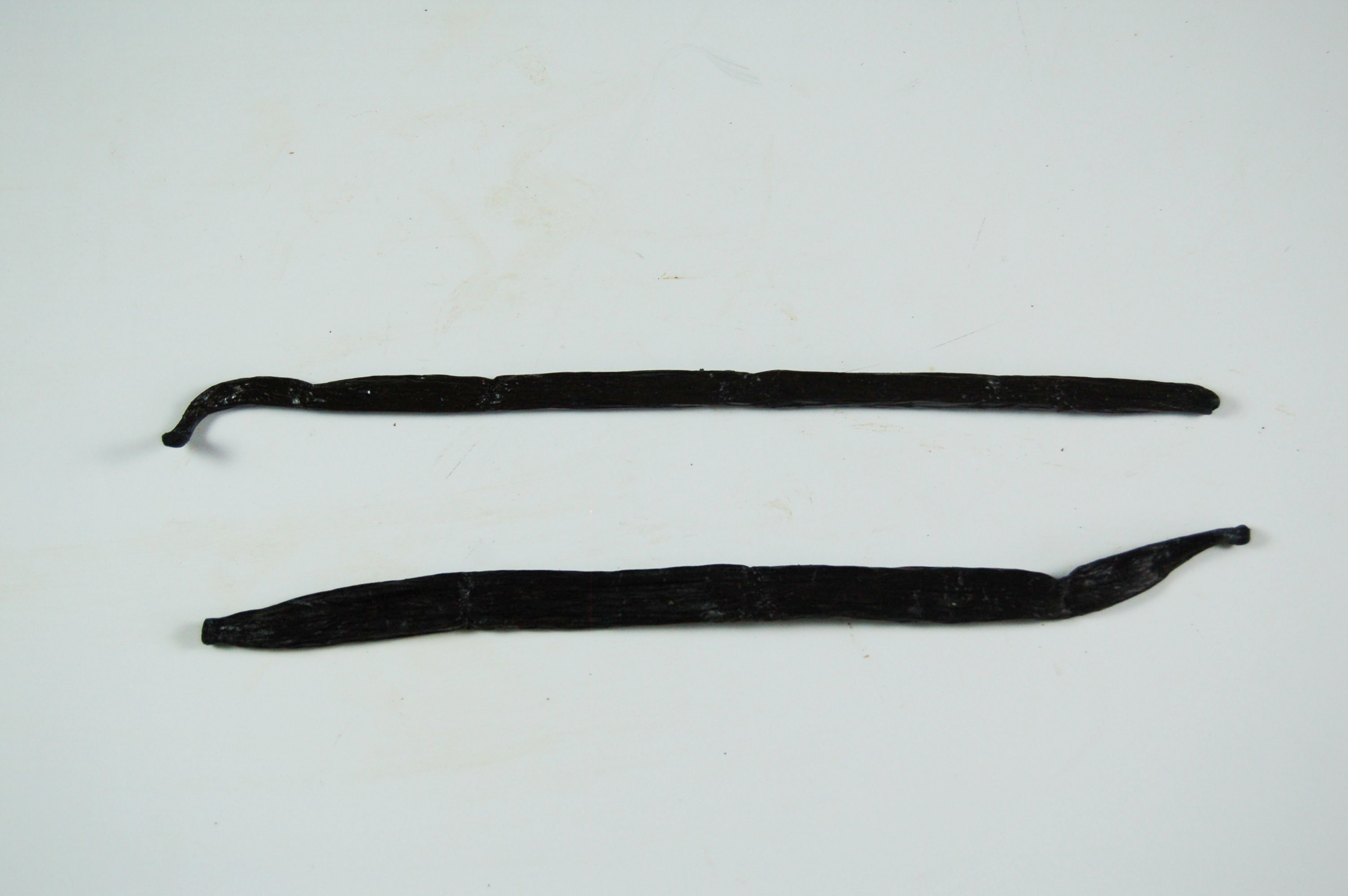
Vanilla × tahitensis bean (down)

The seed is planted at the foot of a small tree and the vine scrambles up the trunk. When it gets too tall to be easily reached, it is detached from the trunk and wound round it, the trunk becoming surrounded by multiple layers of vine. The plant starts flowering when three years old, and as the flowers only last for a day, they need to be hand-pollinated in a timely manner. The pods develop over a period of about nine months, and they are picked by hand when they turn reddish-brown. They are then sun-dried by day and placed in sweatboxes by night. The curing and fermentation process lasts for about three months, during which time the pods lose much of their moisture and become supple and oily.

== Chemistry ==
The pods are relatively flavourless when first picked and the typical flavours and aromas arise during the curing process. The main active ingredients are vanillin, 4-hydroxybenzoic acid, 4-hydroxybenzaldehyde and vanillic acid.

== See also ==
- Vanilla production in French Polynesia
