= Ia Ora 'O Tahiti Nui =

Anthem of French Polynesia

Ia Ora 'O Tahiti Nui (Tahitian) Pour que vive Tahiti Nui (French)
English: Long live Tahiti Nui
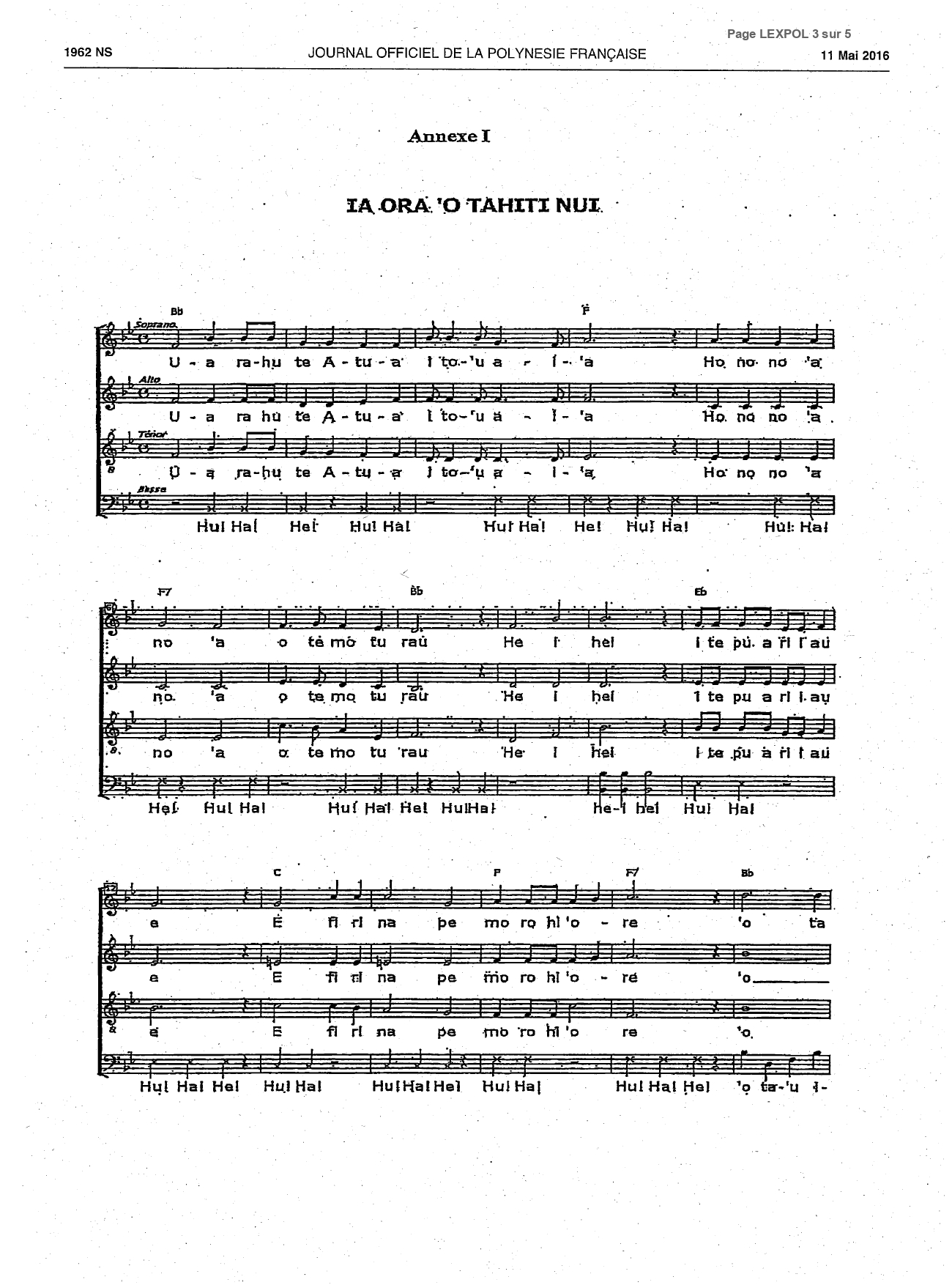
- First page of the anthem as it was published by the Government of French Polynesia
- Territorial anthem of French Polynesia
- Lyrics: Maeva Bougues, Irmine Tehei, Angèle Terorotua, Johanna Nouveau, Patrick Amaru, Louis Mamatui, Jean-Pierre et Pierre Célestin
- Music: Jean Paul Berlier
- Adopted: 10 June 1993

"Ia Ora 'O Tahiti Nui" (lit. 'Long Live Tahiti Nui') is the territorial anthem of the overseas country of French Polynesia. It is sung during public or sport events alongside the French national anthem, "La Marseillaise". The lyrics are in Tahitian. It was adopted on 10 June 1993 by the Assembly of French Polynesia with the Loi du Pays 1993-60.

== Lyrics ==
Tahitian original

𝄆 ʻUa rahu te Atua (i) tōʻu ʻāiʻa
Hono noʻanoʻa o te motu rau
Heihei i te pua riʻi au ē
E firi nape mōrohi ʻore
ʻO tāʻu īa e faʻateniteni nei 𝄇

𝄆 Tē tūoro nei te reo here
O te huia
ʻA hiʻi tō aroha
ʻIa ora ʻo Tahiti Nui ē 𝄇

IPA transcription (Note: See Help:IPA and Tahitian language § Phonology.)

𝄆 [ʔu.a ra.hu te a.tu.a i toː.ʔu ʔaː.i.ʔa]
[ho.no no.ʔa.no.ʔa o te mo.tu rau̯]
[he.i.hei̯ i te pu.a ri.ʔi au̯ eː]
[e fi.ri na.pe moː.ro.hi ʔo.re]
[ʔo taː.ʔu iː.a e fa.ʔa.te.ni.te.ni nei̯] 𝄇

𝄆 [teː tuː.o.ro nei̯ te re.o he.re]
[o te hu.i.a]
[ʔa hi.ʔi toː a.ro.ha]
[ʔi̯a o.ra ʔo ta.hi.ti nu.i eː] 𝄇

French translation

𝄆 Mon pays est né de Dieu
Collier d’îles multiples
Aux délicates senteurs
Reliées d’une tresse immortelle
Aujourd’hui je te loue 𝄇

𝄆 Voici que s’élève la voix
De tes enfants
Répands ton amour
Pour que vive Tahiti Nui 𝄇

English translation

𝄆 My country is born of God
Multiple islands’ necklace
With delicate fragrances
Tied with an immortal braid
Today I honor you 𝄇

𝄆 Here is the rising voice
From your children
Spread your love
For Tahiti Nui to live 𝄇

== Gallery ==
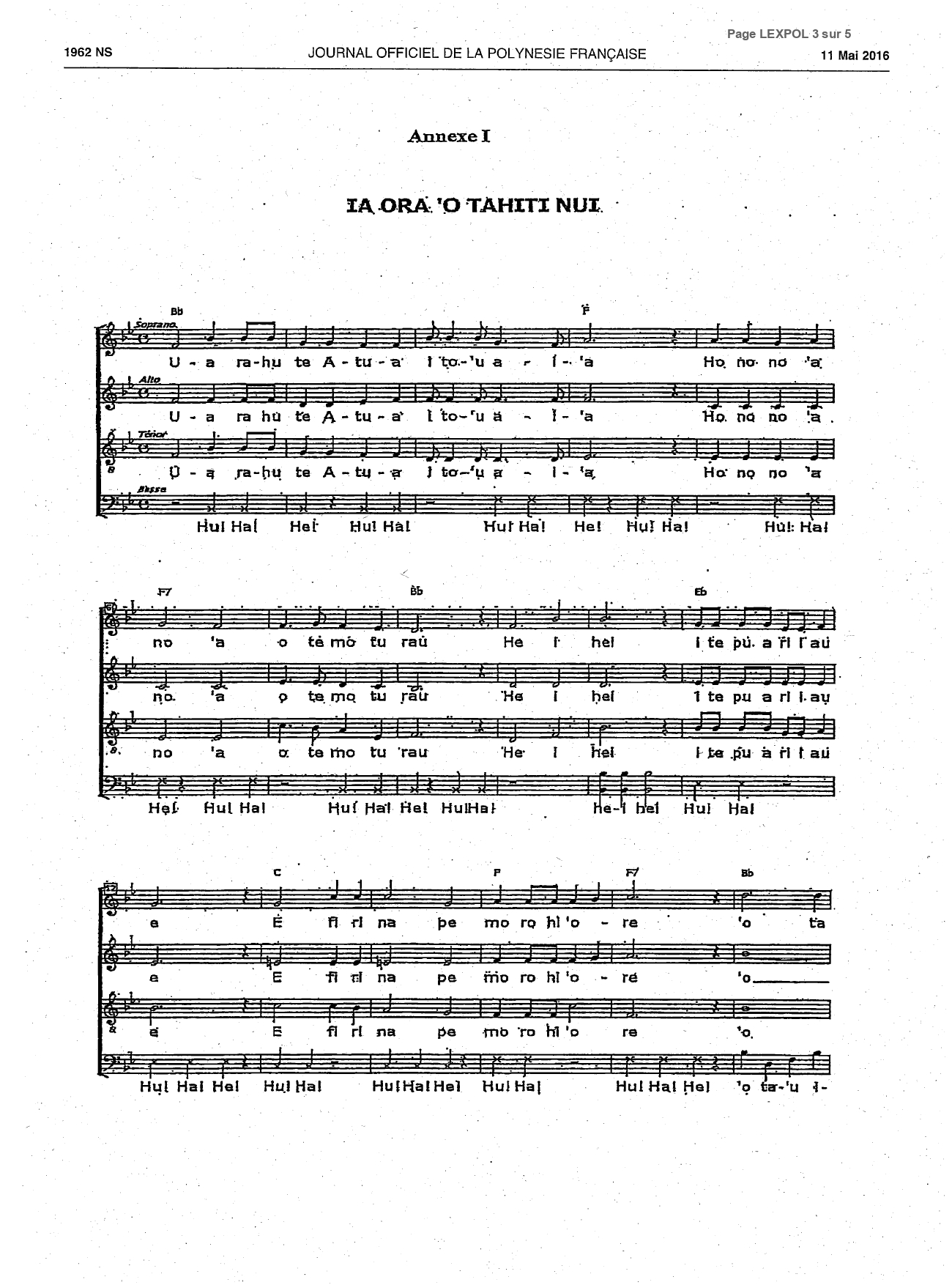
First music sheet

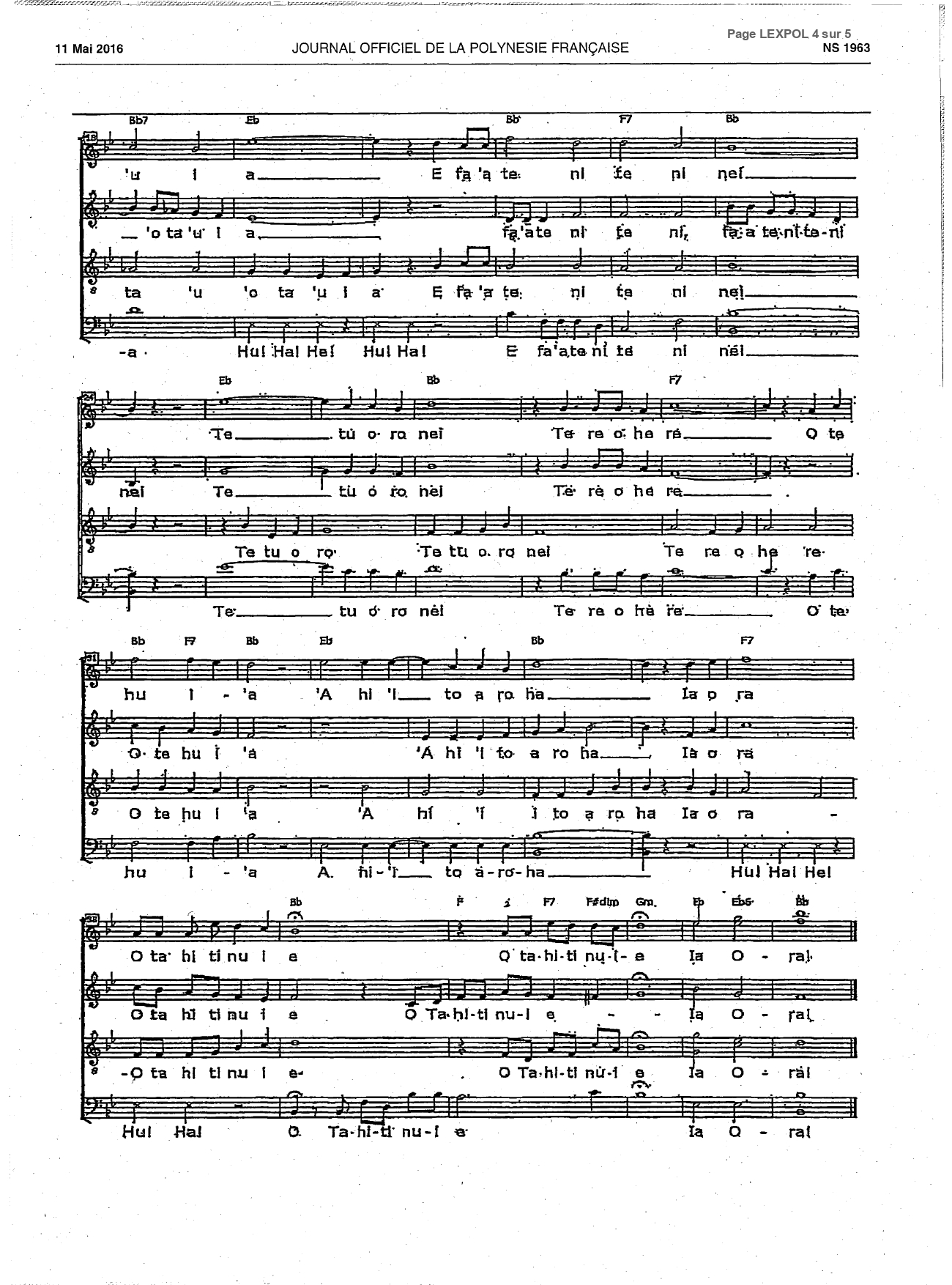
Second music sheet
