= Vanilla production in French Polynesia =

Crop production in French Polynesia

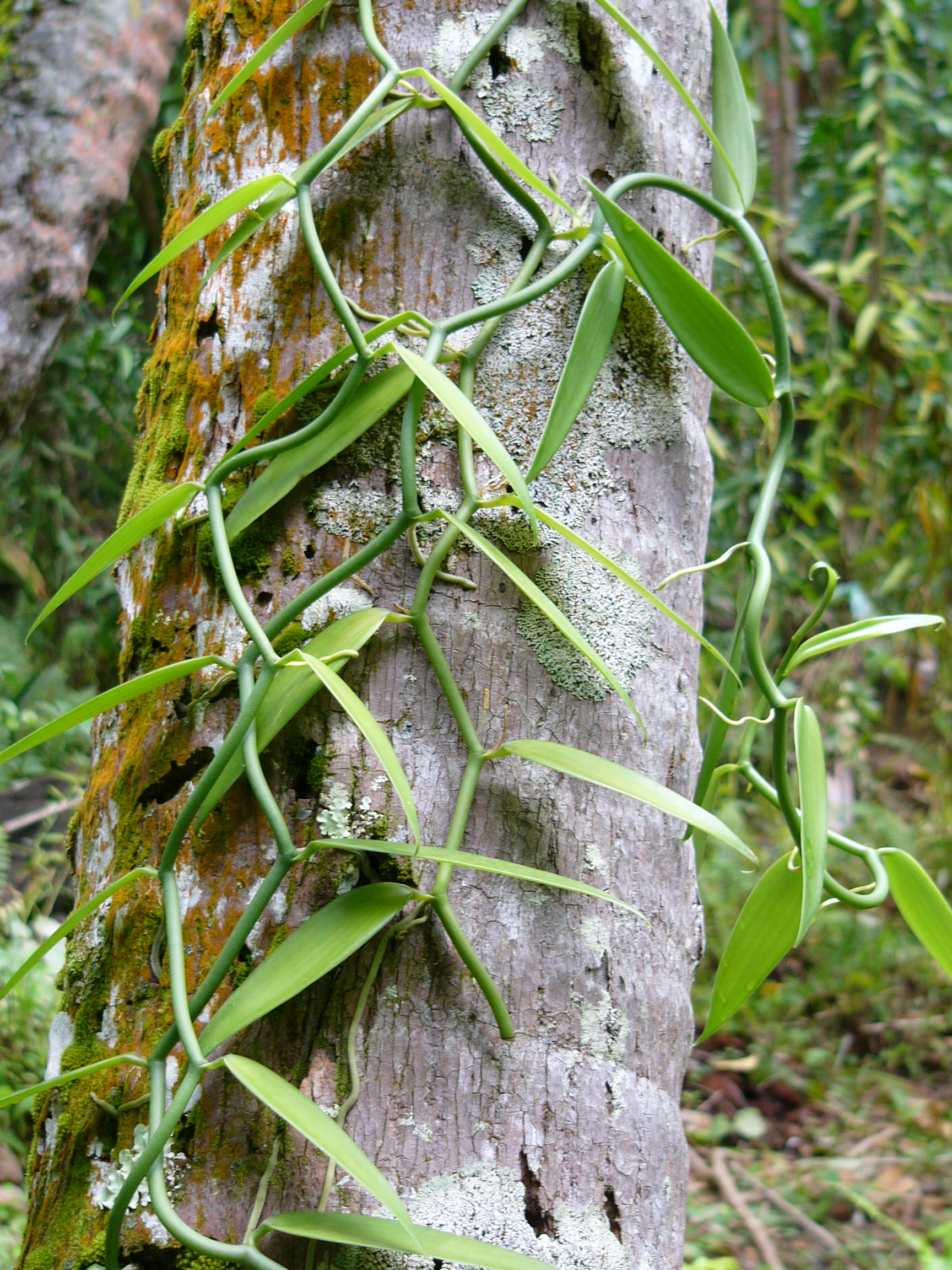
Vanilla × tahitensis vines in Huahine, French Polynesia

Vanilla production contributes to the local economy of French Polynesia. Although it was a major export crop after its introduction by the French in 1848, vanilla is no longer a significant export product.

Vanilla was first introduced to French Polynesia by French colonizers as an export crop. Later, it became an important cash crop in the development of the island's economy. In the early 20th century, production was much greater than it is today, with 150-200 tons produced annually and plantations employing a sizable percentage of the population. Over the years, its production has been influenced by several factors and has declined from a high of 200 tons to a 2013 yield of 60 tons. The largest concentration of the vanilla variety Vanilla × tahitensis (Tahitian vanilla) is situated in the Society Islands. The island of Taha'a, known as the "Vanilla Island" because of its pervasive aroma of vanilla, produces about 80% of all French Polynesia's vanilla.

== Background ==
Vanilla × tahitensis (Tahitian vanilla), which is a cross-strain of Vanilla planifola (Mexican vanilla and Bourbon vanilla) and Vanilla odorata, is produced in French Polynesia, especially in Tahiti, and also Hawaii. Its pods have fewer seeds than Vanilla planifolia, which is not a direct competitor. Mexican vanilla is used almost exclusively as the base of vanilla extract, due to higher vanillin levels. Tahitian vanilla is used primarily in perfume because of its coumarin-like scent. Other Tahitian vanilla products include vanilla green tea, vanilla oil, vanilla powder, vanilla rum, and vinegar-based vanilla.

== History ==
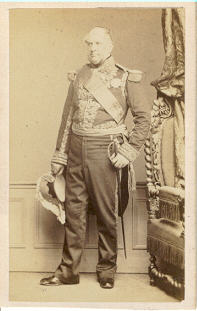
Admiral Hamelin

Vanilla, originally a crop endemic to South America, was introduced in French Polynesia in 1848 by Admiral Ferdinand-Alphonse Hamelin, a French commander in the Pacific. The admiral delivered several dozen specimens of the plant to the Tahitian Governor's garden in Papeete. A new variety of vanilla was subsequently developed in the area and came to be popularly known as Tahitian vanilla. This has special characteristics compared to the varieties such as Vanilla planifolia grown in other parts of the world, particularly in respect to taste and scent. It has resulted in a separate vanilla classification and market for the Tahitian variety.

The introduction occurred only one year after France made French Polynesia its protectorate, and over the next 40 years it became a major export to the United States, France, and Britain. Initially the vanilla plantations were owned by French mainland transplants; later, the local Tahitians learned the processes and became major producers of the crop, with native families involved in its growth from "seed to pod." However, in the 20th century, the Chinese, who came initially as labor for the plantations, became the primary actors in processing the crop for, marketing to, and making the crop available to the international market, though still some farms are owned by people of French and native origins.

== Production ==
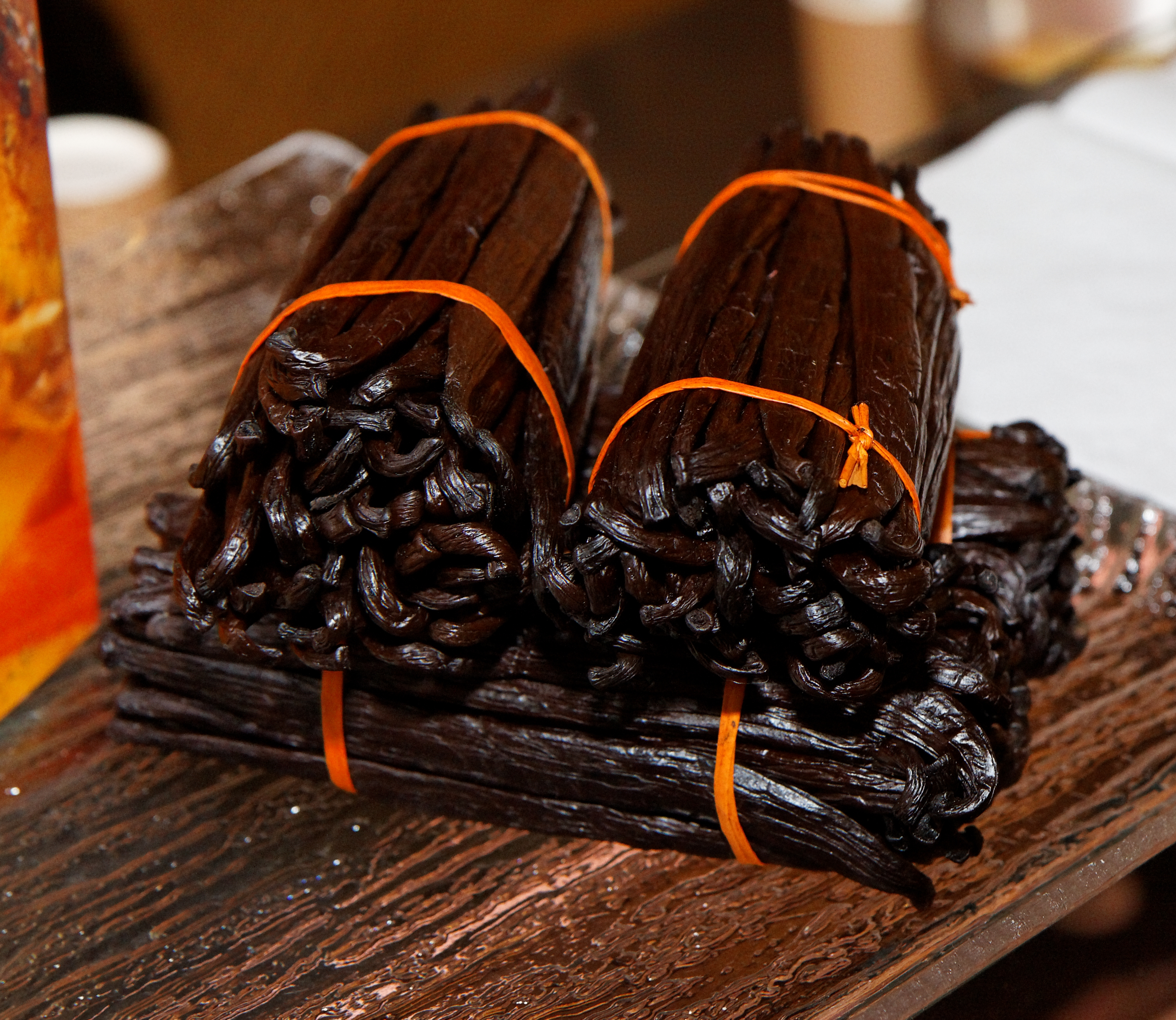
Export product of Tahitian vanilla

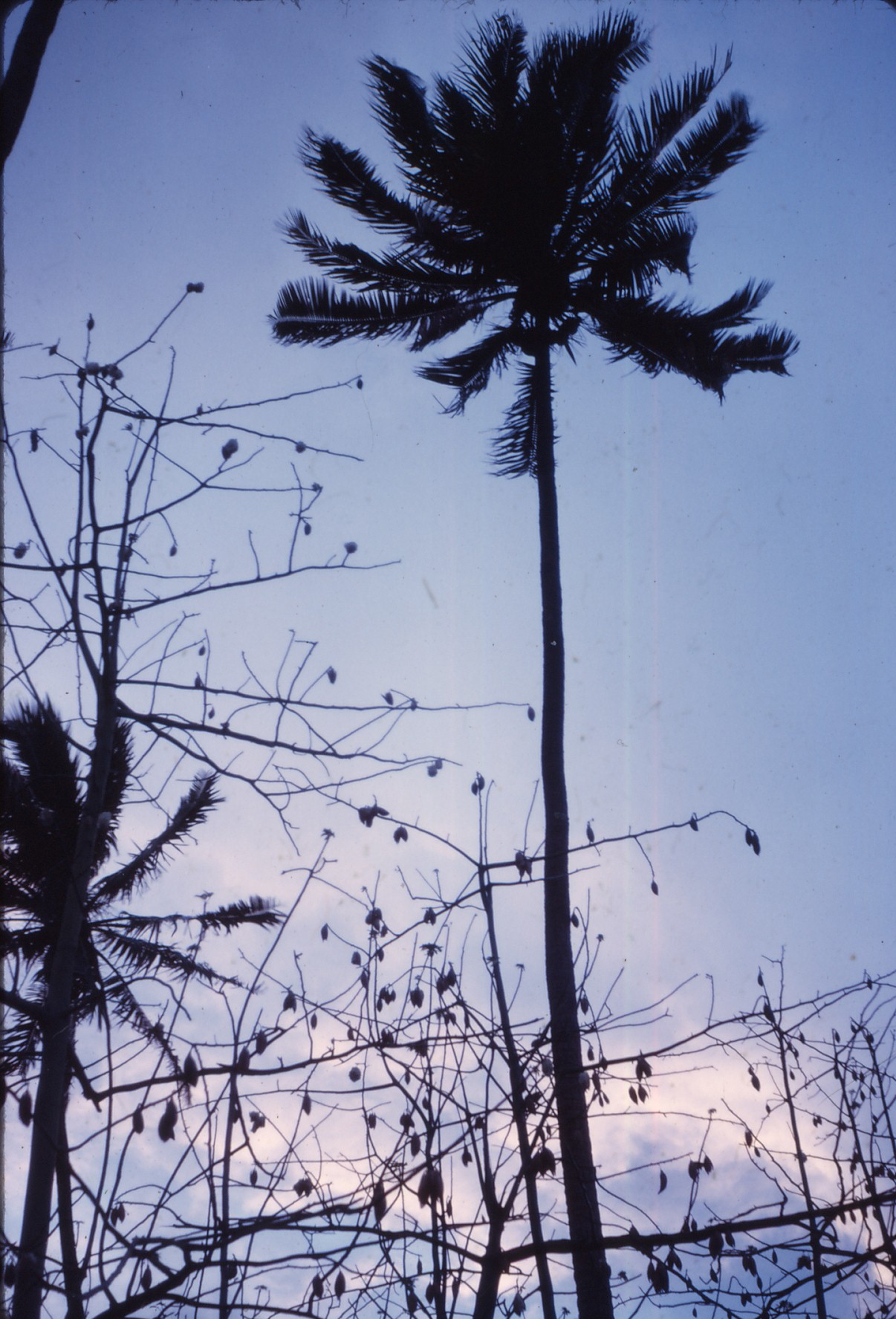
Palm tree on Tahaa

Vanilla is grown on small patches of land both as a single crop as well as an inter crop. As it needs a lot of water for growth, it is largely grown on the rainier windward side of the island. Initially, vanilla is planted next to small trees until its vines grow to some height, at which point it is cut down closer to the soil so that it spreads across the ground. It starts to flower when about three years old; the flowering period is from July to August. The government of French Polynesia sets the mandate for the final humidity level of the vanilla beans which is currently 55 percent. This distinguishes vanilla from Tahiti from all other vanillas worldwide.

Production, initially for export, reached a high of 200 tons in 1939. But it decreased to about 125 tons (metric) due to the onset of World War II in 1945. Exports gradually increased after the war to 300 tons by 1949 but then started to decline with about four tons of export in 1985 as it became ineffective to produce vanilla due to international competition, the costs of transportation of processed vanilla, exchange rates, state protectionism, plant pathology, varying global economics, and availability of cheaper varieties, which all affected the economics of vanilla production in the area.

The Centre d’Experimentation du Pacifique (CEP) was established with the goal of reviving the economy. It was launched in 1962 to overcome the drawbacks faced by the economy at large, with vanilla production being the economy's cornerstone at the time. In an effort to spark innovation and new growing techniques, emphasis was shifted to "shade house cultivation", with less-intensive labour required (due to the controlled indoor climate), and reduction in chemicals necessary for outdoor farming. Controlled growth resulted in an export record of 12 tons in 2010. In the present day, the production is largely locally utilized in view of Tahitian vanilla becoming a "status symbol of cultural identity and pride in Polynesia." Promotional actions instituted by the government to act upon this pride and boost vanilla production are many; even a dessert served by an airline in the on-board meal is infused with Tahitian vanilla.

As of 2013, vanilla production (FAO records for 2013) in French Polynesia (specifically Tahiti) accounted to only about 0.07% of the total world production; it was 60 tons from an area of 7 hectares (17 acres) with a yield of 13 hectograms per ha, comparative to the 3,500 tons yielded by plantations in Madagascar, and 3,400 tons yielded in Indonesia.

Some plantations are open to tourists; Maison de la Vanille for instance, near Haamene, permits visitors to view the vanilla preparation and drying. The island of Tahaa offers a tour, conducted by a private outfit, that takes visitors to one of the older and more voluminous plantations, situated on Hurepiti Bay.
