= Faraoa 'ipo =

Ball bread from Tuamotu, French Polynesia

Faraoa ʻipo
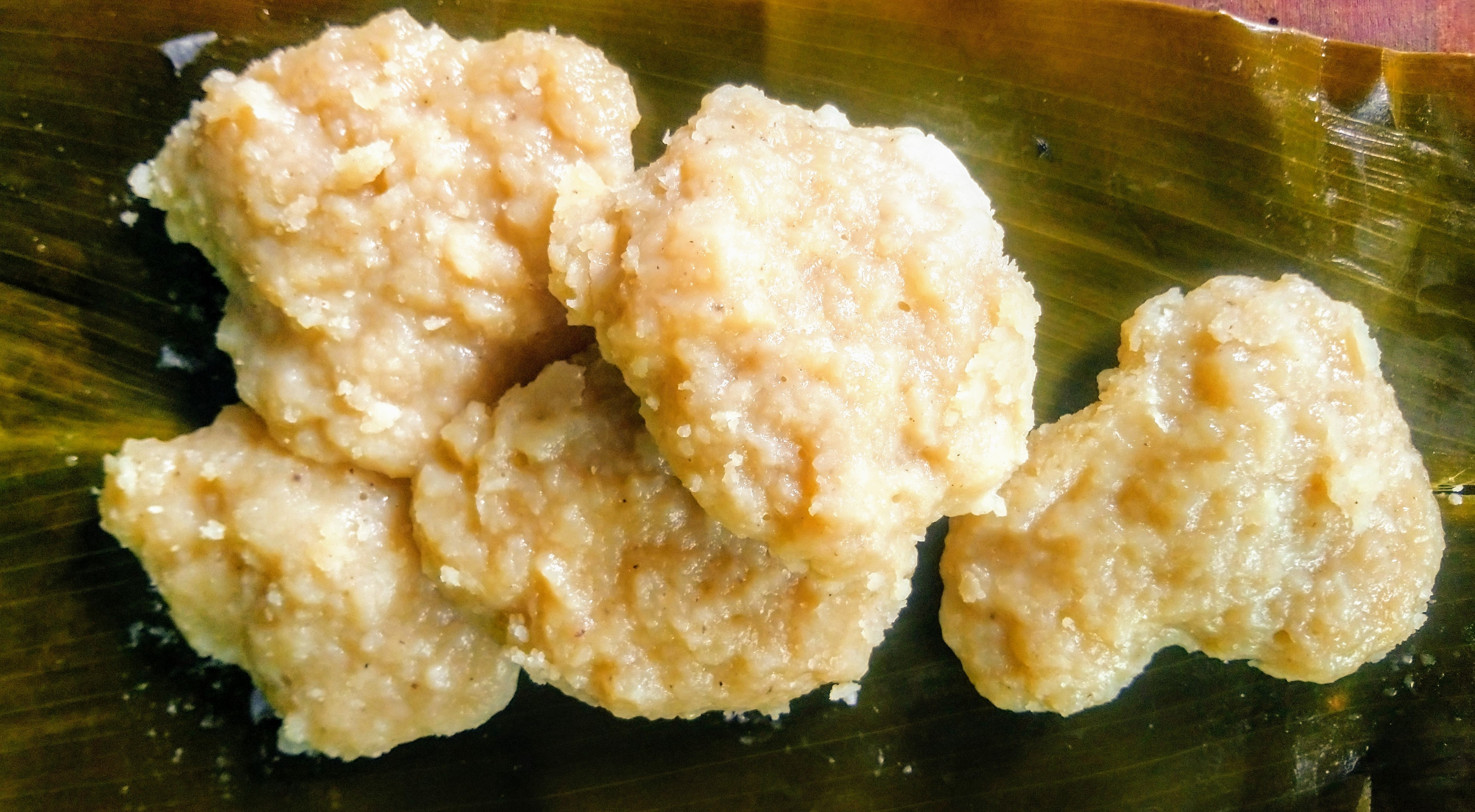
- Faraoa ʻipo
- Type: Bread
- Place of origin: French Polynesia
- Region or state: Tuamotu
- Serving temperature: Hot or room temperature
- Main ingredients: Flour, coconut milk, baker's yeast, coconut water

Faraoa ʻipo is a type of ball bread made in the Tuamotu archipelago of French Polynesia. The bread is made from flour leavened with yeast, with coconut, coconut milk, sugar and salt added. The dough is then shaped into a ball and cooked in coconut water.

It can also be cooked in a ahima'a (earth oven), wrapped in banana leaves.

== Variants ==
Faraoa means bread in the local language, coming from farine (flour). There are many varieties of bread in Polynesia, mainly made from coconut:

- Faraoa uto, bread made with flour mixed with crushed uto (coconut germ).
- Faraoa omoto bread made with flour mixed with coconut ('omoto)
- Faraoa 'eu, type of sweet bread
- Faraoa farai pani, pancake
- Faraoa ha'ari, bread with coconut milk
- Faraoa hopue, bread
- Faraoa mamahu, sweet bread cooked in banana leaves
- Faraoa mape, balls of flour mixed with coconut water and baked
