= Telephone numbers in French Polynesia =

Country Code: +689
International Call Prefix: 00

French Polynesia has used a closed eight-digit plan since 2014. The numbering plan as of February 2019 is as follows. VITI, a new mobile operator, were expected to enter the market during 2019.

International dialing format: +689 XX XX XX XX

== Fixed ==
LIST OF ALLOCATIONS
| Number range | Usage of number | Allocation |
|---|---|---|
| 40 XX XX XX | Geographical | OPT (Office des postes et telecommunications) |
| 49 XX XX XX | Non-Geographical | OPT |

Note: Payphones use 40 88 XX XX

== Mobile ==
LIST OF ALLOCATIONS
| Number range | Usage of number | Allocation |
|---|---|---|
| 87 XX XX XX | Prepaid/Postpaid | VINI |
| 88 XX XX XX | Postpaid | VITI |
| 89 XX XX XX | Prepaid/Postpaid | Pacific Mobile Telecom |

== See also ==
- Telecommunications in French Polynesia
