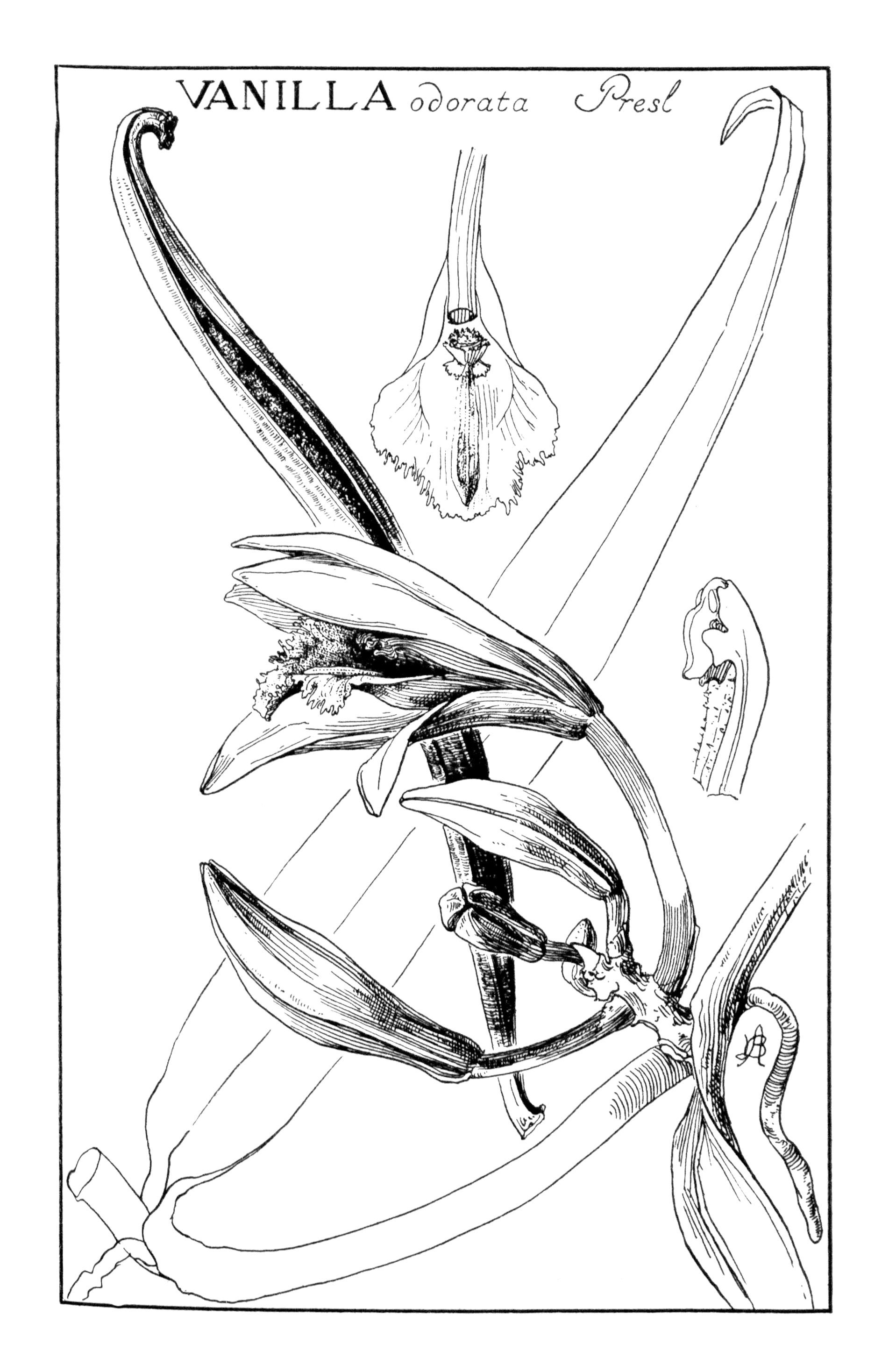
- Vanilla odorata illustrated by Blanche Ames

Conservation status
- Endangered (IUCN 3.1)

Scientific classification
- Kingdom: Plantae
- Clade: Tracheophytes
- Clade: Angiosperms
- Clade: Monocots
- Order: Asparagales
- Family: Orchidaceae
- Subfamily: Vanilloideae
- Genus: Vanilla
- Species: V. odorata

Binomial name
- Vanilla odorata C.Presl

Synonyms
- Epidendrum vermifugum Sessé & Moc.; Vanilla denticulata Pabst; Vanilla ensifolia Rolfe

= Vanilla odorata =

Species of plant in the orchid family

Vanilla odorata, also known as vanilla tlatepusco, is a species of flowering plant in the family Orchidaceae, native to southern Mexico, Central America, and tropical South America. With Vanilla planifolia it is a parent of the vanilla crop species Vanilla × tahitensis.

== Description ==
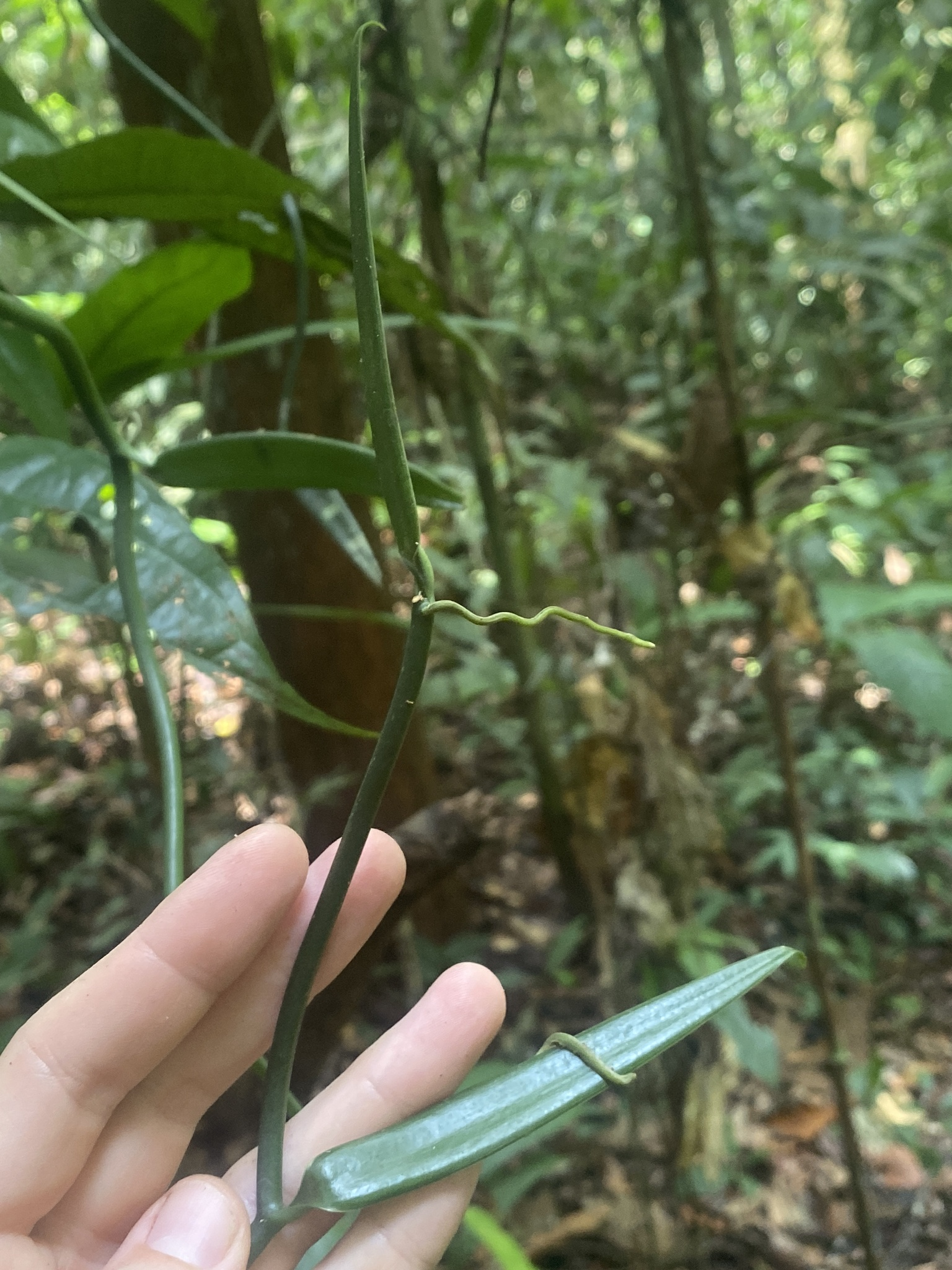
Vanilla odorata in the Allpahuayo-Mishana National Reserve, Peru

Vanilla odorata is an evergreen climbing vine. The leaves are spaced at 10–12-centimeter (3.9–4.7 in) intervals on the vines. The petiole is comparatively long at 1.5 centimeters. The leaf length is 12.5 to 20 cm (4.9 to 7.9 in) with a width of 1 to 2.5 centimeters. The leaf shape is narrowly lanceolate, elongated at the front, rounded at the base. The leaf tip is curved. The texture of the leaves is leathery to fleshy. The narrow, long leaves are a characteristic identifying feature of Vanilla odorata, though with plants growing in shade produce somewhat broader leaves.

The short racemose inflorescence (flowering stem), measures 3–4 cm (1.2–1.6 in) in length, and bears up to twelve yellowish-green flowers. The elongated bracts with pointed ends reach 1 centimeter in length. The sepals are linear to lanceolate, 4.5 to 5 centimeters long and 0.2 to 0.6 centimeters wide, though they will sometimes reach 1.1 centimeters in width.

The petals are similarly shaped, with a slightly prominent midrib. The lip grows 3.5 to 4.5 centimeters long. It is three-lobed, with the lateral lobes turned up tubularly and fused to the column up to half of the lip length. The anterior free part of the lip is spread, wavy and fringed at the edge. There is a scaled area in the middle of the lip. The column is club-shaped and not curved. The curved fruit grows 15 to 20 centimeters long and about 0.5 centimeters thick; and is very fragrant.

== Distribution ==
Vanilla odorata is distributed from Mexico south throughout Central America and the northern half of South America. Some collections may be escaped cultivated specimens, as the fruits have been used for culinary use similarly to Vanilla planifolia, the most widely cultivated vanilla.

== Taxonomy and history ==
This orchid was first described by Carl Borivoj Presl in 1826. Presl mentions that the fruits collected 36 years earlier were still fragrant when he examined them. The original scientific description was only from the fruits, according to Oakes Ames, and that a more detailed description of the plant and leaves was only written in 1895 by R. Allen Rolfe in his monograph on the genus Vanilla. Ames also reported that his publication was the first scientific description of the flower of Vanilla odorata.

Within the genus Vanilla, Vanilla odorata is placed in the subgenus Xanata and in the section Xanata, which contains only species of the Neotropics. Synonyms of Vanilla odorata include Vanilla denticulata, Vanilla ensifolia, and Vanilla uncinata. Soto Arenas and Cribb place it in the Vanilla planifolia group. Vanilla fimbriata, which is insufficiently known, is particularly similar. Vanilla odorata is considered a parent of Tahitian vanilla (Vanilla × tahitensis), from a study of its DNA.

=== Names ===
The genus name, Vanilla, derives from Spanish vainilla meaning little pod or capsule as a reference to the long, podlike fruits. The species name refers to the very aromatic scent of the plant's fruits. The common name is vanilla tlatepusco.

== Ecology ==
Along with Vanilla planifolia, Vanilla odorata is one of the few species of plant that has its seeds distributed by bees. Males bees from tribe Euglossini including Euglossa bursigera, Euglossa ignita, Euglossa tridentata, and Eulaema cingulata exhibit scent collecting behaviors on the ripe pods and in the process will pick up some of the seeds. Similarly female sweat bees of the species Trigona fulviventris have been observed removing the sticky pulp of the pods in a behavior consistent with gathering nest building materials and taking away seeds in the process. For an orchid, V. odorata has relatively large seeds and it is likely that it is dependent on distribution by bees or other animals. Distribution of seeds by other animals is not confirmed in V. odorata, but a study led by D. Adam Karremans found that V. planifolia and Vanilla pompona fruits that fall to the forest floor are consumed and viable seeds are passed by mammals including Tome's spiny rat and the common opossum.

=== Conservation ===
The IUCN has listed Vanilla odorata as "endangered" in their 2017 Red List of Threatened Species due to restricted range and not being abundant within its habitat. "The habitat quality and quantity are being continuously reduced by land use change, especially for agriculture."
